= William Lamb alias Paniter =

Scottish author (c. 1493–1550)

William Lamb, or William Paniter alias Lamb, (c. 1493 - 1550) was a Scottish cleric, lawyer, and author.

== Life ==
William Lamb was the son of a sister of Patrick Paniter, and a cousin of David Panter. In his early career he adopted his uncle Patrick Paniter's name. His clerical appointments included the Prebendaries of Conveth and Croy, rectory of Kinnell, and canon of Moray. He was enrolled as Master of Arts at St Andrews University in 1520.

On 25 February 1537, James V of Scotland ordered the Court of Session to admit William to sit in daily at their proceedings to learn their legal practices. He became a Senator of the College of Justice.

== Ane Resonyng ==
William Lamb wrote Ane Resonyng of ane Scottis and Inglis merchand betuix Rowand and Lionis in 1549. It was an answer to English propaganda published during the war of the Rough Wooing. Unlike the Complaynt of Scotland (Paris, 1549), Lamb's book was not published but survived in manuscript.

The arguments are set out as a dialogue between a Scot and an Englishmen who meet while travelling in France, with an appearance from Thomas More, John Fisher and Richard Reynolds of Sion, three English Catholic martyrs.
