= Robert Reid (bishop) =

Scottish bishop

Robert Reid O. Cist.
- Bishop of Orkney
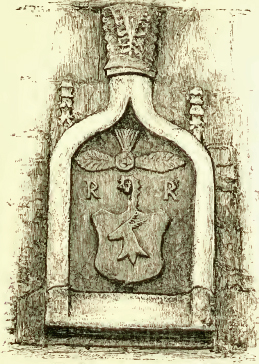
- Coat of Arms of Robert Reid
- Church: Roman Catholic Church
- Metropolis: St Andrews
- Diocese: Orkney
- In office: 1541-1558
- Predecessor: Robert Maxwell
- Successor: Adam Bothwell

Orders
- Ordination: c. 1519 (priest)
- Consecration: 1529 (abbatial blessing); 1541 (bishop)

Personal details
- Born: c. 1496 – c. 1499
- Died: 6 September 1558 Dieppe, Normandy, France
- Buried: Church of St Jacques, Dieppe in the Chapel of St Andrew
- Parents: John Reid and Elizabeth (Bessata) Schanwell
- Education: Master of Arts (1511 – 1515); Post graduate, prob. France (1515 – 1518)
- Alma mater: St Salvator's College, St Andrews University
- Motto: Moderate

Robert Reid (died 1558) was Abbot of Kinloss, Commendator-prior of Beauly, and Bishop of Orkney. He was born at Aikenhead in Clackmannan parish, the son of John Reid (killed at the Battle of Flodden) and Elizabeth Schanwell. His formal education began in 1511 at St Salvator's College in St Andrews University under the supervision of his uncle, Robert Schanwell, dean of the faculty of arts. Reid graduated in 1515 and by 1524 was subdean at Elgin Cathedral, where, by 1527, he was Official (Note: The pre-Reformation official of a diocese was a canon who was also a qualified lawyer trained in canon law and very often in civil law also. He was the judge of the bishop's consistorial court, and there was generally no appeal to the bishop over his judgments. These courts dealt with questions relating to divorce, legitimacy, illegitimacy and dowry—also, problems arising from intestacy, the interpretation of wills and their authenticity. At times, the court would hear cases relating to contracts made under oath. Hearings might also involve patronage, non-payment of tithes or dues, interference with church property, assaults on clerics and brawling in holy areas.) of Moray. Thomas Chrystall, the abbot of Kinloss, chose Reid as his successor in 1526. In 1527, as abbot-designate, he attended the court of Pope Clement VII on business related to his abbacy. While returning via Paris in 1528, Reid met the Piedmontese humanist scholar Giovanni Ferrerio who accompanied him back to Scotland. Following Chrystall's resignation in July 1528, Reid was blessed as abbot in September and received the Priory of Beauly, in commendam, in 1531. In that same year, Ferrerio left the court of James V to join Reid at Kinloss as tutor to the monks of both Kinloss and Beauly. Reid held many offices of state between 1532 and 1542, including ambassadorial roles to England and France, as well as senior law offices. He considerably improved the external and internal fabric of both monasteries in 1538.

In the spring of 1541, James V nominated Reid to the vacant bishopric of Orkney, with his consecration taking place in late November. King James died in 1542, and James Hamilton, Earl of Arran was appointed regent during Queen Mary's minority. Bishop Reid aligned himself with Cardinal Beaton in his dislike of the pro-English stance of Arran. Beaton's resistance to the regent's viewpoint led to his arrest, and the cardinal's supporters chose Reid to negotiate with Arran for Beaton's release in 1543. Reid's attempts were rejected but the cardinal's freedom was gradually restored. Despite his support of Beaton, Reid was elected to the influential Lords of the Articles committee of parliament. This position also brought with it membership of the regent's privy council. Parliament approved the Treaty of Greenwich, concluded in July 1543, which paved the way for a betrothal between Queen Mary and Prince Edward of England. On 11 December, a renunciation of the treaty was passed by parliament and resulted in the English King Edward's declaration of war on Scotland that lasted nearly eight years and came to be known as the Rough Wooing.

In August 1544, Bishop Reid travelled to Kirkwall's St Magnus Cathedral, the seat of his Orkney bishopric. He immediately began structural improvements to the diocesan buildings and reforms to the cathedral chapter. Reid became president of the College of Justice in February 1549. He relinquished his abbacy of Kinloss to his nephew Walter Reid in 1550 and that same year sat at the heresy trial of Adam Wallace. His services continued to be in demand, and in June 1551, he was appointed as commissioner to treat for peace with England. In May 1554, Reid was a curator to the young Queen Mary. Shortly before embarking for France to attend the Queen's wedding to the Dauphin in 1558, Reid made out his last will and testament that allowed for a college to be established in Edinburgh that was to consist of grammar, arts and law schools with all necessary accommodation. Reid's ship was wrecked near Boulogne, but both he and his fellow commissioner, the Earl of Rothes, survived to witness the royal marriage at Nôtre-Dame Cathedral. Upon reaching Dieppe on his journey home, Reid and fellow commissioners fell ill, and on 6 September 1558, he died and was buried in Dieppe's Church of St Jacques.

== Early life ==
Robert Reid's date of birth is unrecorded, but he began his university education in 1511. Like most students of the time, entry usually occurred between the ages of twelve and fifteen, which would have placed his probable year of birth between 1496 and 1499. Robert's parents, John Reid and Elizabeth (sometimes known as Bessata) Schanwell, had six children of whom Robert was the third born—his two older brothers were David and James, and his three younger sisters were Christian, Helen and Margaret.

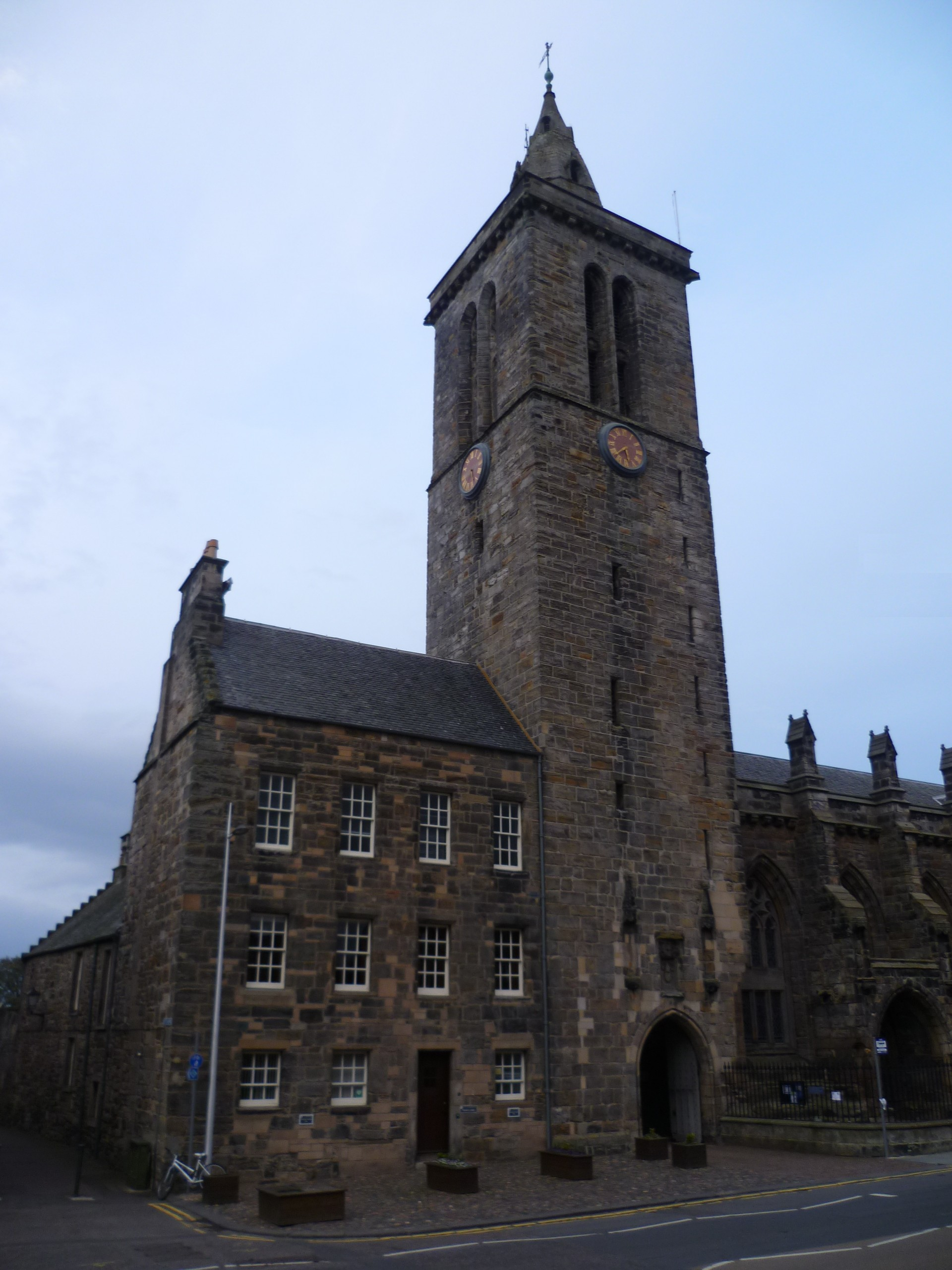
St Salvator's Tower, University of St Andrews

Elizabeth Schanwell had at least three siblings—John who became abbot of Couper Angus, William who was a secular cleric, and Robert who in 1501 was Vicar of Kircaldy, and Dean of the faculty of arts at St Andrews University from 1512 to 1517. From 1517 to 1519, Robert Schanwell served as Deputy Rector and Rector of the university. Reid entered St Salvator's College in St Andrews University in 1511 during the period that his uncle, Robert Schanwell, held high office. Under the tutelage of Hugh Spens, Professor of Sacred Theology, he graduated as a Bachelor of Arts in 1513 or 1514, followed by his Master of Arts on 28 May 1515. St Salvador's College introduced the study of canon law as part of the curriculum in 1500, when it required that a Bachelor of Canon Law deliver three lectures per week. Hugh Spens had become a Doctor of Canon Law in 1508, but it was not until 1538 that degrees in civil law were offered. By the 1430s, for those aspiring to the higher echelons of the church or service to the king, or both, a postgraduate degree in canon or civil law was essential. Reid is almost always described as being a postgraduate law student at the University of Paris, but no record of this has been uncovered. Moreover, Reid's future distinguished law career with expertise in both canon and civil law would rule out Paris as it was specifically barred from offering civil law. Instead, other universities provided this discipline; for instance, the University of Orléans, situated only 110 km southwest of Paris, offered a three-year course on civil law for those qualified in canon law.

Reid was appointed as a Notary public in the diocese of Moray in 1518 and then described as a court procurator in Fife and as a cleric of St Andrews diocese, both in 1519. In 1520, he acted as a notary public of St Andrews diocese. He was subdean in the Diocese of Moray at Elgin Cathedral by 1524 and then officialis or official of the diocese by 1527—the official of a diocese was a lawyer who was the judge in the bishop's consistorial court and needed not only in-depth knowledge of canon law but frequently, civil law also.

== Abbot of Kinloss ==
Pope Clement VII to Robert Reid, 4 July 1528

Clement etc. to his dear son Robert Reid, Abbot of the Monastery of Kinloss, of the Cistercian Order, in the Diocese of Moray, greetings etc

...For some time now We have reserved all of the appointments of all of the churches and monasteries, vacant then and vacant before, in the aforesaid See [Moray], to our decision and disposition, and We declare that it is invalid and idle for anyone, relying on any authority whatsoever, knowingly or ignorantly, to call this in question...

...We appoint you abbot, and commit you to the cure, rule and administration of that same monastery, with full powers over its spiritual and temporal affairs.

Given at Viterbo, 4 July 1528, in the fifth year of Our pontificate.

The abbey of Kinloss, founded by King David I in 1151, is situated only a few miles from Elgin Cathedral where Robert Reid was its subdean and official, was governed by Abbot Thomas Crystall since his appointment on 13 January 1500. Chrystall had been very successful in retrieving misappropriated property belonging to the abbey and reinstating teinds that had been neglected and by doing so doubled the abbey income. Crystall performed numerous charitable acts in the distribution of alms and even provided impoverished ladies with money as dowries to enable suitable marriages. The upkeep of his abbey properties was important to him, carrying out repairs and new building work at Kinloss while also improving the church furnishings and library. The external properties in Ellon and Strathisla were also well maintained. The additional income that Chrystall achieved allowed him to increase the number of monks from fourteen to twenty or more. Crystall was fully committed to the abbacy, refusing offers of elevation to the larger abbacies of Melrose and Dryburgh and then to the bishopric of Ross. Reid's abilities were drawn upon by the Pope when he was chosen to resolve an internal church dispute between the Abbot of Cambuskenneth and the Vicar of Stirling in 1526. With the abbey's proximity to the cathedral, Chrystall was ideally placed to observe Reid at first-hand, and so it was that it was the cathedral's subdean that he chose as his successor in 1526.

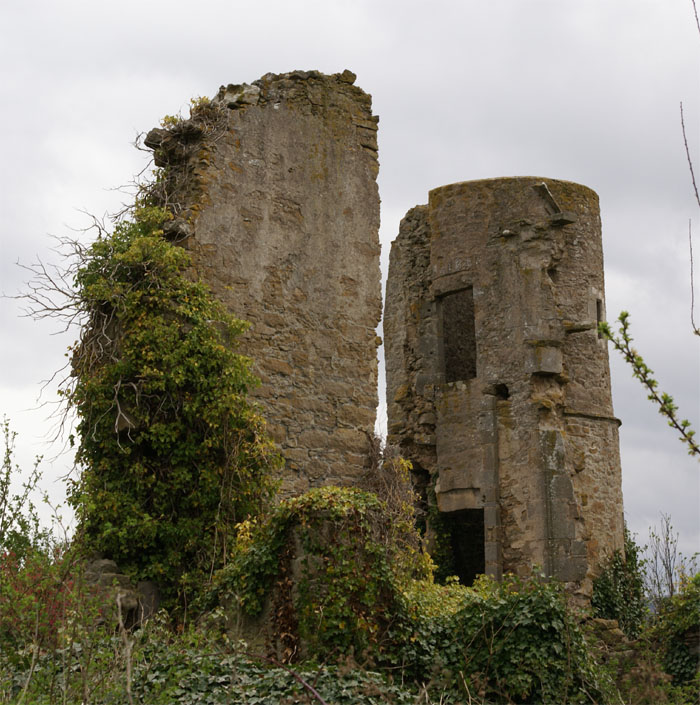
Abbot Reid's house, Kinloss Abbey

Rome was sacked on 6 May 1527 by the forces of Charles V, the Holy Roman Emperor, resulting in Pope Clement VII's imprisonment in the Castel Sant'Angelo. His release was finally negotiated, and on 6 December 1527, he left Rome for the Umbrian city of Orvieto, 120 km to the North. Abbot-elect Reid faced a winter journey to meet the Pope, probably in the furtherance of his position at Kinloss, and left Elgin, ostensibly for Rome, sometime after 10 November 1527, but it may have been in Orvieto that he met the Pontiff. Reid's return journey took him via Paris, where he was introduced to the humanist scholar Giovanni Ferrerio by the Scottish scholar and Augustinian canon, Robert Richardson. Following his studies at Turin, the Piedmontese Ferrerio arrived in Paris in 1525, where he became a companion of not only Richardson but also other Scottish scholars such as Hector Boece, George Buchanan and William Gordon. Ferrerio accompanied Reid back to Scotland to the court of King James V, where he would spend the next three years. In Pope Clement VII's bull of 4 July 1528, he acknowledged having received Chrystall's request to resign, which he granted. he declared that the appointment of a successor to any monastery within the see of Moray lay solely with him and that he had therefore appointed Reid, Abbot of Kinloss. This was conditional on Reid accepting the Cistercian monk's habit within six months of taking up the rule of the abbey; he received the habit and blessing from the bishop of Aberdeen at a ceremony at the church of the Grey Friars in Edinburgh in the autumn of 1528. Crystal retired to the tower house that he had built in 1525, at Strathisla in the abbey estates, having retained the fruits of the abbey. Crystall lived on for a further six years before he died at Strathisla on 29 December 1535 and was buried the next day at Kinloss.

One of Reid's first acts as abbot was to prosecute the nearby burgh of Forres to retrieve lands at Burgie and convert all of the abbey estates into a barony. The Barony of Muirton was created out of much of the abbey lands just north of the buildings. In 1531, Ferrerio was allowed to leave James's court to teach some of the Kinloss monks and, as a result of Reid having received, in commendam, the Priory of Beauly on 1 November, (Note: According to the Records of Kinloss, Reid was in possession of the priory in 1530.) he also tutored five of the Beauly monks, seconded to Kinloss for a period of three years. Abbot Reid energetically set about renovations to the abbot's rooms, building arches in the cloister, providing the abbey with a fire-proof library, and having three chapels provided with altarpieces and adorned with murals; externally, he had the roof of the abbey sealed with a lead covering, provided new barns, a malthouse with an associated kiln and a dovecot.

== Bishop of Orkney ==
Pope Paul III to Robert Reid, 20 July 1541

Paul etc. to his dear son Robert Reid, Elect of Orkney, greetings.

...For some time now We have reserved to Our ordination and disposition the appointments of all of the churches vacant, declaring that henceforth it is invalid and idle for anyone, relying on any authority, knowingly or ignorantly, to call this in question...

...We appoint you and prefer you to the office of bishop to the pastorate, cure, and administration of that church, and commit to you full powers in both spiritual and temporal matters.

Given at Rome, at Santa Maria [Maggiore], 16th October,1541, in the seventh year [of Our pontificate.]

Robert Maxwell, Bishop of Orkney, had died by 25 December 1540, and Robert Reid was nominated by the King for the bishopric on 5 April 1541. The provision was granted on 20 July 1541, with Reid retaining his existing benefices, including the abbacy of Kinloss. Like many other clerics, Reid, the politician, was more in evidence than Reid, the theologian. However, in 1544, once again back in his diocese, Reid revised the diocese's constitution. This stipulated that there would be seven dignitaries led by a provost, seven canons, thirteen chaplains, and six choristers—the chancellor was charged with delivering a weekly lecture on canon law, and one of the chaplains was detailed to head up the grammar school.

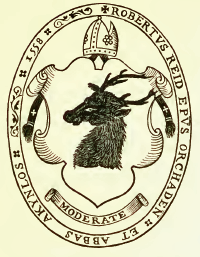
Book-stamp of Robert Reid

Unusually, the Royal Burgh of Kirkwall owned St. Magnus Cathedral, given to it in a royal charter by James III in 1486. This charter stipulated that the income from the prebend of St John was to be used for the upkeep of the cathedral building and its contents, but Reid disregarded this; other appropriations to finance this overhaul of the chapter were enforced. This channelled away revenues from parishes and risked the downgrading of the quality of pastoral care.

In 1541, Bishop Reid, as commendator of Beauly, had the bell tower rebuilt after it had been ruined during a storm on 1 January. The nave of the priory church was renovated and the roof was protected with the addition of oak tiles. Further building works took place in 1544 when the old and ramshackle priory buildings were demolished and completely rebuilt, incorporating many improvements. In Orkney, evidence of the bishop's industriousness can be seen by the number of buildings that have Reid's coat of arms inserted into them—the most prominent of these being the restoration of the Bishop's Palace, to which Reid had added a round tower in its northwest corner.

In 1554, Reid set about fine-tuning the diocesan organisation. To prepare for the divine services, the chaplains and the choristers were re-housed, and the subdean was allocated chambers that were better suited to his role of enforcing overall discipline when the provost was absent.

== Diplomacy and judiciary ==
The new College of Justice held its inaugural meeting on 27 May 1532 when Abbot Reid was admitted as a senator in place of his uncle, Robert Schanwell. Alexander Mylne, the Abbot of Cambuskenneth, was appointed the college's first president, and the king stipulated that Reid should act as its president upon Mylne's absence, "to minister thair in quhill hes returning." King James authorised William Stewart, Bishop of Aberdeen and Reid to negotiate a peace treaty with Henry VIII of England in February 1533; however, it was 2 August 1534 before it was finally concluded. Ferrerio later wrote that Bishop Stewart and Abbot Reid were the only men capable of getting a "peace surpassing all expectation from an angry nation" (England). Reid was engaged in diplomatic work in France concerning the marriage of King James during 1535 and 1536, firstly with Marie de Bourbon and then with the sickly Madeleine, daughter of the French king. James and Madeleine married at Nôtre-Dame Cathedral in Paris on 1 January 1537, but the new Queen died within months at Holyrood Palace.

Reid was an envoy to Henry in 1541 and again in 1542, and on the latter instance was prevented from returning to the Scottish court and from writing to it until the preparations for war with Scotland were underway. In November 1542, Henry VIII had revived the English assertion of the overlordship of Scotland. King James died on 14 December 1542, and on 3 January 1543, James Hamilton, Earl of Arran, now heir presumptive, was appointed regent for the six-day-old Queen Mary. Arran, holding pro-English views, had Beaton arrested. It was against this backdrop that, in March 1543, Reid was part of a gathering in Perth of like-minded nobles and churchmen who supported Beaton. It was agreed to send the bishop to meet Arran to call for the cardinal's release and for the cessation of the circulation of English-language versions of the New Testament, all of which were turned down.

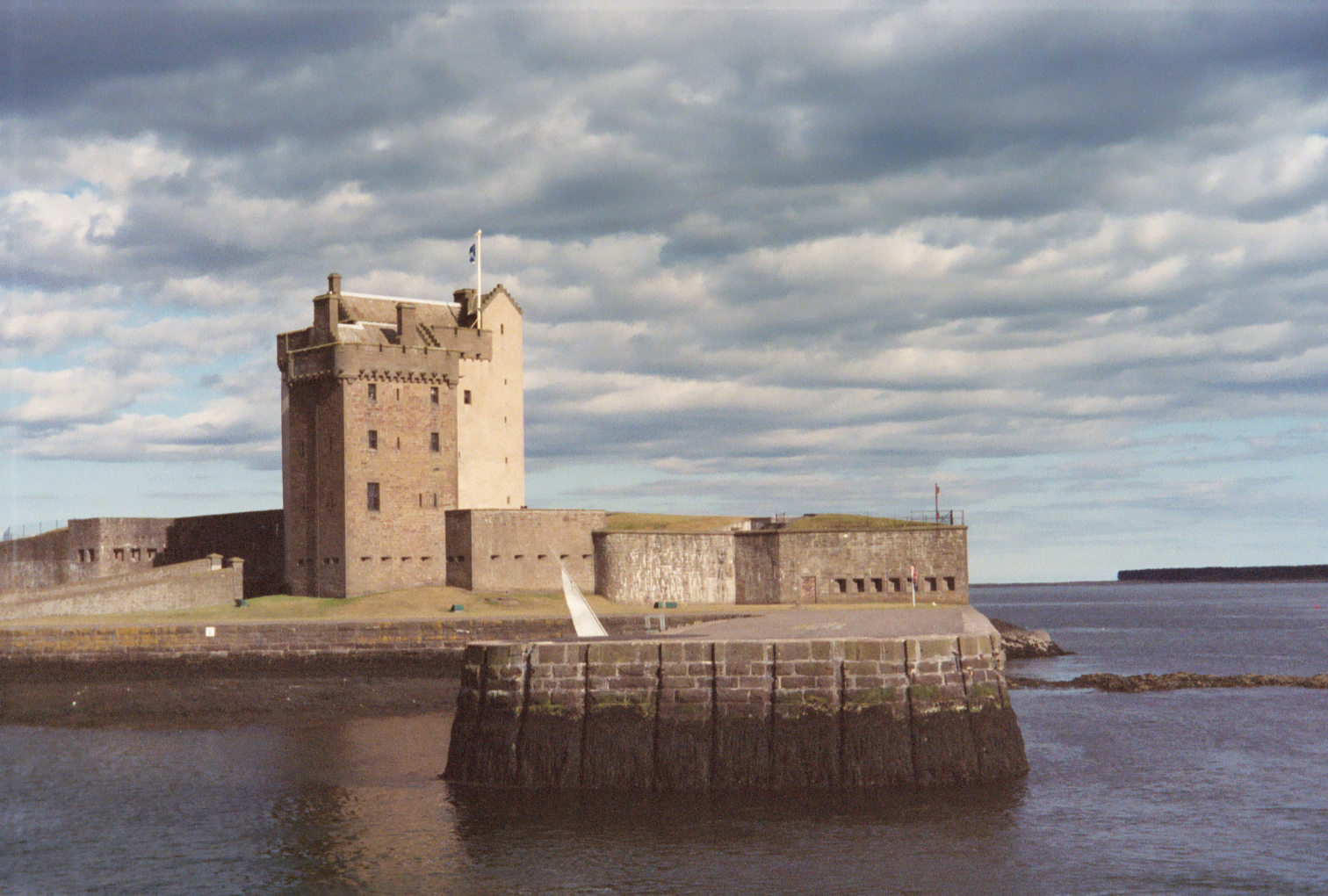
Broughty Craig Castle

Arran called for a sitting of parliament in Edinburgh where despite his opposition to the regent's policies, Reid was appointed to the important Committee of the Articles. Reid continued to represent Beaton in his dealings with Arran who, with parliament, affirmed the treaties of Greenwich by which Queen Mary would, when she reached the age of ten, marry Prince Edward of England. Arran immediately began to vacillate and came to an agreement with the cardinal, went back on the Greenwich treaties, and repudiated his reforming principles. The pro-English lords led by the earls of Lennox and Angus met with Reid on 13 January 1544 and agreed to Beaton's terms, allowing for a meeting with Regent Arran. The next day, on 17 January, the bishop was again meeting with Angus to finalise all remaining matters that existed between the earl and Arran.

Cardinal David Beaton was assassinated in his castle of St Andrews on 28 May 1546. In response, Arran formed a small inner circle of four politicians to be readily available to him—Reid served on this council in June and July 1546 and then again in March 1547. He was also tasked with securing a doctor for Queen Mary and, it is thought, provided religious education to the monarch. Following the death of Abbot Alexander Mylne in 1548, Reid was appointed the president of the College of Justice, appearing for the first time on 24 February 1549. The strategic Broughty Castle at the mouth of the River Tay had been in English hands since September 1547, but in February 1550 it had been retaken by a Joint French and Scottish force. The military successes in 1549 and 1550 prompted Reid, in his role as president of the College of Justice, to ensure that foreigners (i.e. the English) did not take their money with them but should spend it on Scottish goods. In the years 1550 to 1552, Reid was engaged in many legal and monetary matters but diplomatic duties were called on in 1552 when he was appointed one of the commissioners to negotiate a treaty with the young King Edward to end hostilities, define the border, the return of hostages and prisoners, and the exchange of criminals, among other things. On 12 April 1554, when the dowager queen, Mary of Guise, became regent for her daughter, Reid, as Queen Mary's curator, presented the necessary documents to parliament for endorsement. Again, Reid's ambassadorial experience was needed when, on 11 June 1557, he was one of the Scottish commissioners in Carlisle to treat for peace with England. France and Spain were now at war and with Mary, Queen of England and wife of Philip of Spain, France feared an alliance of England and Spain on the battlefield—dowager Queen Mary of Guise and regent, was now pushing for Scotland to enter the war on the side of France. The Scottish nobles resisted this, but after an overwhelming French defeat by Spain at St Quentin, in Picardy on 10 August 1557, the marriage between Mary, Queen of Scots and the Dauphin now took on greater urgency.

== Death ==
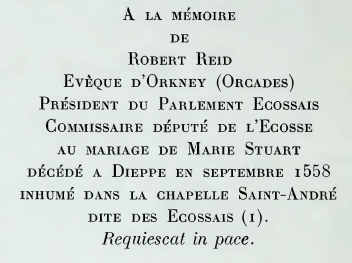
Memorial to Robert Reid in Church of St Jacques, Dieppe

In a letter dated 30 October 1557, Henry of France requested that the Scottish parliament send commissioners to prepare for the wedding of Queen Mary to the Dauphin of France. Robert Reid was appointed as one of the nine commissioners to negotiate the wedding treaty. (Note: On 14 December 1557, the commissioners chosen by parliament to negotiate the wedding treaty were: James Beaton, Archbishop of Glasgow Robert Reid, Bishop of Orkney (died, 6 September 1558) David Panter, Bishop of Ross—Panter did not attend due to ill-health George Leslie, Earl of Rothes (died, abt. 8 September 1558) Gilbert Kennedy, Earl of Cassillis (died, 14 September 1558) Lord James Fleming (died, 18 December 1558) Lord George Seaton James Stewart, (commendator) Prior of St Andrews—natural brother of the queen John Erskin of Dun) On 6 February 1558—the day that he embarked for France—Reid concluded his last will and testament that allowed for a sum of 8000 merks to be used for the formation of a college in Edinburgh. (Note: Bishop Reid's last will and testament stipulated that the college should consist of three schools: a grammar school, an arts school and a law school and should include chambers for the tutors.) (Note: The curriculum in the schools was to avoid the existing norms of the universities, with civil law to take precedence over canon law and the arts course to be more literature, poetry and oratory-based.) Reid embarked on one of the ships of a small flotilla that had been assembled to transport the commissioners, personages with their horses and gifts for the wedding. The weather was poor, and even before they had left Scottish waters, one of the ships transporting the horses foundered and sank—another ship, whose master was a certain Captain Watterton, was wrecked as it approached the French coast with the loss of many gentlemen and valuable cargo. Reid and his fellow commissioner, the Earl of Rothes, were themselves shipwrecked near Boulogne and were rescued by a French fishing boat. On 11 April, Bishop Reid and his fellow commissioners agreed on the marriage contract that protected Scotland's rights—this contract prevailed despite an attempt by the French to subvert the outcome by obtaining an agreement directly with Queen Mary to Scotland's detriment. Mary's wedding took place on 24 April at Notre Dame Cathedral—the scene of her father's wedding to Madeline twenty-one years earlier. An altercation took place between the Council of France and the Scottish commissioners when the French demanded that the Regalia of Scotland be immediately sent to France so that the Dauphin could be crowned King of Scotland. Reid and his fellow commissioners refused such terms by explaining that they had no mandate from the Scottish parliament to agree to them. Displeased with this response, the French king prepared a letter of persuasion to the regent that two of the commissioners would deliver. In the meantime, the other commissioners were kept back until the French were certain that the letter was successfully delivered—only at this point could Reid return to Scotland. Reid arrived at Dieppe at the end of August and started for home, only to be driven back in a gale, but by this time the bishop and four other commissioners were very ill. They all died, but Reid was the first, on 6 September 1558, and was buried in the Chapel of St Andrew in the Church of St Jacques, in Dieppe.

== Sources ==
- Boyle, L.E. (1984). Aston, D. H. (ed.). The History of the University of Oxford. Oxford: Oxford University Press. pp. 536–7. ISBN 0-19-951011-3.
- Brown, P. Hume (1912), History of Scotland, Cambridge: Cambridge University Press Ltd
- Brunton, George; Haig, David (1836). An Historical Account of the Senators of the College of Justice from its Institution in MDXXXII. Edinburgh: J. Smith & Son, Glasgow; Brown & Co. Aberdeen; and Smith, Elder, & Co. London.
- Clouston, J. Storer, ed. (1914), Records of the Earldom of Orkney, Edinburgh: Scottish History Society
- Cowan, Ian B.; Easson, David E., eds. (1976). Medieval Religious Houses Scotland (Second ed.). London: Longman Group Limited. ISBN 0-582-12069-1.
- Cuthbert, Olaf D. (1998), A Flame in the Shadows (Robert Reid, Bishop of Orkney, 1541-1558), The Orkney Press Ltd, ISBN 978-0907618485
- Dilworth, Mark (2004). "Chrystall, Thomas (1468 – 1535)". Oxford Dictionary of National Biography (online ed.). Oxford University Press. doi:10.1093/ref:odnb/6856. (Subscription, Wikipedia Library access or UK public library membership required.)
- Dunlop, Annie I., ed. (1964), ACTA FACULTATIS ARTIUM, UNIVERSITATIS SANCTIANDREE, 1413-1588, vol. I, Edinburgh: Scottish History Society
- Dunlop, Annie I., ed. (1964), ACTA FACULTATIS ARTIUM, UNIVERSITATIS SANCTIANDREE, 1413-1588, vol. II, Edinburgh: Scottish History Society
- Finlay, J (2009), "The History of the Notary in Scotland", in Schmoeckel, J; Schuber, W (eds.), Handbuch zur Geschichte des Notariats der europäischen Traditionen, Baden-Baen: Nomos Verlagsgesellschaft mbH & Company KG, ISBN 978-3-8329-4068-3
- Graves, Michael A.R. (2003). Henry VIII: A Study in Kingship. London: Pearson Education Ltd. ISBN 0-582-38110-X.
- Henderson, Thomas Finlayson (1896), "Reid, Robert (d 1558)", Reid, Robert (d. 1558), Dictionary of National Biography (online ed.), doi:10.1093/odnb/9780192683120.013.23338
- Holmes, Stephen Mark (2008), "The Meaning of History: A Dedicatory Letter from Giovanni Ferrerio to Abbot Robert Reid in his 'Historia abbatum de Kynloss'", Reformation & Renaissance Review, 10 (1): 89–115, doi:10.1558/rrr.v10i1.89
- Keiller, Ian (1975), "Bishop Reid of Orkney-Founder of Edinburgh University" (PDF), Scottish Society for Northern Studies, 6: 39–42
- Kirk, James (2004). "Reid, Robert (d. 1558)". Oxford Dictionary of National Biography. Oxford Dictionary of National Biography. Vol. 1 (online ed.). Oxford University Press. doi:10.1093/ref:odnb/23338. (Subscription, Wikipedia Library access or UK public library membership required.)
- Legris, P. (1918), L'Église Saint-Jacques de Dieppe, Dieppe: G. Letremble, Libraire
- Lynch, Michael, ed. (2011), "Rough Wooing, Morag MacLeod", Oxford Companion to Scottish History, Oxford: Oxford University Press, ISBN 978-0-19-969305-4
- Oram, Richard, ed. (2001), "James V (1513 – 1542), Christine McGladdery", The Kings & Queens of Scotland, Stroud, Gloucestershire: Tempus Publishing Ltd, ISBN 978-0-7524-1991-6
- Shaw, Lachlan (1882). The History of the Province of Moray. Vol. III (New ed.). London: Hamilton, Adams & Co. p. 178.
- Stuart, John, ed. (1862), Records of the Monastery of Kinloss, Edinburgh: Society of Antiquaries
- Taylor, James (1859). The Pictorial History of Scotland. Vol. 1. London: James S Virtue.
- Watt, D. E. R.; Murray, A. L., eds. (2003). Fasti Ecclesiae Scoticanae Medii Ad Annum. Edinburgh: The Scottish Record Society. ISBN 0-902054-19-8.
- Watt, D. E. R.; Shead, N. F., eds. (2001). The Heads of Religious Houses in Scotland from Twelfth to Sixteenth Centuries. Edinburgh: The Scottish Record Society. ISBN 0-902054-18-X.

Catholic Church titles
Preceded by Robert Maxwell	Bishop of Orkney; 1541 – 1558	Succeeded by Adam Bothwell
Preceded by Thomas Chrystall	Abbot of Kinloss Abbey; 1528 – 1553	Succeeded by Walter Reid
Preceded by James de Baldoven	Prior of Beauly; 1531 – 1553	Succeeded by Walter Reid
Legal offices
Preceded by Alexander Myln	President of the College of Justice; 1549 – 1558	Succeeded by Henry Sinclair
