= Alexander Myln =

Scottish abbot and judge

Alexander Myln (Note: Alternatively spelled 'Milne' or 'Mylne'.) (1474 - circa 1549) was a Scottish abbot and judge.

He is thought to have come from Angus. His father, John Myln, was appointed Master Mason to the Crown of Scotland in 1481. He was educated at the University of St Andrews, from where he graduated in 1494. Shortly after finishing university Myln was ordained, and by 1505 he was a rector under the Bishop of Dunkeld and a notary. Shortly after he was made a canon and official of Dunkeld.

In 1516, Albany, the regent of Scotland, wrote to Pope Leo X recommending that Myln be appointed abbot of Cambuskenneth Abbey, and he took up the appointment in 1517. At about the same time he followed in his father's footsteps, being appointed Master Mason by James V. In 1524, Myln was sent as part of a delegation to the court of Henry VIII that was intended to negotiate a marriage between James V and Henry's daughter Mary.

In 1526, Myln was one of eight men appointed to sit with the members of the King's Council on the Session, a central civil court constituted as part of the council. In 1531 Myln was one of 31 men appointed to sit on the Session. In 1532, the Parliament of Scotland passed an act reconstituting the Session as a College of Justice with 15 members. Myln was named as the inaugural president.

Myln's death can be placed in 1548 or 1549, as he was succeeded as president by Robert Reid in the latter year.

== Notes ==
Catholic Church titles
| Preceded by Patrick Panter | Abbot of Cambuskenneth; 1519 – 1548/9 | Succeeded by David Panter as commendator |
Legal offices
| Preceded by Office Created | President of the College of Justice; 1532–1548/9 | Succeeded by Robert Reid, Bishop of Orkney |
