= OPG =

OPG may refer to:

- Osteoprotegerin
- Office of the Public Guardian

- Office of the Public Guardian (Scotland)
- Office of the Public Guardian (England and Wales)

- Office of HM Paymaster General
- Online Policy Group
- Ontario Power Generation
- Open Government Partnership
- Optical parametric generator
- Orthopantomograph or orthopantogram, a panoramic radiograph
