= William Scott, Lord Balwearie =

Scottish judge

Sir William Scott, Lord Balwearie (died 1532), or William Scot, was a Scottish judge.

== Biography ==
Scott was elder son of Sir William Scott of Balwearie, by Isobel, daughter of Sir John Moncrieff of Moncrieff. He accompanied James IV in his expedition into England in 1513, and, being taken prisoner at the battle of Flodden, was obliged to sell a portion of his lands of Strathmiglo to purchase his ransom. In February 1524 he was chosen a commissioner to parliament, when he was appointed one of the lords of the articles for the barons, an honour frequently afterwards conferred on him, although obtained by no one else under the rank of a peer. On 24 November he was styled a justice, in the absence of the justice-general, in a commission appointed to do justice on the "malt makers of Leith for common oppression through the exorbitant dearth raised by them, and of their causing through the whole realm". On the institution of the college of justice on 13 May 1532, he was nominated the first justice on the temporal side, but died before 19 November of the same year.

By his wife, Janet Lundy, daughter of Thomas Lundy of Lundy, he had two sons, Sir William, father of Sir James Scott (fl. 1579–1606), and Thomas (1480?–1539).
