= Cambuskenneth Abbey =

Abbey in Stirling, Scotland

Coordinates: 56°07′24″N 3°55′04″W

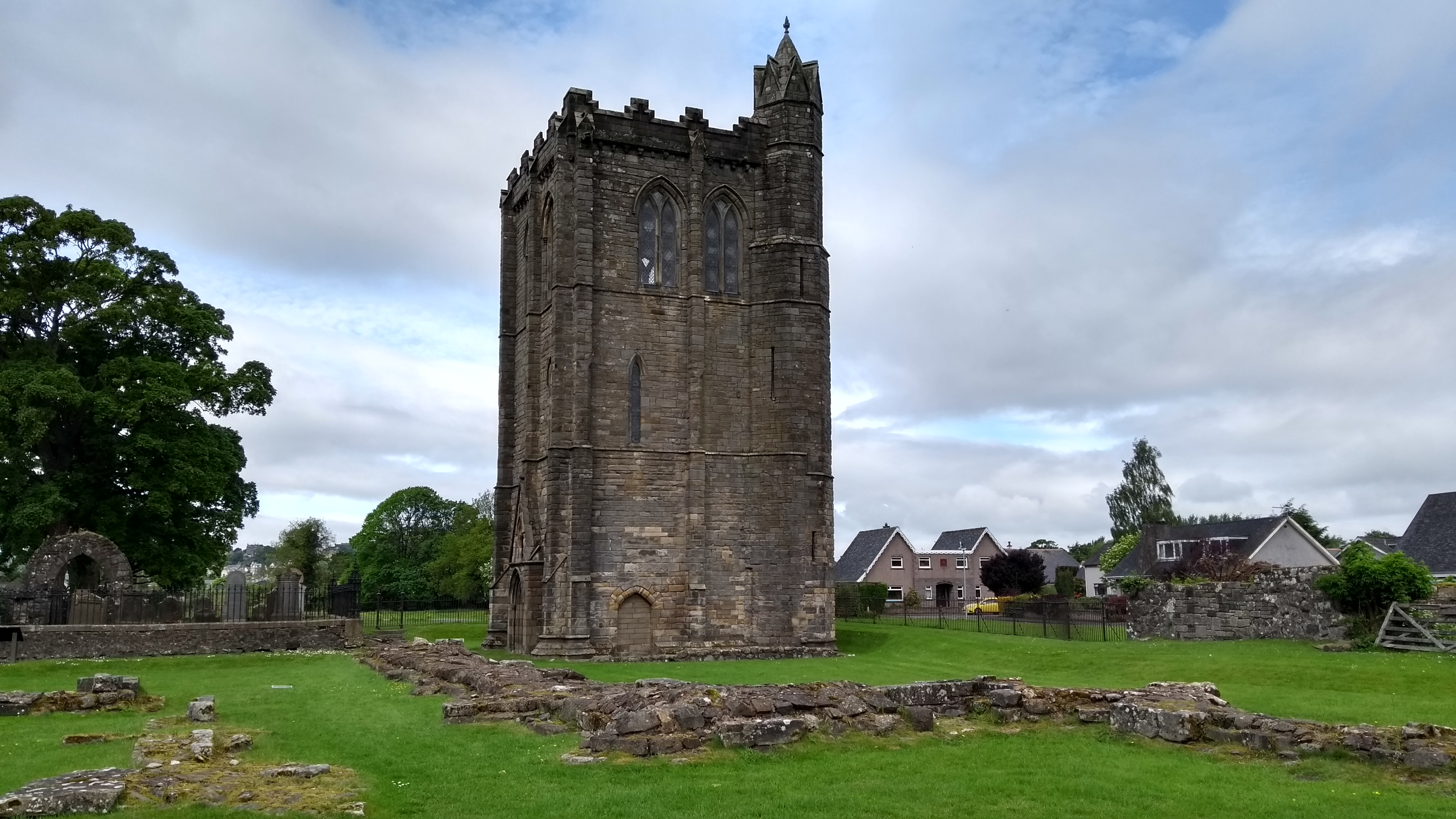
- The bell tower of Cambuskenneth Abbey
- Interactive map of Cambuskenneth Abbey

Monastery information
- Full name: Abbey of St Mary of Cambuskenneth
- Other name: Abbey of St Mary of Stirling
- Order: Canons Regular
- Established: 1140
- Disestablished: 1560

People
- Founder: David I of Scotland
- Abbot: David Arnot (1503–1509); Patrick Paniter (1513–1519)
- Important associated figures: Robert the Bruce, Edward I

The Abbey of St Mary of Cambuskenneth, commonly known as Cambuskenneth Abbey, was a provostry of Canons Regular located on an area of land enclosed by a meander of the River Forth near Stirling in Scotland. The abbey today is largely reduced to its foundations, however its bell tower remains. The neighbouring modern village of Cambuskenneth is named after it.

== History ==
=== Establishment ===
Cambuskenneth Abbey was founded by order of King David I of Scotland around the year 1140. It was a daughter house of the French Arrouaise Order, the only one to exist in Scotland. The Arrouaise canons also ran abbeys and churches in land owned by King David in England. The Arrouaise were a distinctive religious congregation among canons regular at the time of the abbey's founding due to their Cistercian-inspired more severe way of life; they gradually relaxed their more monastic practices and eventually became indistinguible from other groups of canons regular.

Dedicated to the Virgin Mary, it was initially known as the Abbey of St Mary of Stirling and sometimes simply as Stirling Abbey. In 1147 Pope Eugene III declared the Abbey had his protection through a papal bull, a status confirmed by both Pope Alexander III in 1164 and Pope Celestine III in 1195. The abbey becomes known as Cambuskenneth rather than Stirling from around 1207 as shown by papal bulls of the time.

Cambuskenneth was one of the more important abbeys in Scotland, due in part to its proximity to the Royal Burgh of Stirling, a leading urban centre of the country and sometime capital. The establishment of abbeys in Scotland, including Cambuskenneth, under David I provided a new influence in Scottish public life by providing sources of literate individuals for the royal court and administrative duties.

=== 14th century and connections to Bruce kings ===
Its status as a royal abbey in the neighbourhood of a major national stronghold may be compared to that of Holyrood Abbey vis-à-vis Edinburgh. Notable events include in 1303 Edward I of England prayed and received an oath of loyalty from Robert Wishart, Bishop of Glasgow, at the Abbey. In 1308 Niall mac Cailein, Gilbert II de la Hay and other nobles swore allegiance to Robert the Bruce. The connection to Robert the Bruce continues with a parliament being held at the abbey in 1314, five months after victory at the Battle of Bannockburn. The spoils of the Battle at Bannockburn were shared out on the grounds of the abbey. In 1326 another parliament was held where nobles and clergy swore an oath to the king and confirm the succession of his son David II. So frequently was the abbey used for Parliaments during the 14th century that one of the connected buildings on the site became known as "Parliament Hall".

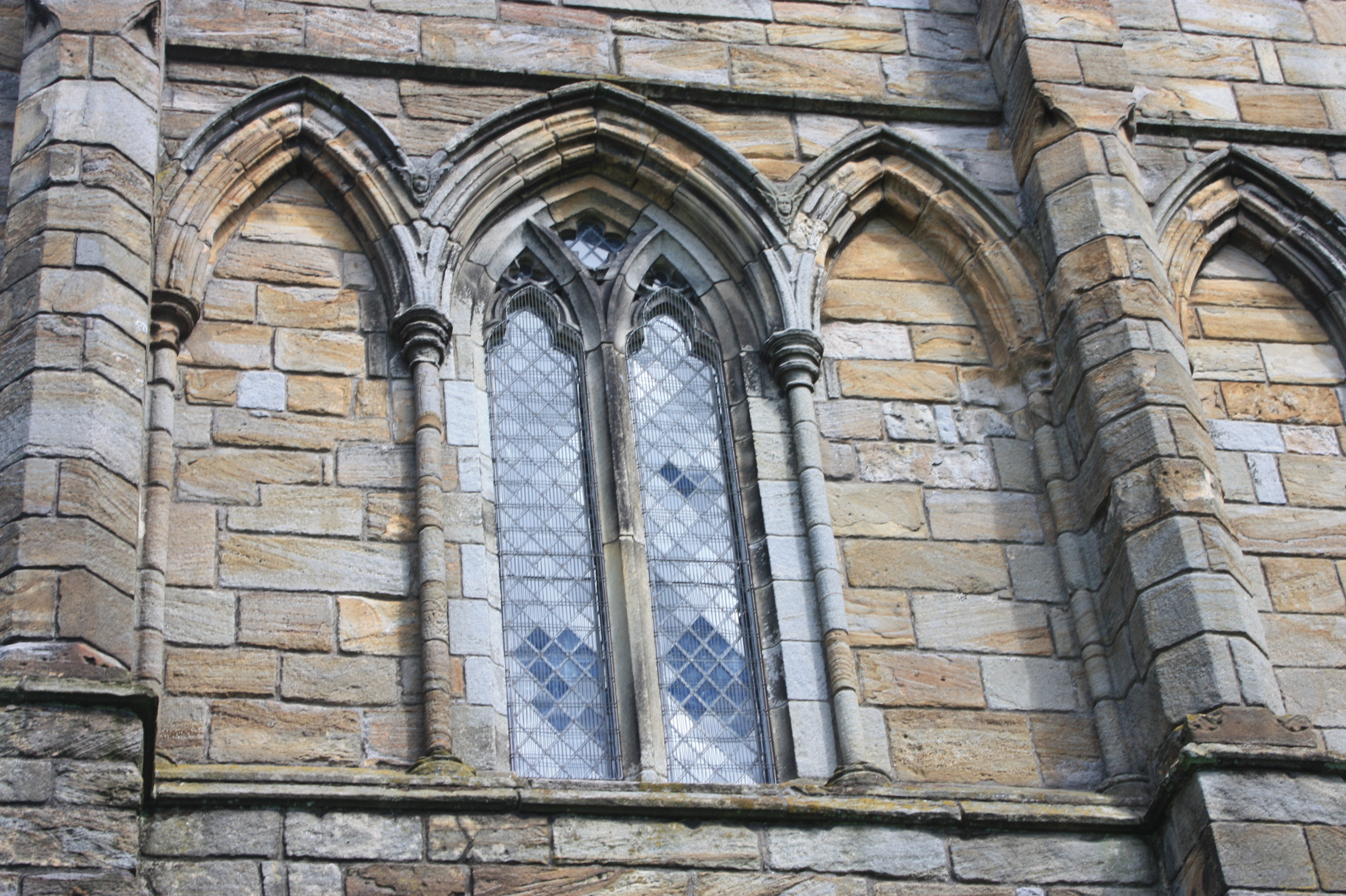
Window details at Cambuskenneth Abbey

The abbey continued to have close links to the heirs of Robert the Bruce, Robert II granted charters at the abbey in 1380 and accounts show that he stayed at the site for a number of days, while his son Robert III conducted royal business at the abbey in 1392.

In 1486 Margaret of Denmark died at Stirling Castle and was buried at the abbey. In 1488 her husband, James III was killed at the Battle of Sauchieburn and his body was brought to Cambuskenneth Abbey for burial. His tomb was finished in 1502 and painted by David Pratt. Following the dismantling of the bulk of the abbey the tomb was damaged and it was restored in 1865, funded by Queen Victoria. It stands within a railed enclosure at the east end of the abbey ruins.

=== Later history and closure ===
Patrick Paniter became the Abbot of Cambuskenneth in 1513, he is the most notable individual to hold the title as he also held the position of secretary to James V and also fought at the Battle of Flodden in the same year. He was succeeded by Alexander Myln in 1517. Myln went on to be the inaugural president of the College of Justice.

The abbey fell into disuse during the Scottish Reformation. In 1560 the abbey was placed under the jurisdiction of the military governor of Stirling Castle, John Erskine, who had much of the stonework removed and used in construction projects in the castle. His nephew Adam Erskine was made Commendator of the Abbey. Abbey Craig, on which the Wallace Monument sits, is named such because of its siting near Cambuskenneth Abbey.

== Abbey today ==
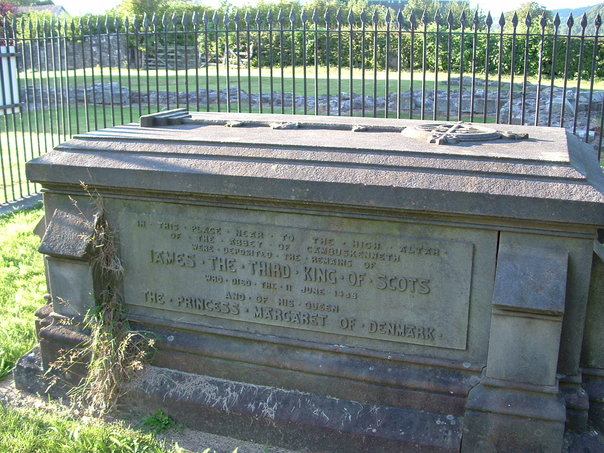
The tomb of James III, King of Scots

The abbey was acquired by the crown in 1908, and it is managed by Historic Scotland. The abbey is open to visitors during the summer months. The foundations of the abbey church and other ancillary buildings are visible on the site, much of which date from around the 13th century. Only the 13th-century campanile is intact, following an extensive renovation in 1859. Also on the site is an historic graveyard, which includes the grave of James III of Scotland and his wife Margaret of Denmark, as well as many of the Abbots of Cambuskenneth.

== See also ==
- Abbeys and priories in Scotland
