= Office of the Accountant of Court =

- Oifis Cunntasair na Cùirte

Agency overview
- Formed: 1849; 177 years ago
- Type: Public body
- Jurisdiction: Scotland
- Headquarters: Hadrian House, Callendar Business Park, Callendar Road, Falkirk, FK1 1XRD
- Agency executive: Fiona Brown, Accountant of Court
- Parent agency: Scottish Courts and Tribunals Service
- Key document: Judicial Factors Act 1849
- Website: The Accountant of Court

Map
- Scotland in the UK and Europe

The Office of the Accountant of Court (Scottish Gaelic: Oifis Cunntasair na Cùirte) is a public body which is a constituent part of the Supreme Courts of Scotland. The Accountant of Court is administered by the Scottish Courts and Tribunals Service. The Accountant of Court's Office formerly dealt with guardianship cases in respect of adults with incapacity. However, following the introduction of the Adults with Incapacity (Scotland) Act 2000 by the Scottish Parliament, these cases were transferred to the new Office of the Public Guardian (Scotland).

Based in Falkirk, the office of Accountant of Court, also known as the Accountant of the Court of Session (see Court of Session), was established by the Judicial Factors Act 1849, and their role was further defined by the Children (Scotland) Act 1995.

== Remit and jurisdiction ==
=== Supervision of Judicial Factors ===
The Accountant of Court is responsible for ensuring that those appointed by the Courts as Judicial Factor in terms of the Judicial Factors Act 1849 manage the estates in their charge properly.

A Judicial Factor is an Officer of the Court, who is appointed by the Court in complex or difficult cases, where a particular problem has been identified and where the estate (known as the Judicial Factory Estate) is without any other legal protection or administration.

The Accountant of Court will generally superintend the actions of a Judicial Factor and provide them with the necessary guidance and direction required progress a case. In addition the Accountant of Court is also responsible for investigating any concerns or complaints that are raised against a Judicial Factor.

The Accountant of Court is also responsible for supervising Enforcement Administrators appointed by the Courts to recover assets confiscated in terms of the Proceeds of Crime (Scotland) Act 1995.

=== Property due to children under the age of 16 years ===
With the introduction of the Children (Scotland) Act 1995 the Accountant of Court became responsible for the administration and supervision of property that is due to a minor in Scotland (the age of legal capacity under Scots law is 16). In terms of sections 9 & 13 of sections of the Children (Scotland) Act 1995 act, the Accountant of Court has a responsibility to ensure that the funds or property owned by or due to the child are properly administered and managed.

=== Consignation of Funds ===
The Court of Session Consignation (Scotland) Act 1895 made the Accountant of Court custodian for all consigned funds for the Court of Session. The Accountant of Court is also responsible for holding unclaimed dividends and unapplied balances lodged relative to liquidation/administration proceedings, dissenting shareholders and Judicial Factories.

The Accountant of Court will hold the funds until such times as the rightful party makes a successful claim and uplifts their funds for a period of 7 years at which point the funds are remitted to the Secretary of State.

=== Administration of Child Trust Funds ===
Under the Child Trust Funds Act 2004 the Accountant of Court was authorised to administer Child Trust Fund accounts on behalf of a child under the age of 16 where there is no person who has parental responsibilities. On 1 October 2017 new regulations were introduced which allowed HM Treasury to transfer authority to administer these Child Trust Funds to The Share Foundation.

== See also ==
- College of Justice
- Court of Session
- Capacity (law)
- Children's Hearings
- Family law
- Personal finance
- Property
- Trustee
- Ward of court
