= Lord President of the Court of Session =

Most senior judge in Scotland

Lord President of the Court of Session and Lord Justice General of Scotland
- Scottish Gaelic: Àrd-mhorair Cùirt an t-Seisein
- Logo of the Lord President of the Court of Session

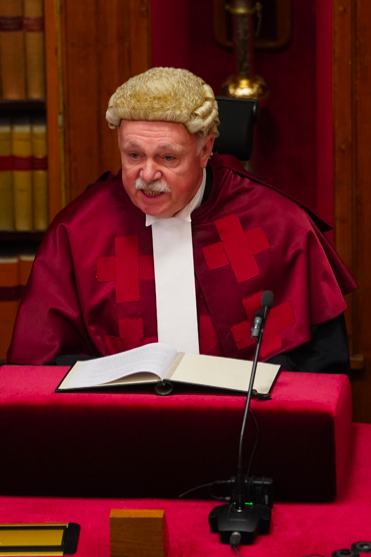
- Incumbent; Lord Pentland since 3 February 2025
- Style: The Right Honourable
- Appointer: Monarch on the advice of the First Minister
- Term length: Life tenure with compulsory retirement at 75
- Inaugural holder: Alexander Mylne, Abbot of Cambuskenneth
- Formation: 1532
- Deputy: Lord Justice Clerk
- Salary: £290,213 (Salary Group 1.1)
- Website: Roles and Jurisdiction | Judicial Office for Scotland

The Lord President of the Court of Session and Lord Justice General (Scottish Gaelic: Àrd-mhorair Cùirt an t-Seisein) is the most senior judge in Scotland, the head of the judiciary, and the presiding judge of the College of Justice, the Court of Session, and the High Court of Justiciary. The Lord President holds the title of Lord Justice General of Scotland and the head of the High Court of Justiciary ex officio, as the two offices were combined in 1836. The Lord President has authority over any court established under Scots law, except for the Supreme Court of the United Kingdom and the Court of the Lord Lyon.

The current Lord President of the Court of Session is Lord Pentland, who was appointed to the position on 3 February 2025 succeeding Lord Carloway They are paid according to salary group 1.1 of the Judicial Salaries Scale, which in 2026 is £290,213.

== Remit and jurisdiction ==
=== Head of the judiciary ===
As Lord President of the Court of Session and is the most senior judge in Scotland, the head of the judiciary, and the presiding judge of the College of Justice, and the Court of Session. Under Section 2(6) of the Judiciary and Courts (Scotland) Act 2008, the Lord President has authority over the judiciary of any court established under Scots law, except for the Supreme Court of the United Kingdom and the Court of the Lord Lyon.

References in this section to the Scottish judiciary are references to the judiciary of any court established under the law of Scotland (other than the Supreme Court of the United Kingdom).

— Section 2(5), Judiciary and Courts (Scotland) Act 2008

The Scottish Land Court, which until 1 April 2017 was administered separately, was transferred to the Scottish Courts and Tribunals Service. The 2008 act states:

The Lord President is the Head of the Scottish Judiciary.

— Section 2(1), Judiciary and Courts (Scotland) Act 2008

The Lord President is supported by the Judicial Office for Scotland which was established on 1 April 2010 as a result of the Judiciary and Courts (Scotland) Act 2008, and the Lord President chairs the corporate board of the Scottish Courts and Tribunals Service. The Lord President, and the wider judiciary, is advised on matters relating to the administration of justice by the Judicial Council for Scotland, which is a non-statutory body established in 2007. There had been plans for a statutory judges' council but these plans were abandoned in favour of a non-statutory council convened by the Lord President.

=== Inner House ===
The Lord President presides over the 1st Division of the Inner House of the Court of Session. The Inner House is the part of the Court of Session which acts as a court of appeal for cases decided the Outer House and Sheriff Appeal Court, and hearing appeals on questions of law from the Sheriff Appeal Court, Scottish Land Court, Court of the Lord Lyon, and the Lands Tribunal for Scotland.

=== Official Oath ===
In Scotland the Official Oath is taken before the Lord President of the Court of Session.

=== Lord Justice General ===
The Lord President is also the Lord Justice General of Scotland and the head of the High Court of Justiciary ex officio, with the two offices having been combined in 1836.The office of Lord Justice General is derived from the justiciars who were appointed from at least the twelfth century. From around 1567 onwards it was held heritably by the Earl of Argyll until the heritability was resigned to the Crown in 1607.

== Officeholders ==
=== Justiciars ===
(called Lord Chief Justices by Scot of Scotstarvet).

- Argadus, Captain of Argyll, in the reign of Ethodius
- Comes Dunetus; in the reign of King William the Lion. (Donnchad II, Earl of Fife)
- William Comyn
- Richard Comyn
- David, Earl of Huntingdon (died 1219)
- Walter Clifford, Justiciary of the Lothians
- 1216: Allan, Justiciary to King Alexander II
- 1224: William Cumin, Earl of Buchan
- Walter (died 1241), son of Allan High Steward of Scotland
- 1239: William, Earl of Ross, "Lord Chief Justice of Scotland"
- Alexander (d.1283), High Steward of Scotland to King Alexander II
- 1253: Alexander Cumin, Earl of Buchan
- 1366: Robert de Erskine, Justiciary South of the Forth for King David II
- bef 1372: Alan de Lawedre of The Bass, Whitslaid, & Haltoun, Justiciary South of the Forth, (he received a pension for holding this post in 1374).
- 1437: James Douglas, Earl of Avondale and Lord Balveny
- 1446: Patrick de Ogilvy, Justiciary South of the Forth
- 1457: John, Lord Lindsay of the Byres, Justiciary South of the Forth
- William Sinclair, 3rd Earl of Orkney & Caithness (d.1480), Justiciary North of the Forth for King James II
- 1477: John Haldane of Gleneagles, Justiciary North of the Forth
- Patrick Hepburn, 1st Lord Hailes (died after 1482), and Robert, 2nd Lord Lyle, Justiciaries South of the Forth
- Andrew, Earl of Crawfurd, and George Gordon, 2nd Earl of Huntly, Justiciaries North of the Forth
- 1488: Robert Lyle, 2nd Lord Lyle (died c. 1497), "Lord Chief Justice"
- 1489: John Lyon, 3rd Lord Glamis (died 1 April 1497), and John Drummond, 1st Lord Drummond: "Justice-General"
- 1492: Robert Lyle, 2nd Lord Lyle, and John Lyon, 3rd Lord Glamis
- 1494: John Drummond, 1st Lord Drummond (died c1519)
- 1504: Andrew Gray, 2nd Lord Gray, and John Kennedy, 2nd Lord Kennedy
- 1514: Colin Campbell, 3rd Earl of Argyll
- 1526: Archibald Douglas of Kilspindie
- 1532: Alexander Mylne, Abbot of Cambuskenneth
- 1537: Archibald Campbell, 4th Earl of Argyll
- 1567: Sir Colin Campbell, 6th Earl of Argyll, (d.1584) (heritably)
- 1578: Sir Colin Campbell, 6th Earl of Argyll, (re-appointment?)
- 1589: Archibald Campbell, 7th Earl of Argyll, (who exchanged the heritable office of Lord Chief Justice in 1607, for the heritable Lieutenancy of Argyll and Lorn, and most of The Isles).

=== Lord Justice-General ===
| | From | Until | Remarks |
|---|---|---|---|
| William Graham, 1st Earl of Airth, 7th Earl of Menteith | 11 July 1628 | 8 November 1633 | |
| Sir William Elphinstone | 23 December 1635 | 13 November 1641 | |
| Sir Thomas Hope, younger of Kerse | 18 November 1641 | 23 August 1643 | |
| William Cunningham, 8th Earl of Glencairn | 13 November 1646 | 15 February 1649 | |
| John Kennedy, 6th Earl of Cassilis | 15 March 1649 | 9 August 1651 | |
| John Murray, 2nd Earl of Atholl | 16 August 1661 | 21 May 1675 | |
| Alexander Stuart, 5th Earl of Moray | 21 May 1675 | 5 May 1676 | |
| Archibald Primrose, Lord Carrington | 5 May 1676 | 30 September 1678 | |
| George Mackenzie, Lord Tarbat | 30 September 1678 | 1 June 1680 | |
| William Douglas, 3rd Earl of Queensberry | 1 June 1680 | 1 March 1682 | |
| James Drummond, 4th Earl of Perth | 1 March 1682 | 13 June 1684 | |
| George Livingston, 3rd Earl of Linlithgow | 13 June 1684 | 3 August 1689 | |
| Robert Ker, 4th Earl of Lothian | 3 August 1689 | 15 February 1703 | |
| George Mackenzie, 1st Earl of Cromartie | 17 October 1704 | 23 October 1710 | |
| Archibald Campbell, 3rd Duke of Argyll | 23 October 1710 | 15 April 1761 | |
| John Hay, 4th Marquess of Tweeddale | 27 June 1761 | 9 December 1762 | |
| Charles Douglas, 3rd Duke of Queensberry | 15 April 1763 | 22 October 1778 | |
| David Murray, 2nd Earl of Mansfield | 23 October 1778 | 1794 | |
| James Graham, 3rd Duke of Montrose | 14 January 1795 | 30 December 1836 | |

=== Lord President ===
| | From | Until | Remarks |
|---|---|---|---|
| Alexander Myln, Abbot of Cambuskenneth | 1532 | 1548 | Abbot of Cambuskenneth (1519–1548) |
| Robert Reid, Bishop of Orkney | 1549 | 1558 | Abbot of Kinloss (1528–1553); Commendator of Beauly (1531–1553); Bishop of Orkney (1541–1558) |
| Henry Sinclair, Bishop of Ross | 1558 | 1565 | Commendator of Kilwinning (1541–1550); Dean of Glasgow (1550–1561); Bishop of Ross (1558–1565) |
| John Sinclair, Bishop of Brechin | 1565 | 1566 | Appointed a Lord of Session, 1540; Bishop of Brechin (1565–1566) |
| William Baillie, Lord Provand | 1566 | 1567 | Appointed a Lord of Session, 1550 |
| James Balfour, Lord Pittendreich | 1567 | 1568 | Appointed a Lord of Session, 1561 |
| William Baillie, Lord Provand | 1568 | 1593 | |
| Alexander Seton, 1st Lord Fyvie | 1593 | 1604 | Appointed a Lord of Session, 1586; Provost of Edinburgh (1598–1608); Lord Chancellor of Scotland (1604–1622); Lord High Commissioner to the Parliament of Scotland (1612–1621) |
| James Elphinstone, 1st Lord Balmerino | 1605 | 1609 | Appointed a Lord of Session, 1587; Secretary of State (1598–1609) |
| John Preston of Fenton Barns, Lord Fentonbarns | 1609 | 1616 | Appointed a Lord of Session, 1595 |
| Thomas Hamilton, 1st Earl of Melrose | 1616 | 1625 | Appointed a Lord of Session, 1592; Lord Advocate (1595–1596 and 1596–1612); Lord Clerk Register (1612) |
| Sir James Skene of Curriehill | 1626 | 1633 | Lord Clerk Register (1594–1612); Appointed a Lord of Session, 1594 |
| Robert Spottiswood, Lord Newabbey | 1633 | 1646 | Appointed a Lord of Session, 1622 |
| Sir John Gilmour of Craigmillar | 1661 | 1671 | Commissioner for Edinburghshire (1661–1671) |
| James Dalrymple, 1st Viscount Stair | 1671 | 1681 | Appointed a Lord of Session, 1661; Commissioner for Wigtownshire (1672–1674, 1678 and 1681–1682) |
| George Gordon, 1st Earl of Aberdeen | 1681 | 1682 | Commissioner for Aberdeenshire (1669–1674, 1678 and 1681–1682); Appointed a Lord of Session, 1680; Lord Chancellor of Scotland (1682–1684) |
| Sir David Falconer of Newton | 1682 | 1685 | Appointed a Lord of Session, 1676; Commissioner for Forfarshire (1685) |
| Sir George Lockhart of Carnwath | 1685 | 31 March 1689 | Appointed Dean of the Faculty of Advocates, 1672; Commissioner for Lanarkshire (1681–1682 and 1685–1686) |
| James Dalrymple, 1st Viscount Stair | 28 October 1689 | 25 November 1695 | Appointed a Lord of Session, 1661; Commissioner for Wigtownshire (1672–1674, 1678 and 1681–1682) |
| Hew Dalrymple, Lord North Berwick | 17 March 1698 | 20 June 1737 | Commissioner for New Galloway (1690–1702); Dean of the Faculty of Advocates (1695–1698); Commissioner for North Berwick (1702–1707) |
| Duncan Forbes, Lord Culloden | 20 June 1737 | 4 June 1748 | MP for Ayr Burghs (1721–1722); MP for Inverness Burghs (1722–1737); Lord Advocate (1725–1737) |
| Robert Dundas, Lord Arniston, the Elder | 4 June 1748 | 26 August 1753 | Solicitor General for Scotland (1717–1720); Lord Advocate (1720–1725); MP for Midlothian (1722–1737); Senator of the College of Justice (1737–1753) |
| Robert Craigie of Glendoick, Lord Craigie | 22 January 1754 | 10 March 1760 | MP for Tain Burghs (1742–1747); Lord Advocate (1742–1746) |
| Robert Dundas, Lord Arniston, the Younger | 30 April 1760 | 13 December 1787 | Solicitor General for Scotland (1742–1746); Dean of the Faculty of Advocates (1746–1760); Lord Advocate (1754–1760); MP for Midlothian (1754–1760) |
| Thomas Miller, Lord Glenlee | 22 December 1787 | 27 September 1789 | MP for Dumfries Burghs (1761–1766); Solicitor General for Scotland (1759–1760); Lord Advocate (1760–1766); Lord Justice Clerk (1766–1787) |
| Ilay Campbell, Lord Succoth | 26 October 1789 | 31 August 1808 | Solicitor General for Scotland (1783–1784); MP for Clyde Burghs (1784–1790); Lord Advocate (1784–1789) |
| Robert Blair, Lord Avontoun | 31 August 1808 | 20 May 1811 | Solicitor General for Scotland (1789–1806); Dean of the Faculty of Advocates (1801–1808) |
| Charles Hope, Lord Granton | 10 October 1811 | 20 July 1841 | Lord Advocate (1801–1804); MP for Dumfries Burghs (1802); MP for Edinburgh (1803–1805); Lord Justice Clerk (1804–1811) |
| David Boyle, Lord Boyle | 7 October 1841 | 5 May 1852 | MP for Ayrshire (1807–1811); Solicitor General for Scotland (1807–1811); Lord Justice Clerk (1811–1841) |
| Duncan McNeill, 1st Baron Colonsay | 14 May 1852 | 25 February 1867 | MP for Argyllshire (1843–1851); Solicitor General for Scotland (1834–1835 & 1841–1842); Lord Advocate (1842–1846) |
| John Inglis, Lord Glencorse | 25 February 1867 | 20 August 1891 | MP for Stamford (1858); Solicitor General for Scotland (1852); Lord Advocate (1852 & 1858); Lord Justice Clerk (1858–1867) |
| James Robertson, Baron Robertson | 21 September 1891 | 21 November 1899 | MP for Buteshire (1885–1891); Solicitor General for Scotland (1885–1886 & 1886–1888); Lord Advocate (1888–1891); Lord of Appeal in Ordinary (1899–1909) |
| John Balfour, 1st Baron Kinross | 21 November 1899 | 22 January 1905 | MP for Clackmannan and Kinross (1880–1899); Solicitor General for Scotland (1880–1881); Lord Advocate (1881–1885, 1886 & 1892–1895) |
| Andrew Murray, 1st Baron Dunedin | 4 February 1905 | 14 October 1913 | MP for Buteshire (1891–1905); Solicitor General for Scotland (1905–1909); Lord Advocate (1909–1913); Secretary for Scotland (1903–1905); Lord of Appeal in Ordinary (1913–1932) |
| Alexander Ure, 1st Baron Strathclyde | 14 October 1913 | 1 April 1920 | MP for Linlithgowshire (1895–1913); Solicitor General for Scotland (1891–1892 & 1895–1896); Lord Advocate (1896–1903) |
| James Avon Clyde, Lord Clyde | 1 April 1920 | 1 April 1935 | Solicitor General for Scotland (1905); MP for Edinburgh West (1909–1918) and Edinburgh North (1918–1920); Lord Advocate (1916–1920) |
| Wilfrid Normand, Baron Normand | 1 April 1935 | 6 January 1947 | MP for Edinburgh West (1931–1935); Solicitor General for Scotland (1929 & 1931–1933); Lord Advocate (1933–1935); Lord of Appeal in Ordinary (1947–1953) |
| Thomas Cooper, 1st Baron Cooper of Culross | 6 January 1947 | 23 December 1954 | MP for Edinburgh West (1935–1941); Solicitor General for Scotland (1935); Lord Advocate (1935–1941); Senator of the College of Justice (1941–1954); Lord Justice Clerk (1941-1947); Lord President of the Court of Session (1947–1954) |
| James Latham Clyde, Lord Clyde | 23 December 1954 | 25 April 1972 | MP for Edinburgh North (1950–1954); Lord Advocate (1951–1954); Senator of the College of Justice (1954–1972) |
| George Emslie, Baron Emslie | 25 April 1972 | 27 September 1989 | Dean of the Faculty of Advocates (1965–1970); Senator of the College of Justice (1970–1989) |
| David Hope, Baron Hope of Craighead | 27 September 1989 | 1 October 1996 | Dean of the Faculty of Advocates (1986–1989); Senator of the College of Justice (1989–1996); Lord of Appeal in Ordinary (1996–2009); Second Senior Law Lord (2009); Deputy President of the Supreme Court (2009–2013) |
| Alan Rodger, Baron Rodger of Earlsferry | 1 October 1996 | 13 November 2002 | Solicitor General for Scotland (1989–1992); Lord Advocate (1992–1995); Senator of the College of Justice (1995–2001); Lord of Appeal in Ordinary (2001–2009); Justice of the Supreme Court (2009–2011) |
| William Cullen, Baron Cullen of Whitekirk | 13 November 2002 | 2 December 2005 | Chairman of the Medical Appeals Tribunals (1977–1986); Senator of the College of Justice (1986–2005); Lord Justice Clerk (1997–2002) |
| Arthur Hamilton, Lord Hamilton | 2 December 2005 | 8 June 2012 | Chairman of the Medical Appeals Tribunals (1989–1992); President of the Pensions Appeal Tribunal in Scotland (1992–1995); Senator of the College of Justice (1995–2012) |
| Brian Gill, Lord Gill | 8 June 2012 | 31 May 2015 | Senator of the College of Justice (1994–2015); Lord Justice Clerk (2001–2012) |
| Colin Sutherland, Lord Carloway | 18 December 2015 | 3 February 2025 | Senator of the College of Justice (2000–3 February 2025); Lord Justice Clerk (2012–2015) |
| Paul Cullen, Lord Pentland | 3 February 2025 | Incumbent | Senator of the College of Justice (5 November 2008–present) |

== See also ==
- List of Senators of the College of Justice
- List of Leading Scottish Legal Cases
