= Henry Sinclair (bishop) =

Scottish bishop

- Bishop of Ross
- Church: Roman Catholic Church/ Church of Scotland
- See: Diocese of Ross
- In office: 1558–1565
- Predecessor: David Panter
- Successor: John Lesley
- Previous posts: Commendator of Kilwinning (1541–1550); Dean of Glasgow (1550–1561)

Personal details
- Born: 1508 Scotland
- Died: 2 January 1565 (aged 56–57) Paris, France

Henry Sinclair (1508–1565) was a Scottish lord-president of the court of session and bishop of Ross.

Henry Sinclair was brother of Oliver Sinclair. He studied at St. Leonard's College, St. Andrews and was appointed lord of session in 1537. In 1541 he was named abbot or perpetual commendator of the abbey of Kilwinning. He was the negotiator of a peace treaty between Flanders and Scotland in 1548 and was appointed dean of Glasgow in 1550. Between 1550 and 1554 he was in France. He was a commissioner for the Treaty of Carlisle in 1556, and for that of Upsettlington in 1559. He was appointed President of the Court of Session, and Bishop of Ross. In 1561 he became a member of Queen Mary's privy council. Denounced by John Knox, he maintained a neutral religious attitude. He wrote additions to Boece's History of Scotland. Sinclair died at Paris in January 1565.

== Life ==
Henry Sinclair was the second son of Sir Oliver Sinclair of Roslin and his third wife Isabella Livingstone. He was a brother of John Sinclair (died 1566), bishop of Brechin, and Oliver Sinclair, general at Solway Moss.

He studied at the University of St. Andrews, being incorporated in St. Leonard's College in 1521. Having gained the special favour of James V, he was admitted on 13 November 1537 an ordinary lord of session. On 16 December of the same year he obtained the rectory of Glasgow from Archbishop Dunbar; in 1541 he was named abbot or perpetual commendator of the abbey of Kilwinning; and in 1550 he exchanged this office with Gavin Hamilton for the deanery of Glasgow. While he was dean he bought and sold some land from Melrose Abbey making a good profit.

In 1548 he was sent into Flanders to treat for a peace between Flanders and Scotland. On 11 August 1550, he obtained a safe-conduct to go into France, and apparently did not return to Scotland until 1554. Immediately on his return he persuaded Robert Reid, the bishop of Orkney, then Lord President of the Court of Session, to make certain statutes for the abbreviation of the processes and the reform of other abuses. He was a commissioner for the Treaty of Carlisle in 1556, and for the Treaty of Upsettlington in 1559. On 2 December 1558, he succeeded the bishop of Orkney as Lord President of the Court of Session, and on the death of Bishop David Panter in the same year, he obtained a gift of the temporalities of the see of Ross, being consecrated – after some delay in obtaining the papal sanction – in 1560. In 1561 he was chosen one of Queen Mary's privy council of twelve, the other eleven members being all laymen. The same year he and other bishops offered to give up a fourth of the rents of their benefices. On 28 December 1563, he was appointed one of a commission for the erection of jurisdiction in various parts of the country.

Apparently Sinclair possessed no special predilections for either the old or the new religion. He was content to retain the temporalities of his bishopric, and, as president of the court of session, he made it his duty to see that proper regard was paid to the laws in actual force, whether they favoured Protestants or Catholics. Thus, when the queen sought his advice in regard to the prosecution of several Catholics who had observed the mass, he advised "that she must see her laws kept, or else she would get no obedience". On the other hand, when John Knox in 1563 penned a letter to "the brethren in all quarters" to assemble for the protection of certain persons who had made forcible entrance into the chapel of Holyrood during mass, Sinclair sent a copy of the letter to the queen at Stirling. Knox, on this account, denounces him as "ane perfect hypocrite, and ane conjured enemy to Christ Jesus". Yet Knox himself admits that Sinclair voted for his absolution when brought before the council. "The bishop", he says, "answered cauldlie, 'Your grace may consider that it is neither affection to the man [Knox], nor yet love to his profession, that moveth me to absolve him; but the simple truth, which plainly appears in his defence'". It is clear that Sinclair was capable of acting justly, if not generously, towards an avowed enemy.

On the appearance of Bishop Jewell's Apologia in 1562, Randolph, the ambassador of Elizabeth in Scotland, sent a copy to the bishop of Ross, expressing at the same time his intention to send one to the archbishop of St. Andrews, "not", he says, "to do them good, which I know is impossible, but to heap mischief upon their heads". Nevertheless, Randolph afterwards describes him as "of that sort of men the best in Scotland". On 20 February 1564, Queen Mary applied to Elizabeth for a safe-conduct for Sinclair to go into France, that he "might seek cure and remedie of a certain maladie". The malady was the stone, for which he underwent an operation; but he died at Paris on 2 January 1565.

== Works ==
Sinclair wrote some additions to Hector Boece's History of Scotland, which his brother, John Sinclair, bishop of Brechin, brought from Paris after his death. It is supposed that John, rather than Henry, was the author of Sinclair's Practicks, a legal work contained in manuscript in the Advocates' Library, Edinburgh.

Dempster (Historia Eccl.) and, following him, Thomas Tanner (Bibliographia Britannica) split this Sinclair into two persons, one of them being represented as dean of Glasgow and lord of session and nephew of the bishop of Ross. The nephew is credited by Dempster with the following legal works: Legum Romanorum ad Leges Scotiæ Municipales Reductio, Lib. i.; Novæ Judiciarii ordinis Leges, Lib. i.; Abrogatio Juris Antiqui, Lib. i. Henderson wrote in the Dictionary of National Biography that "These appellations are doubtless all paraphrastic amplifications by Dempster of the full title of the Practicks above referred to".

== Sinclair and Conrad Gesner ==
Sinclair supplied descriptions and illustrations of Scottish animals to the Swiss naturalist Conrad Gesner for inclusion in his Historiae Animalium. These included the solan goose found on the Bass rock, the Scottish bloodhound, and the White cattle of Cumbernauld.

== Notes ==
Religious titles
Preceded by Alexander Hamilton	Commendator of Kilwinning; 1541–1550	Succeeded by Gavin Hamilton
Preceded by Gavin Hamilton	Dean of Glasgow; 1550–1561	Succeeded by James Balfour
Preceded by David Panter	Bishop of Ross; 1558–1565	Succeeded by John Lesley
