= Prior of Beauly =

The Prior of Beauly (later Commendator of Beauly) was the head of the Valliscaulian monastic community and lands of Beauly Priory, Beauly, Inverness-shire. It was probably founded in 1230. It became Cistercian on 16 April 1510. The following are a list of priors and commendators:

== List of priors ==
- Geoffrey, 1312
- Robert, 1341–1357
- Simon, 1362
- Maurice, 1336x1372
- Thomas, x 1407
- Matthew alias Walter, 1407–1411
- Cristin MacDonald (Donaldson), 1411
- Gilbert MacPherson, 1430
- Alexander Fraser, 1430–1471
- John Finlay, 1472–1480
- Hugh Fraser, x 1498
- Thomas Ramsay, 1498
- Dugald (Callus) McRory, 1498–1514
- Nicholas Brachane, 1525–1528
- James Haswell, 1528
- David Murray, 1528
- James de Baldoven, 1529–1531

== List of commendators ==
- Robert Reid, 1531–1553
- Walter Reid, ?1553–1572
- John Fraser, 1573–1579
- Thomas Fraser, 1579
- Adam Cuming, 1581–1607
- Alexander Douglas, 1606
- James Hay de Kingask, 1607–1612
- George Strang, 1612

== Bibliography ==
- Cowan, Ian B. & Easson, David E., Medieval Religious Houses: Scotland With an Appendix on the Houses in the Isle of Man, Second Edition, (London, 1976), p. 84
- Watt, D.E.R. & Shead, N.F. (eds.), The Heads of Religious Houses in Scotland from the 12th to the 16th Centuries, The Scottish Records Society, New Series, Volume 24, (Edinburgh, 2001), pp. 15–18

== See also ==
- Beauly Priory
