= Beauly Priory =

Monastery in Highland, Scotland

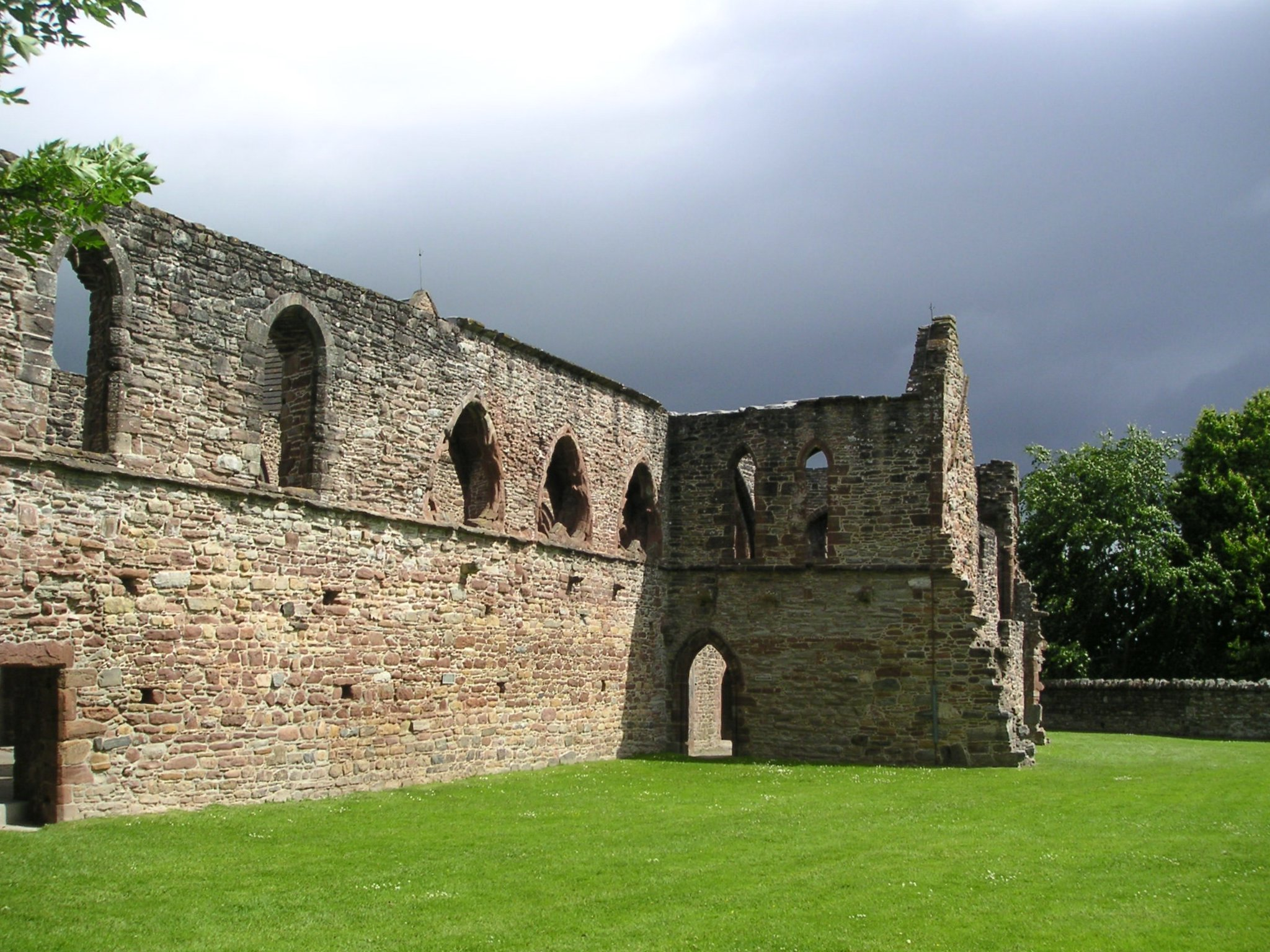
- Interactive map of Beauly Priory

Monastery information
- Order: Valliscaulian, Cistercian (after 1510)
- Established: 1230
- Disestablished: 1634
- Mother house: Val-des-Choux
- Diocese: Diocese of Moray
- Controlled churches: Abertarff; Comar; Conveth

People
- Founders: Alexander II of Scotland; John Byset
- Important associated figures: Robert Reid

Beauly Priory was a Valliscaulian monastic community located at "Insula de Achenbady", now Beauly, Inverness-shire. It was probably founded in 1230. It is not known for certain who the founder was, different sources giving Alexander II of Scotland, John Byset, and both. The French monks, along with Bisset (a nearby, recently settled landowner), had a strong enough French-speaking presence to give the location and the river the name "beau lieu" ("beautiful place") and have it pass into English.

It is not the best documented abbey, and few of the priors of Beauly are known by name until the 14th century. It became Cistercian on 16 April 1510, after the suppression of the Valliscaulian Order by the Pope. The priory was gradually secularised, and ruled by a series of commendatory abbots. The priory's lands were given over to the bishop of Ross by royal charter on 20 October 1634.

The ruins today are still extensive and are one of the main visitor attractions in Inverness-shire. It is protected as a scheduled monument.

== John Keats ==
In August 1818 John Keats and his friend Charles Brown stopped at Beauly on their way to Cromarty. Their visit produced a collaborative poem, On Some Skulls in Beauley Abbey, near Inverness, written early in August 1818 or possibly some weeks or months later. The majority of the lines are by Brown. Keats contributed to the first line of the poem and the first four words of the second line, and three stanzas.

== Notable burials ==
- Hugh Fraser, 3rd Lord Lovat was buried at Beauly Priory after he was killed at the Battle of the Shirts in 1544.
- Kenneth Mackenzie, 7th of Kintail who died in 1492 is buried at Beauly Priory and according to The Scots Peerage which was published in 1910, his tomb is still extant.
- John Mackenzie, 9th of Kintail who died in 1561 is buried in the Mackenzie's aisle at Beauly.
- Kenneth Mackenzie, 10th of Kintail who died on 6 June 1568, having fought at the Battle of Langside on 13 May 1568, was buried in the Mackenzie's aisle at Beauly.
- Colin Cam Mackenzie, 11th of Kintail who died in 1594 at Redcastle is buried at Beauly.
- Walter Ross, son of William Ross the provost of Tain, was buried at Beauly Priory after he died from wounds received at the Battle of Glen Affric in 1721.

== Gallery ==
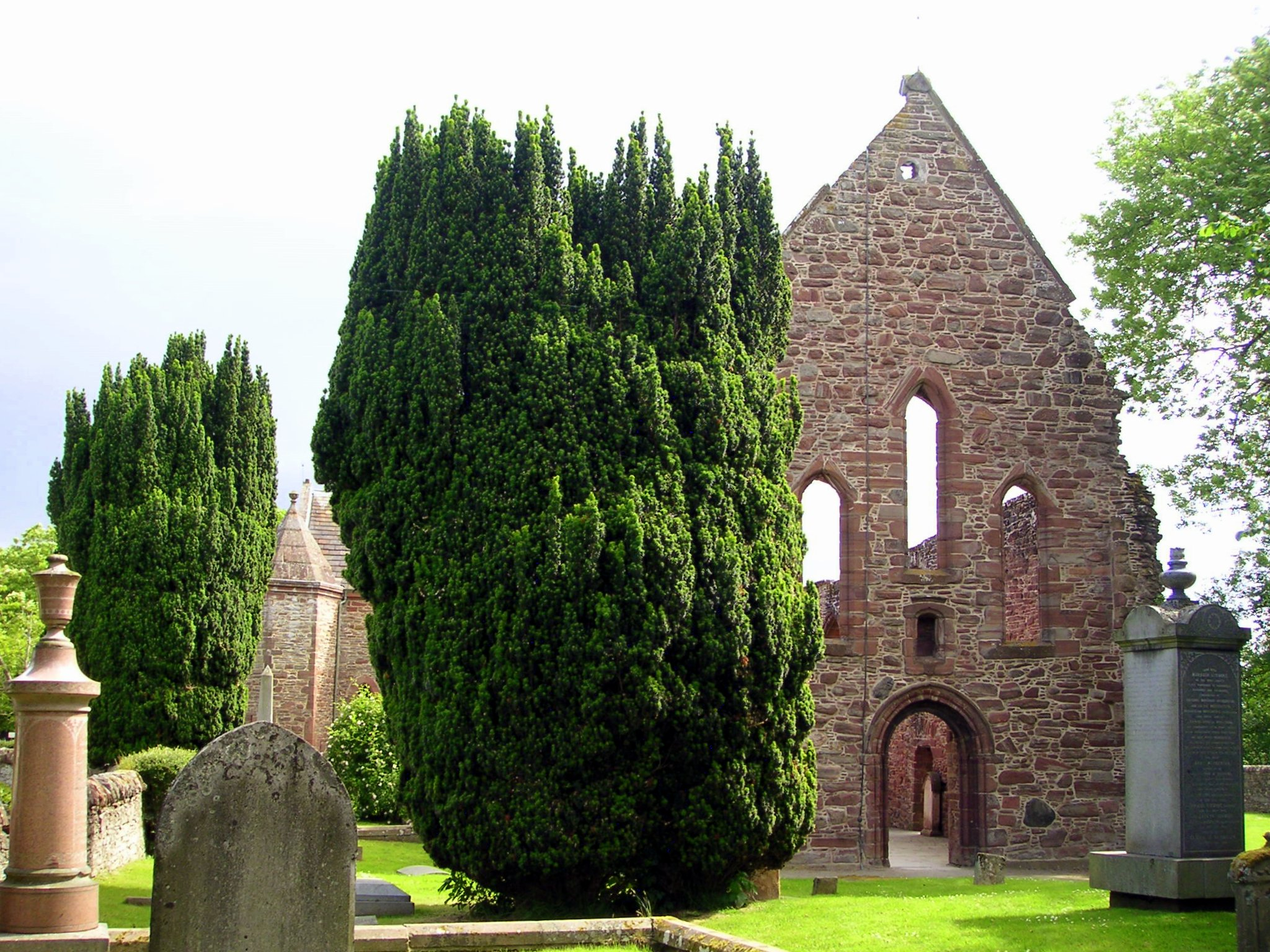
Beauly Priory facade

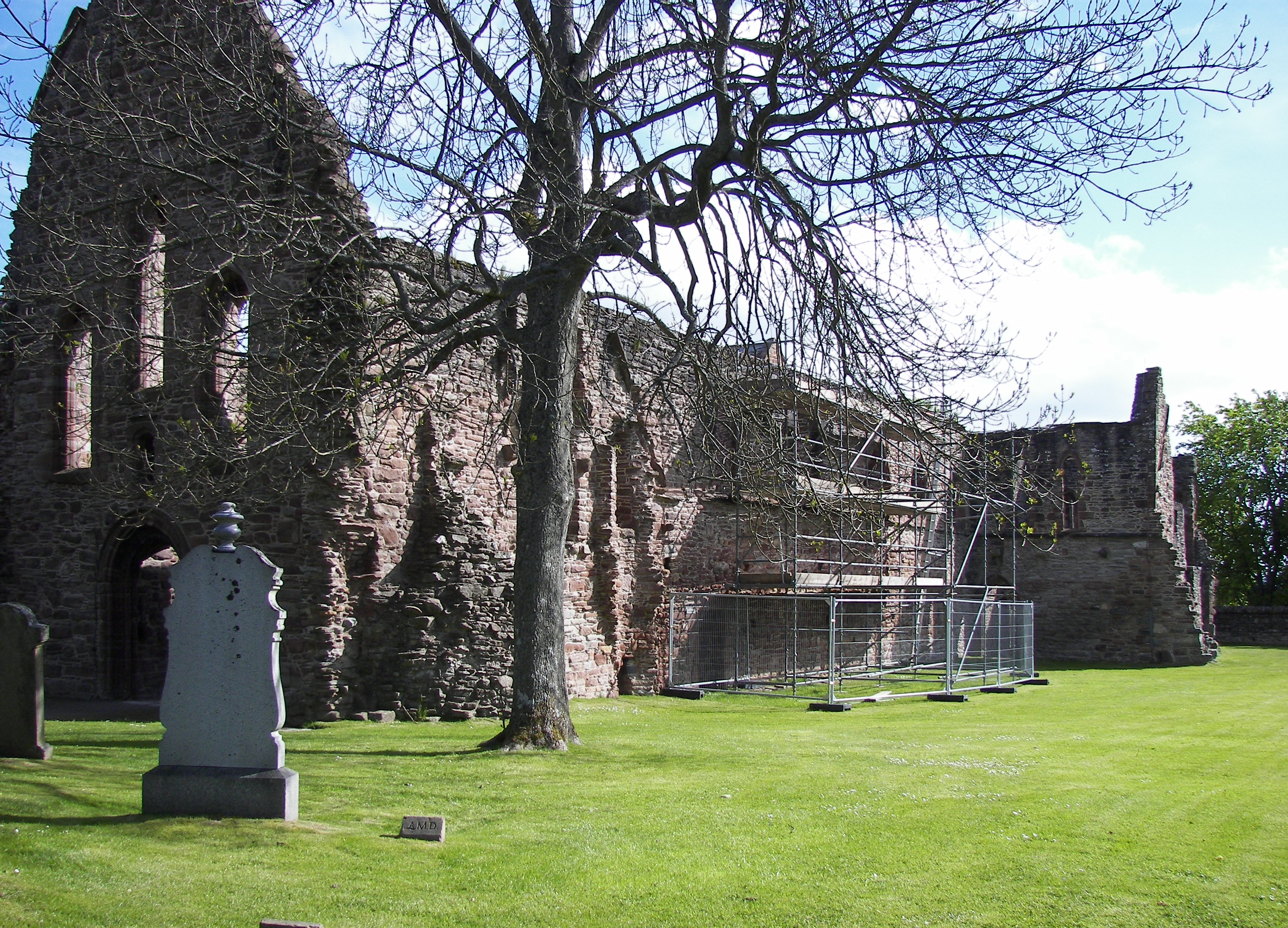

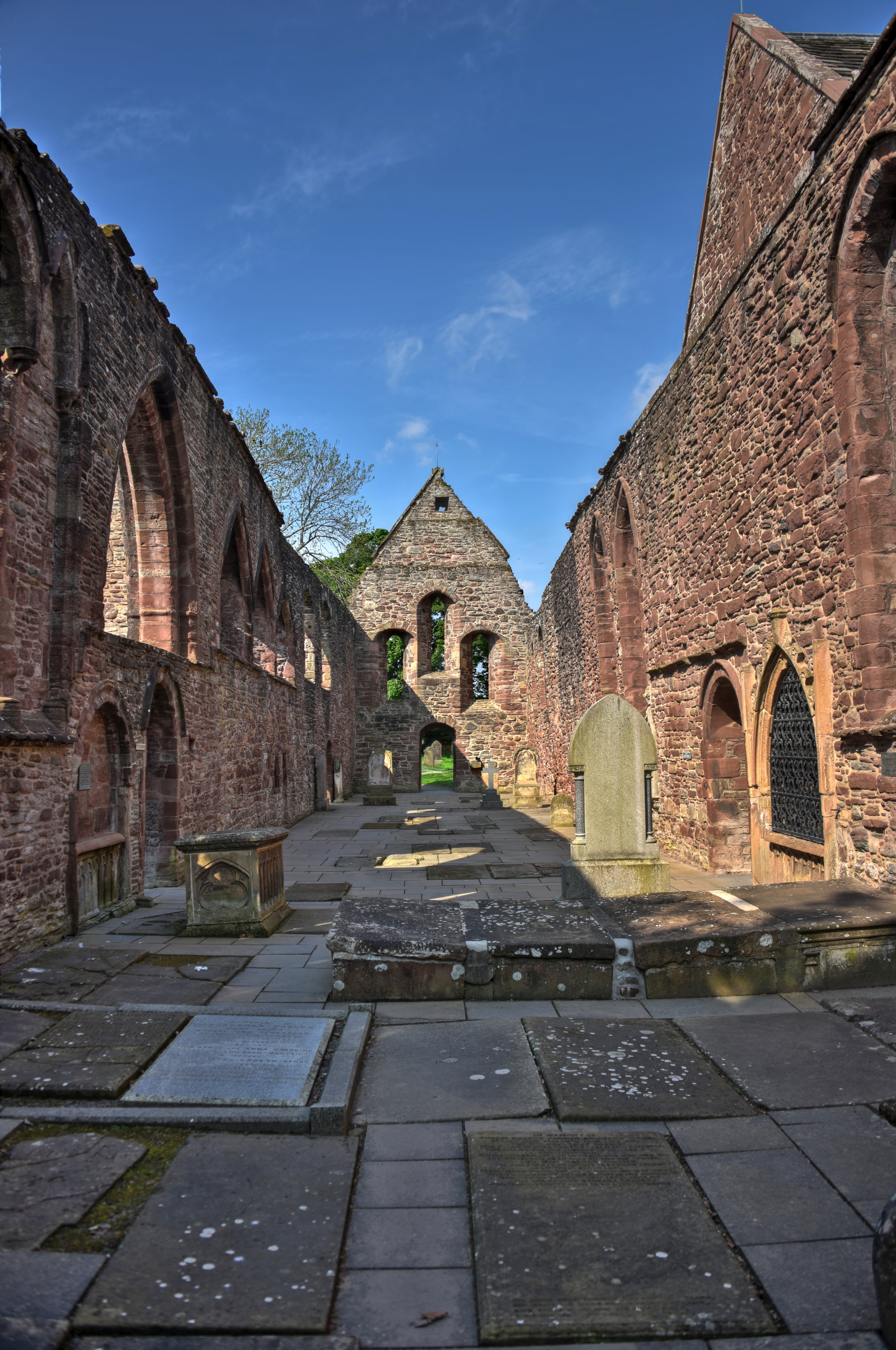

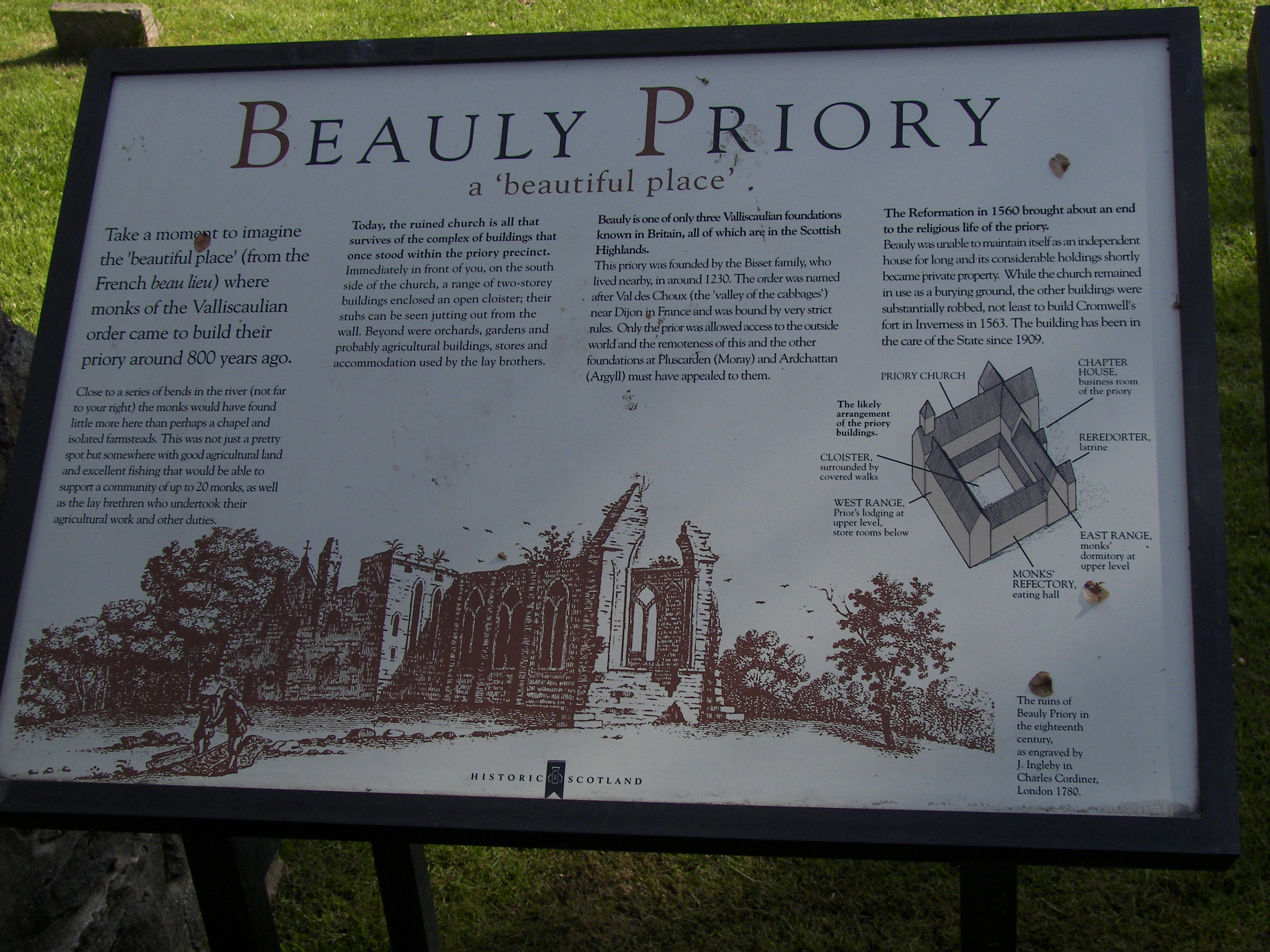
Sign outside

== See also ==
- Prior of Beauly

== Bibliography ==
- Chisholm-Batten, Edmund, The Charters of the Priory of Beauly with Notices of the Priories of Pluscardine and Ardchattan and of the Family of the Founder John Byset. London: Houlston & Sons. 1877. alt
- Cowan, Ian B. & Easson, David E., Medieval Religious Houses: Scotland With an Appendix on the Houses in the Isle of Man, Second Edition, (London, 1976), p. 84
- Watt, D.E.R. & Shead, N.F. (eds.), The Heads of Religious Houses in Scotland from the 12th to the 16th Centuries, The Scottish Records Society, New Series, Volume 24, (Edinburgh, 2001), pp. 15–18

George F Campbell: "The First and Lost Iona." Candlemas Hill Publishing 2006 and on Kindle.
