= Valliscaulian Order =

Coordinates: 47°46′17″N 4°45′14″E

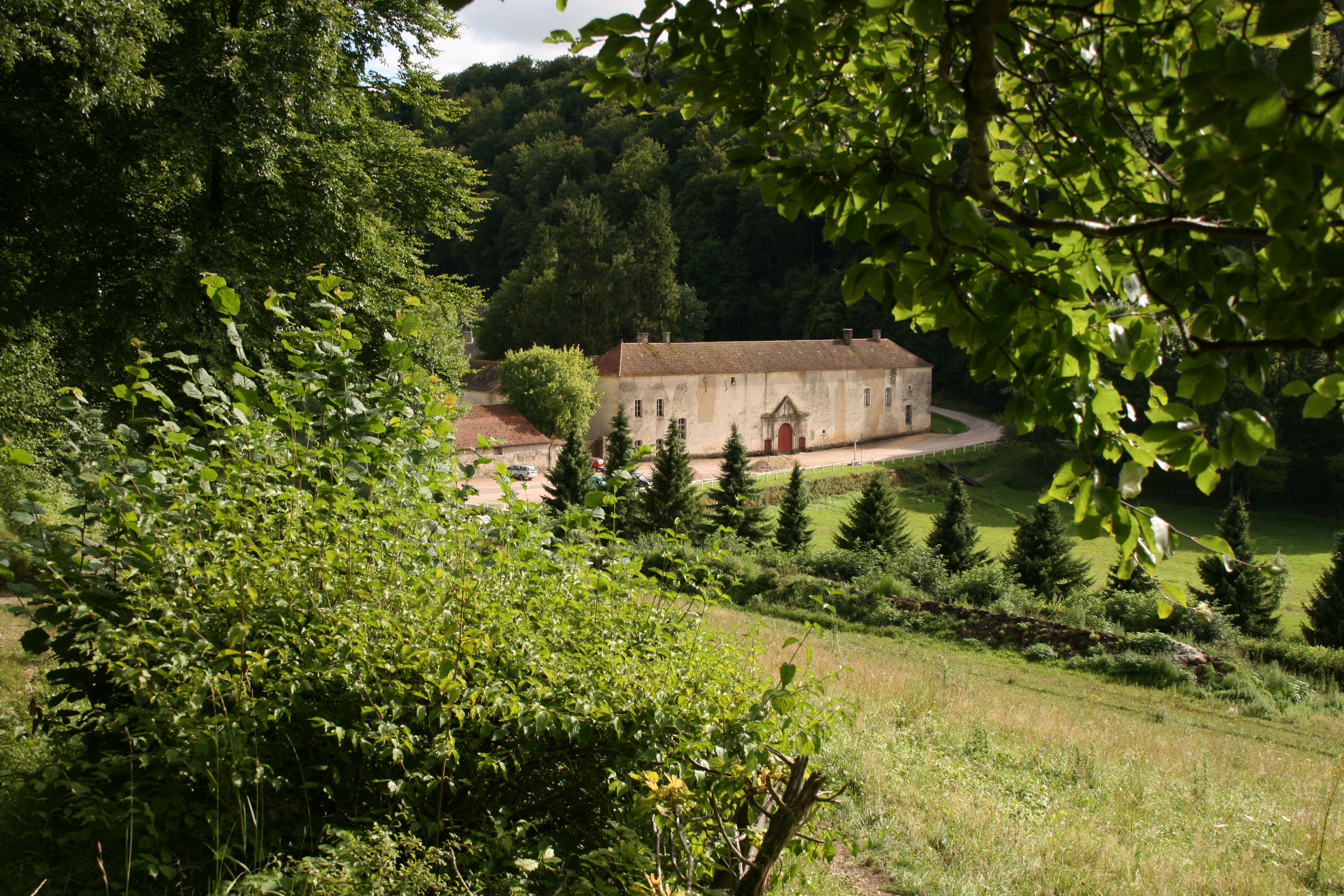
- Entrance to the Abbey of Val-des-Choux

Regions with significant populations
- Burgundy

Religions
- Roman Catholic

The Valliscaulian Order was a religious order of the Catholic Church. It was named after Vallis Caulium or Val-des-Choux, its first monastery, located in Burgundy. The order was founded at the end of the twelfth century and lasted until its absorption by the Cistercians in the eighteenth century.

== History ==
The order was founded towards the end of the twelfth century by Viard (also styled Gui), a lay brother of the Carthusian priory of Lugny, in the Diocese of Langres in Burgundy. Viard was permitted by his superior to lead the life of a hermit in a cavern in a wood, where he gained by his life of prayer and austerity the reputation of a saint. Odo (Eudes) III, Duke of Burgundy, in fulfilment of a vow made while on the Fourth Crusade, immediately upon inheriting his estates built a church and monastery on the site of the hermitage. Viard became prior in 1193, and framed rules for the new foundation drawn partly from the Carthusian and partly from the Cistercian observance. In 1203, for the benefit of his soul, of his father's and his predecessors' the Duke Eudes gave all the surrounding forest to the brothers. He made a further gift in 1209. The gifts were confirmed by a bull of Pope Innocent III, 10 May 1211.

The order was formally confirmed by Pope Innocent III, on 10 February 1205, in a rescript Protectio Apostolica, preserved in the Register of Moray, in connection with the House of Pluscardyn. Further endowments were made by the Duke's successors, by the Bishops of Langres, and other benefactors. The tomb of the Dukes of Burgundy, now removed to Dijon, was originally erected at Val-des-Choux; in bas-reliefs of a blind arcading of its base are the only representations of the monks of Val-de-Choux. Among the annual gifts of the Dukes were twenty hogsheads of Pommard wine.

The monks supported themselves in part by salt-making in large stone tubs, for which manufacture they claimed exemption from the tax levied on salt works. The collection of income due them involved the community in endless litigation.

By a Bull of Honorius III, 13 April 1223, the strict original rule established by Viard was relaxed somewhat.

According to the Catholic Encyclopedia, Pierre Hélyot states, that there were thirty dependent houses of the order, but only twenty are known by name. Seventeen of these were in France, the principal one being at Val-Croissant, in the Diocese of Autun; and the remaining three in Scotland. [see Beauly priory]. Two local granges are recorded. All houses of the order were priories; references in the statues of 1268 and elsewhere show that priories of the order existed also in Germany.

A complete list of the priors-general has been preserved, from the founder Viard, who died after 1213, to Dorothée Jallontz, who was also abbot of the Cistercian house of Sept-Fons, and was the last grand-prior of Val-des-Choux before the absorption of the Valliscaulian brotherhood into the Cistercian Order.

In the middle of the eighteenth century there were but three brothers of the mother-house; the revenues had greatly diminished, and there had been no profession in the order for twenty-four years. Gilbert, Bishop of Langres, strongly urged the remaining members to unite with the Cistercians, whose rule they had originally, in great part, adopted. The proposal was agreed to, the change was authorized by a Papal Bull of Clement XIII in 1761, and Val-des-Choux was formally incorporated with Sept-Fons in March 1764, the parlement of Burgundy having ratified the arrangement. For the next quarter of a century the monastery flourished under its new conditions; but it was swept away in the French Revolution with the other religious houses of France.

Of the three Scottish houses of the order, Ardchattan, Beauly and Pluscarden, the first two became Cistercian priories, and the third a cell of the Benedictine Abbey of Dunfermline, a century before the dissolution of the monasteries in Scotland.

== The Valliscaulian Rule ==
According to Hippolyte Hélyot, the rule of the Valliscaulians, unlike that of the Augustinians, was centered on the personal salvation of the monks, not of the world at large. The monks were housed in very small cells, to which they could withdraw in order to be alone with God at times of prayer, study, and meditation. They surrendered all their possessions in order to avoid distractions from their spiritual exercises, which meant that they did not keep oxen or sheep or engage in cultivation of crops. They received small incomes, enough to supply the necessities of life and prevent the need for begging or outside employment. The admission of new monks was limited by the financial resources needed to sustain them. They wore the white mantle and the red cross of the Cistercians.

A more complete survey of the Valliscaulian rule is found in the Bull of Pope Innocent III, which is recorded in the Register of Moray. Some of its main features are the following:

- "None of you are to possess any separate property.
- "In assembling every day, the mass and the canonical hours shall be sung. . . .
- "You shall hold a chapter every day, making twelve readings at the appointed times.
- "You shall work together, and you shall eat together in the refectory, not using flesh or fat (sagimine)….
- "You shall live on your revenues (redditibus).
- "You shall observe silence. Women shall not enter the inner bounds, nor shall you pass the outer bounds, except the prior on the business of the order….
- "You shall wear hair-shirts next your skins; those, however, who cannot endure these are not to be compelled to do so. You are on no account to put on linen or hempen garments, but to clothe yourselves in white dresses of coarse wool and fur (pelliceas). You shall all lie down in your tunics, with your girdles [belts] on, and shoes on. And besides this, you, my sons the monks, with your cowls on, nowhere and never resting upon mattresses.
- "Your novices shall be in probation for a year.
- "And you, my sons, the monks, from matins to the hour of labour, and from vespers to sunset, shall devote yourselves to reading, prayer, and contemplation [unless exempted with the permission of the prior]."

== See also ==
- Christian monasticism
- Rule of St. Benedict
