= Cambuskenneth =

Coordinates: 56.123°N 3.919°W

Cambuskenneth: Scottish Gaelic: Camas Choinnich; Scots: Cammuskenneth
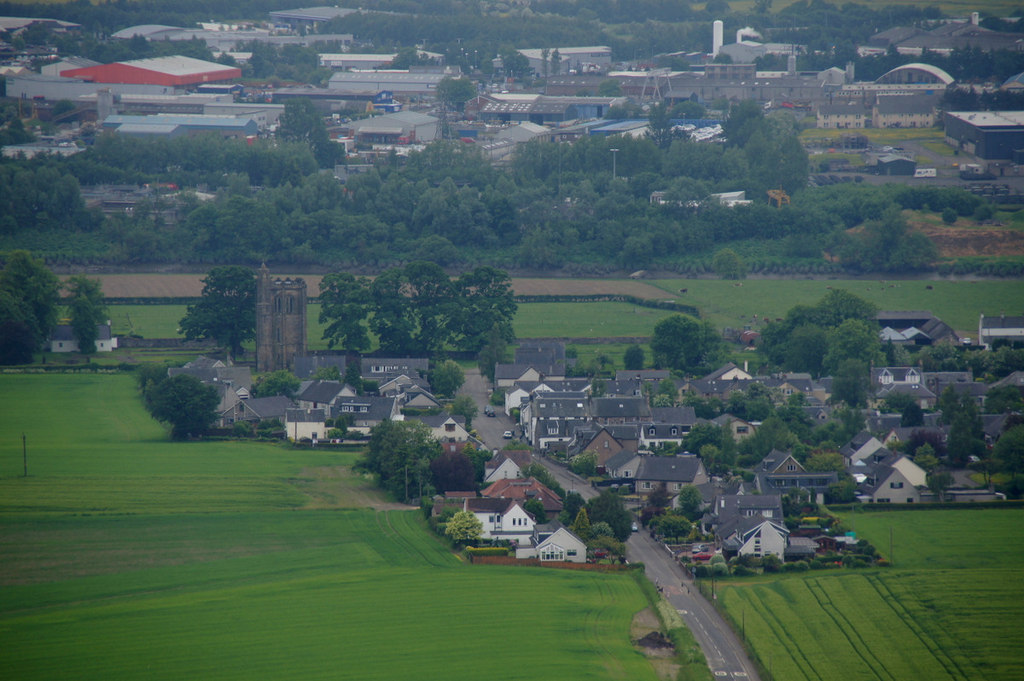
- An aerial view of Cambuskenneth

- Location within the Stirling council area
- Population: 250
- OS grid reference: NS807939
- Civil parish: Stirling
- Council area: Stirling
- Lieutenancy area: Stirling and Falkirk
- Country: Scotland
- Sovereign state: United Kingdom
- Post town: Stirling
- Postcode district: FK9
- Dialling code: 01786
- Police: Scotland
- Fire: Scottish
- Ambulance: Scottish
- UK Parliament: Stirling and Strathallan
- Scottish Parliament: Stirling
- Website: cambuskenneth.info

Cambuskenneth (Scottish Gaelic: Camas Choinnich [ˈkʰaməs̪ ˈxɤɲɪç]) is a village in the city of Stirling, Scotland. It has a population of 250 and is the site of the historic Cambuskenneth Abbey. It is situated by the River Forth and the only road access to the village is along Ladysneuk Road from Alloa Road in Causewayhead. In 1935 a footbridge was constructed across the river to the neighbouring district of Riverside. Prior to then, the access to Stirling was by ferry.

The village is on the site of an old orchard. The village public house, the Abbey Inn was on the corner of North Street and closed in 2016. Beside the footbridge is the village hall, which is the meeting place for the community council, and across from that the park, which has a children's play area and a small football pitch.

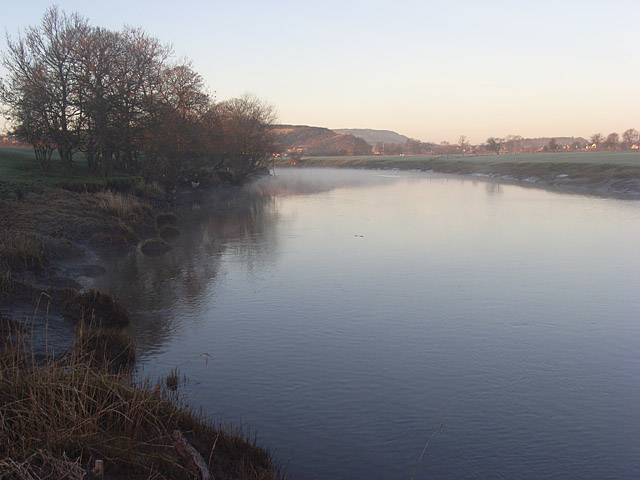
The River Forth by Cambuskenneth
