= David Panter =

Scottish diplomat, clerk and bishop of Ross

- Bishop of Ross
- Church: Roman Catholic Church
- See: Diocese of Ross
- In office: 1545–1558
- Predecessor: Robert Cairncross
- Successor: Henry Sinclair
- Previous posts: Coadjutor of Cambuskenneth (1534–1549); Commendator of St Mary's Isle (1536–1547); Commendator of Cambuskenneth (1549–1558)

Orders
- Consecration: 1552

Personal details
- Born: unknown unknown
- Died: 1 October 1558 Stirling, Scotland

David Panter (also written Paniter, or Painter (died 1 October 1558) was a Scottish diplomat, clerk, and bishop of Ross.

== Family background ==
He was the illegitimate son of Patrick Panter, secretary to James IV; his mother was Margaret Crichton, illegitimate daughter of William Crichton, 3rd Lord Crichton and widow countess of Rothes. He and his sister were legitimised on 13 August 1513. He was a university graduate, probably at the University of St. Andrews.

== Career ==
On 8 April 1536, he received crown nomination to the papacy for provision to become commendator St Mary's Isle in Galloway; in 1549 he became successor to Alexander Mylne as commendator of the abbey of Cambuskenneth, for which he had been coadjutor (designated successor) since 7 August 1534. On 23 December 1545, he obtained a crown provision to the abbey of Fearn, though that was unsuccessful.

Employed by Mary of Guise, he was in France in February 1542 on some unknown errand, and on 31 March 1544, was sent thither with Sir John Campbell of Lundie on a mission to the French king. He returned in June with John Hamilton, abbot of Paisley, in time to assist Cardinal Beaton's opposition to the English matrimonial schemes of the English court. In 1543 he became secretary to James V.

The letters of the English ambassadors, preserved in Sadler's Papers, and George Buchanan's bitter criticism testify to the strength of his influence on behalf of France. In December he was ordered by the governor to deliver back, according to custom, the badge of knighthood of the Golden Fleece to the Emperor Charles V.

In 1545 he became bishop of Ross, and in May of that year was sent on a mission to the king of France, the Emperor, and Mary of Hungary. He was abroad for seven years. On his return, in 1552, he received consecration to his bishopric at Jedburgh, before a brilliant assembly of the Scottish nobles. He died, according to Holinshed, at Stirling on 1 October 1558, and was succeeded in the bishopric by Henry Sinclair. On 1 October 1558, Mary of Guise sent the Dingwall Pursuivant to Cambuskenneth to seize his belongings. His goods were forfeit to the crown on account of his illegitimacy.

== Notes ==
Attribution

This article incorporates text from a publication now in the public domain: "Panter, David". Dictionary of National Biography. London: Smith, Elder & Co. 1885–1900.

Religious titles
Preceded by John Douglas	Commendator of St Mary's Isle; 1536–1547	Succeeded by Robert Stirling
Preceded by Alexander Mylne	Commendator of Cambuskenneth; 1549–1558	Succeeded by Not known next known commendator: Adam Erskine
Preceded by Robert Cairncross	Bishop of Ross; 1450–1458	Succeeded by Henry Sinclair
