= Hippolyte Hélyot =

Hippolyte Hélyot (January 1660 – 5 January 1716) was a Franciscan friar and priest of the Franciscan Third Order Regular and a major scholar of church history, focusing on the history of the religious Orders.

== Biography ==
Hélyot was born at Paris in January 1660, supposedly of English ancestry, and christened Pierre at his birth. After spending his youth in study, he entered, in his twenty-fourth year, the friary of the Third Order Regular of St. Francis, founded in Picpus – now part of Paris – by his uncle, Jérôme Hélyot, a canon regular of the Order of the Holy Sepulcher. There he took the religious name under which he gained his reputation as a historian.

Two journeys to Rome on business of the Order afforded him the opportunity of traveling over most of Italy; and after his final return he saw much of France, while acting as secretary to various provincial superiors of his Order. Both in Italy and France he was engaged in collecting materials for his great work, which occupied him for about twenty-five years. It was titled L'Histoire des ordres monastiques, religieux et militaires, et des congregations séculières de l'un et de l'autre sexe, qui ont été établis jusqu'à présent (The History of the Religious and Military Monastic Orders, and of the Secular Congregations of both Sexes, which have been established up to the Present Day). L'Histoire was published in eight volumes between 1714 and 1719. Jean-Baptiste Coignard of Paris printed the first two volumes for Joseph Derbais of Douay; Coignard published the remaining six volumes under his own name.

Hélyot died on 5 January 1716, before the fifth volume appeared, but his friend and colleague, Friar Maximilien Bullot, T.O.R., completed the fifth volume and authored the remaining three volumes. Hélyot's other noteworthy work is Le Chrétien mourant (1695).

== Works ==
His History is a work of first importance, being the great repository of information regarding the general history of the religious orders up to the end of the 17th century. Hélyot gave detailed information about the foundation – and, where appropriate, the decline – of the various groups. It is profusely illustrated by large plates exhibiting the religious habits of the various Orders, and in the edition of 1792 the plates are colored. It was translated into Italian (1737) and into German (1753). The material was arranged in an alphabetical dictionary form by M. L. Badiche, for inclusion in Migne's Encyclopédie théologique, under the title "Dictionnaire des ordres religieux" (5 vols., 1858).
