= College of Justice =

Supreme courts of Scotland

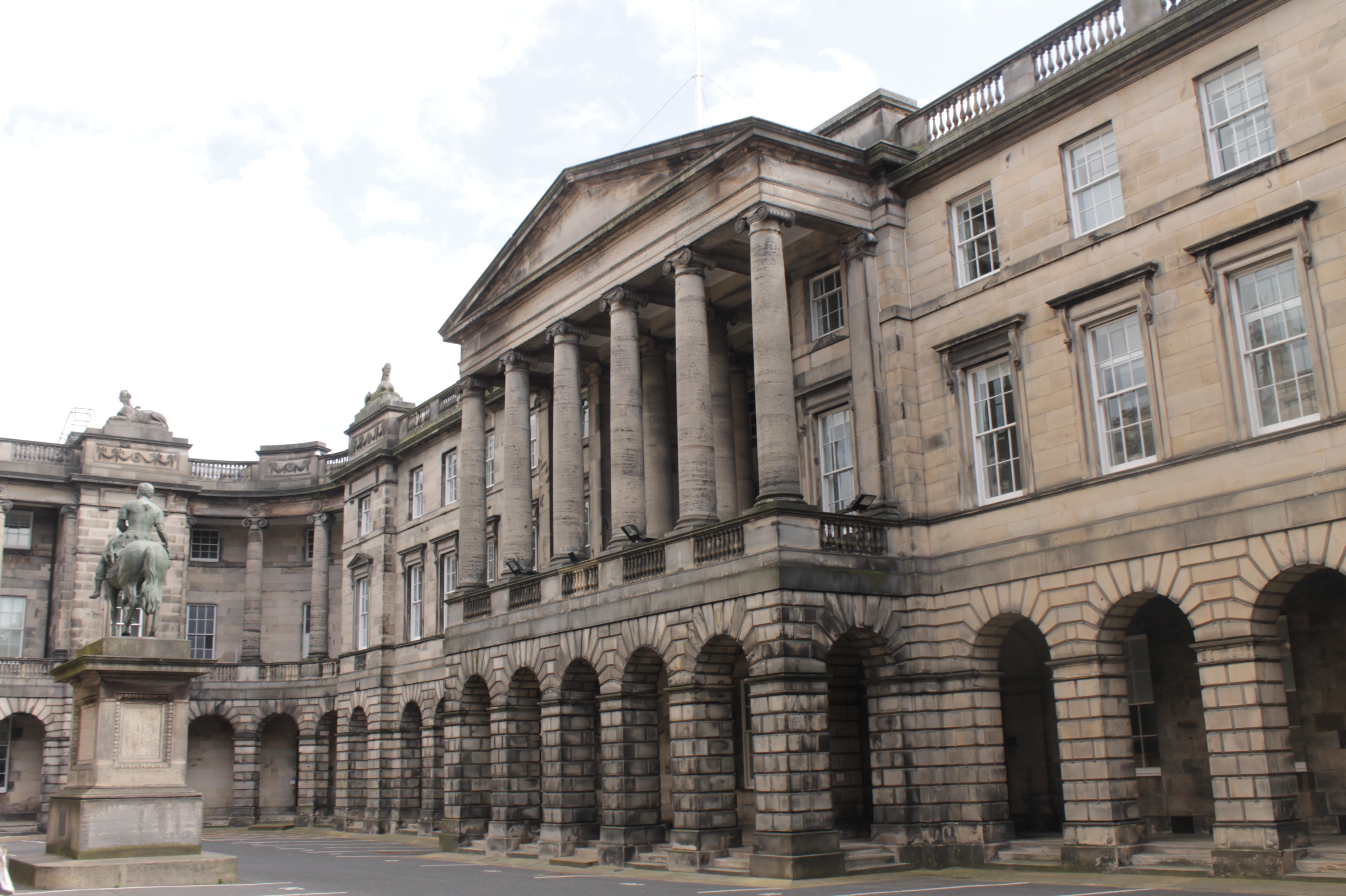
- Scottish version of the Royal Coat of Arms as used by the Courts in Scotland The Court of Session, the supreme civil court, is based at Parliament House
- Established: 1532
- Jurisdiction: Scotland
- Location: Parliament House, Edinburgh
- Composition method: The Monarch on the recommendation of the First Minister, who receives recommendations from the Judicial Appointments Board for Scotland
- Appeals to: Supreme Court of the United Kingdom (criminal cases appealed from the High Court of Scotland are limited to appeals on points of law with respect to human rights and devolution issues only.)
- Judge term length: Mandatory retirement at age 75

Lord President and Lord Justice General
- Currently: Lord Pentland
- Since: 2025

Lord Justice Clerk and President of the Second Division of the Inner House
- Currently: Lord Beckett
- Since: 2025

The College of Justice (Scottish Gaelic: Colaiste a' Cheartais) includes the Supreme Courts of Scotland, and its associated bodies. The constituent bodies of the national supreme courts are the Court of Session, the High Court of Justiciary, the Office of the Accountant of Court, and the Auditor of the Court of Session. Its associated bodies are the Faculty of Advocates, the Society of Writers to His Majesty's Signet and the Society of Solicitors in the Supreme Courts of Scotland.

The college is headed by the Lord President of the Court of Session, who also holds the title of Lord Justice General in relation to the High Court of Justiciary, and judges of the Court of Session and High Court are titled Senators of the College of Justice.

== History ==
The college was founded in 1532 by King James V following a bull issued by Pope Clement VII on 15 September 1531. It provided for 10,000 gold ducats to be contributed by the Scottish bishoprics and monastic institutions for the maintenance of its members, one half of whom would be members of the "ecclesiastical dignity".

College of Justice Act 1532
- Act of Parliament
- Parliament of Scotland
- Long title: Concerning the ordour of Justice and the institutioun of ane college of cunning and wise men for the administracioun of Justice.
- Citation: 1532 c. 2 [12mo ed: 1537 cc. 36–41]

Dates
- Royal assent: 17 May 1532
Other legislation
Amended by	Statute Law Revision (Scotland) Act 1906

Status: Amended

Text of the College of Justice Act 1532 as in force today (including any amendments) within the United Kingdom, from legislation.gov.uk.

The Parliament of Scotland passed the College of Justice Act 1532 (c. 2 (S)) on 17 May 1532 authorising the creation of the college with 14 members, half spiritual, half temporal, plus a president and the Lord Chancellor. The college convened for the first time on 27 May 1532, in the royal presence. Supplementing the 14 ordinary lords, who were called senators, were an indefinite number of supernumerary judges called extraordinary lords.

The founding members of the College of Justice were:

- The Lord Chancellor, Gavin Dunbar, Archbishop of Glasgow
- The Lord President, Alexander Myln, Abbot of Cambuskenneth
- Richard Bothwell, Rector of Ashkirk
- John Dingwall, Provost of Trinity College
- Henry White, Rector of Finevin
- William Gibson, Dean of Restalrig
- Thomas Hay, Dean of Dunbar
- Robert Reid, Abbot of Kinloss
- George Ker, Provost of Dunglass
- Sir William Scott of Balweary
- Henry Lauder, Lord St Germains, Lord Advocate
- John Campbell of Lundy
- Sir James Colville of Easter Wemyss
- Sir Adam Otterburn of Auldhame and Redhall, Lord Advocate
- Nicholas Crawford of Oxengangs
- Francis Bothwell of Edinburgh (brother of Richard)
- James Lawson of Edinburgh
- Sir James Foulis of Colinton, who was added at the first meeting of the court when the king made him a "Lord of the Session".

The college at its foundation dealt with underdeveloped civil law. It did not dispense justice in criminal matters as that was an area of the law reserved to the king's justice, through the justiciars (hence the High Court of the Justiciary), the Barony Courts and the Commission of Justiciary. The High Court of Justiciary was only incorporated into the College of Justice in 1672. Initially, there was little legal literature. Acts of the Parliament of Scotland and the books of the Old Law as well as Roman Law and canon law texts were about all to which the pursuer and defender could refer. It was only after the establishment of the court that this situation improved, with judges noting their decisions in books of practicks.

The Treaty of Union 1707 with England preserved the Scottish Legal System. Article XIX provided "that the Court of Session or College of Justice do after the Union and notwithstanding thereof remain in all time coming within Scotland, and that the Court of Justiciary do also after the Union ... remain in all time coming."

== Supreme Courts of Scotland ==
=== Court of Session ===
The Court of Session is the highest national court of Scotland in relation to civil cases. The court was established in 1532 to take on the judicial functions of the royal council. Its jurisdiction overlapped with other royal, state and church courts but as those were disbanded, the role of the Court of Session ascended. The Acts of Union establishing the United Kingdom provided that the court will "remain in all time coming". Cases at first instance are heard in the Outer House by a single judge. The Inner House hears appeals from the Outer House and all other courts and tribunals in Scotland. Only Scottish advocates and solicitor-advocates may argue cases before the court. The Court of Session has sat at Parliament House since 1707. The Scottish Courts and Tribunals Service and the Principal Clerk administers the court and judges.

The creation of the court was part of wider efforts to improve and reform access to justice in Scottish society. By 1153, the local feudal courts had been established. Depending on the part of Scotland where the cause originated, justice might also be available from the local baron or lord of regality, sitting with the king's authority. Parties often found these courts ineffectual. Appeal of the decisions of local courts lay to the king and the Lords of Council, sitting together as the King's Council, or the Parliament of Scotland. The burden on these bodies of hearing appeals led to a growing effort to divest their judicial functions.

=== High Court of Justiciary ===
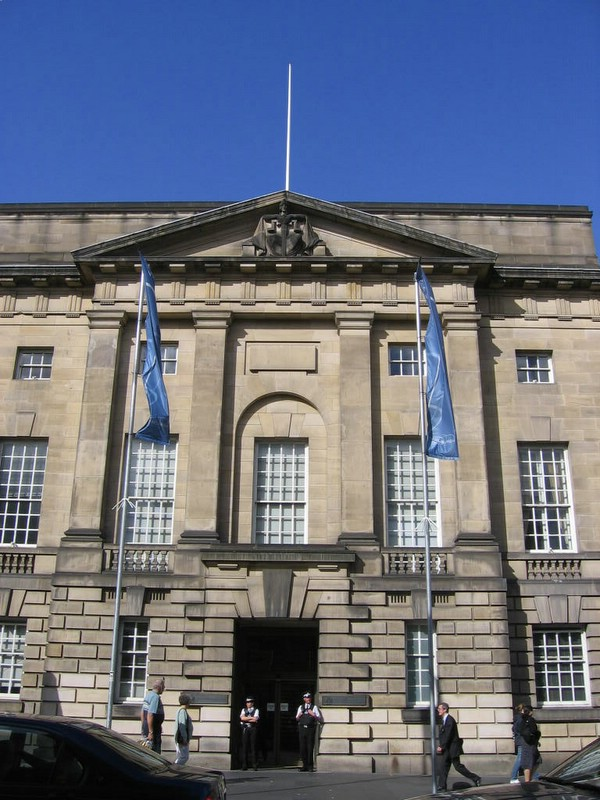
The High Court of Justiciary, the supreme criminal court, in Edinburgh

The High Court of Justiciary is the supreme criminal court in Scotland. The High Court is both a trial court and a court of appeal. As a trial court, the High Court sits on circuit at Parliament House or in the adjacent former Sheriff Court building in the Old Town in Edinburgh, or in dedicated buildings in Glasgow and Aberdeen. The High Court sometimes sits in various smaller towns in Scotland, where it uses the local sheriff court building. As an appeal court, the High Court sits only in Edinburgh. On one occasion the High Court of Justiciary sat outside Scotland, at Zeist in the Netherlands during the Pan Am Flight 103 bombing trial, as the Scottish Court in the Netherlands. At Zeist the High Court sat both as a trial court, and an appeal court for the initial appeal by Abdelbaset al-Megrahi. The High Court will hear appeals from the sheriff courts of Scotland where the trial was under solemn proceedings; the High Court will also hear referrals on points of law from the Sheriff Appeal Court, and from summary proceedings in the sheriff courts and justice of the peace courts. Cases can be remitted to the High Court by the sheriff courts after conviction for sentencing, where a sheriff believes that their sentencing powers are inadequate. The High Court can impose a life sentence but the sheriff has a limit of five years sentencing; both can issue an unlimited fine.

The origins derive from the Justiciar and College of Justice, as well as from the medieval royal courts and barony courts. The medieval Justiciar (royal judge) took its name from the justices who originally travelled around Scotland hearing cases on circuit or 'ayre'. From 1524, the Justiciar or a depute was required to have a "permanent base" in Edinburgh.

The King of Scots sometimes sat in judgment of cases in the early King's Court, and it appears that appeals could be taken from the King's Court to the Parliament of Scotland in civil cases but not in criminal ones. In 1532 the College of Justice was founded, separating civil and criminal jurisdiction between two distinct courts. The King's Court was, however, normally the responsibility of the Justiciar. The Justiciar normally appointed several deputes to assist in the administration of justice, and to preside in his absence. A legally qualified clerk advised the Justiciar and his deputes as they were generally noblemen and often not legally qualified. This clerk prepared all the indictments and was keeper of the records. Eventually the influence of the clerk increased until the clerk gained both a vote in the court, and a seat on the bench as the Justice-Clerk.

=== Office of the Accountant of Court ===
The Office of the Accountant of Court is a public body which is a constituent part of the Supreme Courts of Scotland. The Accountant of Court is administered by the Scottish Courts and Tribunals Service. The Accountant of Court's Office formerly dealt with guardianship cases in respect of adults with incapacity. However, following the introduction of the Adults with Incapacity (Scotland) Act 2000 by the Scottish Parliament, these cases were transferred to the new Office of the Public Guardian (Scotland). Based in Falkirk, the office of Accountant of Court, also known as the Accountant of the Court of Session (see Court of Session), was established by the Judicial Factors Act 1849, and their role was further defined by the Children (Scotland) Act 1995.

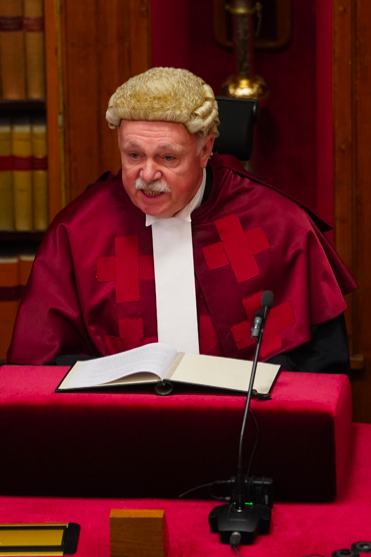
Lord Pentland, the incumbent presiding judge of the College of Justice

The Accountant of Court is responsible for ensuring that those appointed by the Courts as Judicial Factor in terms of the Judicial Factors Act 1849 manage the estates in their charge properly. The Accountant of Court will generally superintend the actions of a Judicial Factor and provide them with the necessary guidance and direction required progress a case. In addition the Accountant of Court is also responsible for investigating any concerns or complaints that are raised against a Judicial Factor.

The Accountant of Court is also responsible for supervising Enforcement Administrators appointed by the Courts to recover assets confiscated in terms of the Proceeds of Crime (Scotland) Act 1995.

== Senators ==
The Senators of the College of Justice are judges of the College of Justice, with three types different types of senator – Lords of Session (judges of the Court of Session); Lords Commissioners of Justiciary (judges of the High Court of Justiciary); and the Chairman of the Scottish Land Court. Whilst the High Court and Court of Session historically maintained separate judiciary, these are now identical, and the term senator is almost exclusively used in referring to the judges of these courts. On occasions, temporary judges may be appointed to sit in the Supreme Courts of Scotland in order to carry out the same work as permanent senators but will carry out their duties on a part-time basis, and as a result, are referred to as "Judge" rather than Lord or Lady.

The Court of Session has in place "special provisions" allowing it to deal with commercial actions which would ensure that specialist judges handle cases quickly and flexibly. The current commercial judges are Lord Tyre, Lord Clark, Lord Braid and Lord Ericht.

== See also ==
- Scots law
- Courts of Scotland
- Extraordinary Lord of Session
- Historic List of Senators of the College of Justice
- Principal Clerk of Session and Justiciary
- Senator of the College of Justice
