= Scottish Courts and Tribunals Service =

Independent public body

- Scottish Gaelic: Seirbheis Chùirte na h-Alba

Agency overview
- Formed: 1995; 31 years ago
- Type: Non-ministerial government department
- Jurisdiction: Scotland
- Headquarters: Saughton House, Broomhouse Drive, Edinburgh EH11 3XD
- Employees: 1,825 (2023/24)
- Annual budget: £129.3 million (2015-2016)
- Agency executives: Lord Carloway, Chairman; Eric McQueen, Chief Executive
- Child agencies: Judicial Office for Scotland; Office of the Public Guardian; Office of the Accountant of Court
- Website: www.scotcourts.gov.uk

Map
- Scotland in the UK and Europe

The Scottish Courts and Tribunals Service (SCTS) (Scottish Gaelic: Seirbheis Chùirte na h-Alba) is an independent public body which is responsible for the administration of the courts and tribunals of Scotland. The Service is led by a board which is chaired by the Lord President of the Court of Session, and employs over 1000 staff members in the country's 39 sheriff courts, 34 justice of the peace courts, the Court of Session and the High Court of Justiciary, and at the service's headquarters in Edinburgh. The day-to-day administration of the service is the responsibility of its chief executive and executive directors. The Scottish Courts and Tribunals Service is also responsible for providing administrative services for the Judicial Office for Scotland, the Office of the Public Guardian, the Accountant of Court, the Criminal Courts Rules Council, and the Scottish Civil Justice Council.

== History ==
The Service was first established as the Scottish Courts Administration in 1995, as an executive agency of the Scottish Office. It was later renamed Scottish Court Service. In 1999, the Service became an agency of the Scottish Government after responsibility of the courts and judiciary of Scotland were transferred under devolution. In common with the Scottish Prison Service in the Scottish justice system, this arm's length approach was adopted to prevent direct ministerial involvement in the administration of justice.

On 1 April 2010 it was re-established by section 60 of the Judiciary and Courts (Scotland) Act 2008 as an independent body corporate governed by a Corporate Board and chaired by the Lord President, the head of the Scottish judiciary.

On 1 April 2015, under the Courts Reform (Scotland) Act 2014, the Scottish Courts and Tribunals Service assumed the responsibilities of the former Scottish Court Service and Scottish Tribunals Service.

Security and maintenance of SCTS buildings are provided by Servest who are a company that provides multi functions in building management.

On 3 April 2018, the Glasgow Tribunals Centre opened to the public. The building houses all Tribunal teams based in Glasgow alongside Glasgow based teams of His Majesty's Courts and Tribunals Service. The building also contains bespoke hearing suites for His Majesty's Courts and Tribunals Service and The Scottish Courts and Tribunal Service.

== Functions ==
The Criminal Proceedings etc. (Reform) (Scotland) Act 2007 resulted in the unification of the administration of the Court of Session, the High Court of Justiciary, Sheriff and Justice of the Peace courts. The Scottish Courts and Tribunals Service has the function of providing, or ensuring the provision of, the property, services, officers and other staff required for the purposes of all these courts (by virtue of section 61(1) of the 2008 Act).

It has the responsibility of assisting the Scottish judiciary (by virtue of section 61(1)(b) of the 2008 Act), and assists the Lord President in his role as head of the Scottish judiciary (section 62 of the 2008 Act). This is coupled with assisting the Criminal Courts Rules Council and the Scottish Civil Justice Council.

The Service is also responsible for the administration of the Office of the Public Guardian, based in Falkirk, and assists the Accountant of Court (sections 62 and 33 of the 2008 Act).

Another consequence of the Act was the introduction of Fines Enforcement Officers. With effect from 10 March 2008 these officers, staff of SCS, will bring a more proactive approach to fines enforcement. A total of 31 members of staff will have responsibility for making sure that fines are paid on time and if offenders fall into arrears with payment those staff will use a variety of means to secure payment. Special measures that may be used will include deductions from state benefits; arrestment of wages and/or funds contained in bank accounts and seizure (and subsequent sale) of vehicles. In cases where it becomes apparent that the offender genuinely cannot pay they will be provided with contact details for other Agencies that will be able to provide guidance and help in organising the offender's finances.

== Leadership and administration ==
=== Board ===
The membership of the corporate Board of the Scottish Courts and Tribunals Service is determined by Schedule 3 of the Judiciary and Courts (Scotland) Act 2008, which stipulates that the following are members, ex officio:

- Lord President (judicial member)
- Lord Justice Clerk (judicial member)
- President of the Scottish Tribunals (judicial member)
- Chief Executive of the Service

There are a further 5 judicial members, appointed by the Lord President to a maximum term of 4 years:

- One sheriff principal
- Two sheriffs
- One justice of the peace
- One Chamber President in the First-tier Tribunal for Scotland

There are then 2 members of the legal profession, and 3 members from outside the legal system:

- One Advocate
- One Law Society of Scotland
- Three lay members.

The first Scottish Court Service Board was appointed by the Lord President on 18 December 2009 and comprises a majority of judicial officeholders and legal practitioners, by virtue of Schedule 3 to the 2008 Act. The Board formally took up responsibility on 1 April 2010 and is responsible for developing the strategic direction and operational efficiency of the Service. In September 2012, the Board put forward a document for "consultation" that, if approved, would render it in breach of its statutory duty as covered by Section 61(2) of the Judiciary and Courts (Scotland) Act 2008.

The response of the Scottish ministers is awaited.

=== Members of the Board ===
As of 23 April 2017 the members of the Scottish Courts and Tribunals Service Board were:

Scottish Courts and Tribunals Service board
Name	Category	Appointed	Other information
Lord Carloway	Lord President	ex officio	Chairman of the Board
Lady Dorrian	Lord Justice Clerk	ex officio	
Lady Smith	President of Scottish Tribunals	ex officio	
Eric McQueen	Chief Executive	ex officio	
Sheriff Principal Duncan L Murray	Judicial member		
Sheriff Iona McDonald	Judicial member		
Sheriff A Grant McCulloch	Judicial member		
Johan Findlay JP	Judicial member		
Joe Morrow QC	Judicial member		Lord Lyon King of Arms and President of the Mental Health Tribunal for Scotland
Kirsty J Hood	Advocate member		
Simon J D Cotto	Solicitor member		
Joseph Martin Al-Gharabally	Lay member		
Professor R Hugh MacDougall	Lay member		
Col (Ret.) John David McIlroy	Lay member		

== See also ==
- Scots law
- Her Majesty's Courts and Tribunals Service (for courts and tribunals in England and Wales, and United Kingdom-wide tribunals.)
- Northern Ireland Courts and Tribunals Service
