= Abbot of Cambuskenneth =

The Abbot of Cambuskenneth or Abbot of Stirling (later Commendator of Cambuskenneth) was the head of the Arrouaisian (Augustinian) monastic community of Cambuskenneth Abbey, near Stirling. The long history of the abbey came to a formal end when the abbey was turned into a secular lordship for the last commendator, Alexander Erskine.

The following is a list of abbots and commendators:

== List of abbots ==
- William, 1147–1150
- Isaac, 1152/1153
- Alured, 1152/1153–1171/1178
- Nicholas, 1171/1182–1195
- William, 1207–1235
- Peter, 1235–1240
- Richard, 1253–1269
- Richard Grossus, 1269
- John, 1287–1292
- Patrick, 1295–1296
- Michael, 1307
- Gilbert, 1308/1310
- Fergus, 1311
- John, 1336
- John de Kincardine, 1336
- William, 1342
- Adam, 1350
- Gilbert, 1362–1363
- William de Blackburn, 1390–1398
- Patrick de Callendar, 1401–1434
- David White, 1439–1443
- David Kelly (Celle), 1445–1462
- John, 1465
- Henry Abercrombie, 1466–1502
  - Alexander Ruch (Ruthven), x 1469
- David Arnot, 1503–1509
- Andrew MacBreck, 1509–1511/1513
- Patrick Paniter (Painter), 1513–1519
- Alexander Myln, 1519–1548

== List of commendators ==
- David Paniter, 1549–1558
- Adam Erskine, 1562–1605
  - Alexander Livingstone, 1585
- Alexander Erskine, 1608–1617

== Bibliography ==
- Cowan, Ian B. & Easson, David E., Medieval Religious Houses: Scotland With an Appendix on the Houses in the Isle of Man, Second Edition, (London, 1976), pp. 89–90
- Watt, D.E.R. & Shead, N.F. (eds.), The Heads of Religious Houses in Scotland from the 12th to the 16th Centuries, The Scottish Records Society, New Series, Volume 24, (Edinburgh, 2001), pp. 24–8

== See also ==
- Cambuskenneth Abbey
