= Patrick Panter =

Patrick Panter^{[a]} (born c. 1470 - 1519) Scottish churchman and principal secretary to James IV of Scotland and the infant James V.

== Life ==
Panter was born around 1470 at the village of Newmanswells near Montose. He was educated in Paris. On his return, without taking holy orders, he became Rector of Fetteresso in the Mearns and Vicar of Kilmany in Fife. Panter was also the Preceptor of the Hospital of St Mary in Montrose in 1507. James IV first made him the teacher of his illegitimate son Alexander Stewart, and shortly afterwards his first secretary. Alexander went to Italy with Erasmus, and Panter became tutor to the king's brother, the Earl of Moray.

As rewards, ecclesiastical titles piled up, and next Panter became Archdeacon and Chancellor of Dunkeld, and Archdeacon of Moray in 1509. He exchanged some of these livings to become Rector of Tannadice in Angus in 1510. In 1513 he became Abbot of Cambuskenneth. Panter hoped to become Preceptor of Torphichen, and Henry VIII of England wrote to Leo X in his favour, but it was not to be. Panter held a papal dispensation for holding these church appointments while still not a priest, on account of his duties as royal secretary.

In 1510, Panter was made Customar General of Scotland. In 1511 James IV wrote to the Pope mentioning that only letters for Scotland with Panter's countersignature could be trusted. In 1513 he donned armour at the Battle of Flodden and directed the field artillery, even helping to fire the guns. In May 1515 the Duke of Albany identified him as a Douglas supporter and he was imprisoned on the Isle of Inchgarvie. Soon Panter gained the Duke's confidence and he was included in a diplomatic mission to Paris in July 1517. Panter fell ill and remained in Paris where he died two years later.

David Panter, secretary to Mary, Queen of Scots and John Lesley, Bishop of Ross, was his illegitimate son. David's mother was Margaret Crichton, an illegitimate daughter of William Crichton, Lord Crichton and Margaret Stewart, James IV's aunt.

Panter restored the Hospital of St. Mary in Montrose and was its Preceptor. Carved panels bearing his family heraldry, originally from the Hospital, which were discovered in re-use in a private house in Montrose in the 19th century, are displayed in the National Museum of Scotland in Edinburgh. They are among the most important and well-preserved examples surviving from the relatively small corpus of late medieval Scottish woodwork.

== Nephew ==
A nephew of Patrick, William Lamb adopted his uncle's surname and later wrote Ane Resonyng, a propaganda work addressing the issues of the war of the Rough Wooing.

== Notes ==
^{a} Alternatively spelled 'Paniter' or 'Painter'

== Sources ==
- William Fraser ed., The Cartulary of Cambuskenneth, Registrum Monasterii S. Marie de Cambuskenneth (Grampian Club, 1872), pp. lxii-lxxxvii.
