= Office of the Public Guardian (Scotland) =

Public body in Scotland

Agency overview
- Formed: 2001; 25 years ago
- Type: public body
- Jurisdiction: Scotland
- Headquarters: Hadrian House, Callendar Business Park, Callendar Road, Falkirk, FK1 1XRD
- Agency executive: Fiona Brown, Public Guardian
- Parent agency: Scottish Courts and Tribunals Service
- Key document: Adults with Incapacity (Scotland) Act 2000
- Website: www.publicguardian-scotland.gov.uk

Map
- Scotland in the UK and Europe

The Office of the Public Guardian (OPG) (Scottish Gaelic: Oifig Neach-dìon a' Phobaill) in Scotland is a public body based in Falkirk as part of the Scottish Courts and Tribunals Service, established in April 2001 following the passing of the Adults with Incapacity (Scotland) Act 2000.

== History ==
The Office of the Public Guardian (OPG), which is part of the Scottish Courts and Tribunals Service, was established in April 2001 following the passing of the Adults with Incapacity (Scotland) Act by the Scottish Parliament. It is responsible for supervising the actions of those appointed in terms of the Act to manage the property and financial affairs of adults who lack the capacity to carry out these functions for themselves. It also provides a wide range of advice and guidance.

The OPG is able to investigate concerns where the property or financial affairs of an adult seem to be at risk. The Office of the Public Guardian (OPG) has a range of functions under the Adults with Incapacity (Scotland) Act. The OPG provides information advice and guidance with regard to Powers of Attorney; Access to Funds; Guardianship and Intervention Orders; and investigations.

The OPG also maintains a Public Register of all continuing powers of attorneys, and welfare powers of attorney drawn up after April 2001, all withdrawers appointed under the access to funds scheme and all guardians and interveners appointed by the courts after April 2002.

The OPG investigates concerns where the property or financial affairs of an adult seem to be at risk.

The OPG supervises the actions of withdrawers appointed under the access to funds scheme.

The OPG also supervises all financial guardians and interveners appointed by the courts. As part of this supervision a financial guardian may be required to provide the OPG with a Management Plan, Inventory of Estate and an annual accounting.

== See also ==
- Office of the Public Guardian (England and Wales)
