= High Court of Justiciary =

Supreme criminal court in Scotland

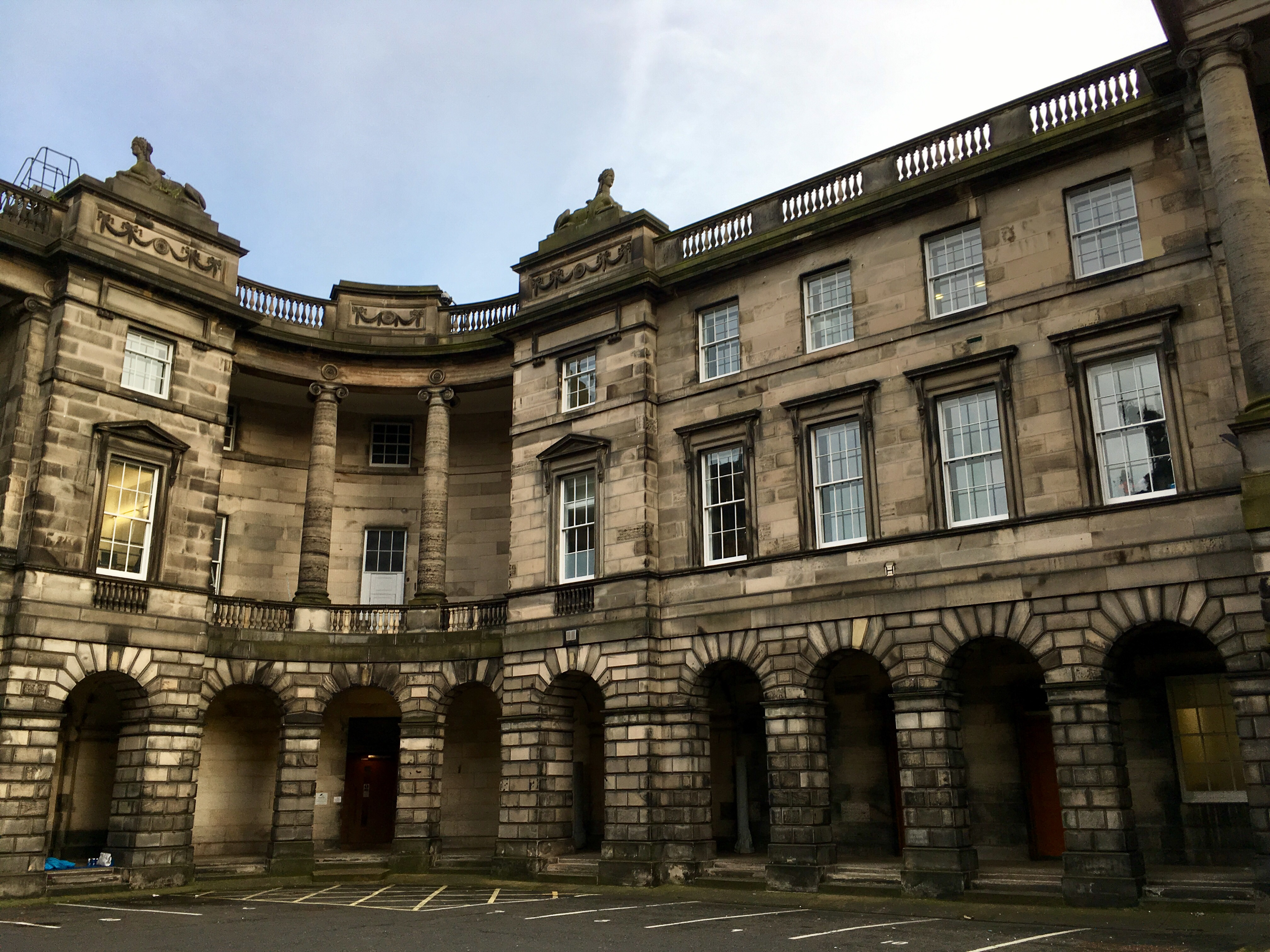
- Scottish version of the Royal Coat of Arms as used by the Courts in Scotland Parliament House, Edinburgh which houses the High Court of Justiciary for trial cases
- Established: 1672; 354 years ago
- Jurisdiction: Scotland
- Location: Edinburgh (Justiciary Building); Glasgow (Justiciary Buildings); Aberdeen (Mercatgate)
- Composition method: Appointed by the Monarch on recommendation of the First Minister of Scotland or Scottish Ministers who receive a recommendation from the Judicial Appointments Board for Scotland
- Authorised by: Courts Act 1672; Criminal Procedure (Scotland) Act 1995
- Appeals to: Supreme Court of the United Kingdom (Note: Limited to appeals on points of law with respect to human rights and devolution issues.)
- Judge term length: Mandatory retirement at age 75
- Number of positions: 36
- Website: www.scotcourts.gov.uk

Lord Justice General
- Currently: Lord Pentland
- Since: 3 February 2025

Lord Justice Clerk
- Currently: Lord Beckett
- Since: 4 February 2025

The High Court of Justiciary (Scottish Gaelic: Àrd-chùirt a' Cheartais) is the supreme criminal court in Scotland. The High Court is both a trial court and a court of appeal. As a trial court, the High Court sits on circuit at Parliament House or in the adjacent Justiciary Building (the former Sheriff Court building) in the Old Town in Edinburgh, or in dedicated buildings in Glasgow and Aberdeen. The High Court sometimes sits in various smaller towns in Scotland, where it uses the local sheriff court building. As an appeal court, the High Court sits only in Edinburgh. On one occasion the High Court of Justiciary sat outside Scotland, at Zeist in the Netherlands during the Pan Am Flight 103 bombing trial, as the Scottish Court in the Netherlands. At Zeist the High Court sat both as a trial court, and an appeal court for the initial appeal by Abdelbaset al-Megrahi.

The president of the High Court is the Lord Justice General, who holds office ex officio by virtue of being Lord President of the Court of Session, and his depute is the Lord Justice Clerk. The remaining judges are the Lords Commissioners of Justiciary, who hold office ex officio by virtue of being appointed as Senators of the College of Justice and judges of the Court of Session. As a court of first instance trials are usually heard with a jury of 15 and a single Lord Commissioner of Justiciary; the jury can convict on a majority verdict. In some cases, such as the trial of Abdelbaset al-Megrahi and Lamin Khalifah Fhimah for the bombing of Pan Am Flight 103, a trial can be heard by a bench of judges alone; sitting without a jury. As an appeal court the hearings are always without a jury, with two judges sitting to hear an appeal against sentence, and three judges sit to hear an appeal against conviction.

The High Court will hear appeals from the sheriff courts of Scotland where the trial was under solemn proceedings; the High Court will also hear referrals on points of law from the Sheriff Appeal Court, and from summary proceedings in the sheriff courts and justice of the peace courts. Cases can be remitted to the High Court by the sheriff courts after conviction for sentencing, where a sheriff believes that their sentencing powers are inadequate. The High Court can impose a life sentence but the sheriff has a limit of five years sentencing; both can issue an unlimited fine.

As of 4 February 2025, the Lord Justice General was Lord Pentland, the Lord Justice Clerk was Lord Beckett, and there were a total of 36 Lords Commissioners of Justiciary.

== History ==
=== Justiciar ===
The origins derive from the Justiciar and College of Justice, as well as from the medieval royal courts and barony courts. The medieval Justiciar (royal judge) took its name from the justices who originally travelled around Scotland hearing cases on circuit or 'ayre'. From 1524, the Justiciar or a depute was required to have a "permanent base" in Edinburgh.

The King of Scots sometimes sat in judgment of cases in the early King's Court, and it appears that appeals could be taken from the King's Court to the Parliament of Scotland in civil cases but not in criminal ones. In 1532 the College of Justice was founded, separating civil and criminal jurisdiction between two distinct courts. The King's Court was, however, normally the responsibility of the Justiciar. The Justiciar normally appointed several deputes to assist in the administration of justice, and to preside in his absence. A legally qualified clerk advised the Justiciar and his deputes as they were generally noblemen and often not legally qualified. This clerk prepared all the indictments and was keeper of the records. Eventually the influence of the clerk increased until the clerk gained both a vote in the court, and a seat on the bench as the Justice-Clerk.

=== Courts Act 1672 ===
Courts Act 1672
- Act of Parliament
- Parliament of Scotland
- Long title: Act concerning the Regulation of the Judicatories.
- Citation: 1672 c. 40 (S)
- Territorial extent: Scotland

Dates
- Royal assent: 30 August 1672
Other legislation
Amended by	Statute Law Revision (Scotland) Act 1906; Statute Law Revision (Scotland) Act 1964; Criminal Procedure (Scotland) Act 1975

Status: Amended

Revised text of statute as amended

Text of the Courts Act 1672 as in force today (including any amendments) within the United Kingdom, from legislation.gov.uk.

The High Court in its modern form was founded in 1672 by the Courts Act 1672 (c. 40 (S)), when five of the Lords of Session (judges of the Court of Session) were added as permanent judges of the Justice Court. Previously the Lord Justice General had appointed deputes to preside in the court. From 1672 to 1887, the High Court consisted of the Lord Justice General, Lord Justice Clerk, and five Lords of Session.

The Court Act 1672 also gave statutory effect to the position of the Lord Justice Clerk, and the Lord Justice-General was made president of the Court, and the Justice-Clerk vice-president. During the period when the office of Lord Justice-General was held by noblemen the Lord Justice-Clerk was virtual head of the Justiciary Court.

=== Treaty of Union ===
Article XIX of the Treaty of Union that united Scotland and England into Great Britain preserved the High Court of Justiciary, though now the High Court was subject to the Parliament of Great Britain which could enact "...regulations for the better administration of Justice". Dominic Scullion, writing in the Aberdeen Student Law Review in 2010, identified that the Union of England and Scotland saw an increase in references to English law and cases in the reports of the High Court. However, Scullion identified that it was only in the latter half of the 20th century that the judgments of the High Court were directly influenced by English decisions and precedent.

The High Court of Justiciary remained the final authority on all matters of criminal law after the Act of Union, though the Parliament of Great Britain appears to have had appellate jurisdiction through the judicial functions of the House of Lords this appeared to have little effect in practice. In 1713 a case (Magistrates of Elgin v. Ministers of Elgin) was heard by the House of Lords which overturned a decision of the High Court. However, in 1781 the House of Lords resolved that there could be no appeal from the High Court, as no right of appeal had existed beyond the Court beyond the Treaty of Union.

=== 19th Century ===
==== Unification of judiciary ====
The Court of Session Act 1830 united the offices of Lord President of the Court of Session and Lord Justice General, with the person appointed as Lord President assuming the office of Lord Justice General ex officio.

In 1834 the five Lords of Session who were appointed as Lords Commissioners of Justiciary were paid an additional allowance of £600 over their basic salary of £2,000. A Select Committee of the House of Commons was appointed to investigate the remuneration and working conditions of the Lords of Session and Lords Commissioners of Justiciary. The Select Committee recommended that all the Lords of Session should be made Lords Commissioners of Justiciary and that the additional allowance be abolished. At the same time the Committee recommended that the basic salary of a Senator be increased to £3,000.

The membership of the court remained unchanged until 1887 when all of the Senators of the College of Justice were made Lords Commissioners of Justiciary, by the Criminal Procedure (Scotland) Act 1887. Writing in 1896, Charles Pearson attested that no appeal was competent from the High Court to the House of Lords.

==== Supremacy of High Court ====
The House of Lords made a final determination in the case of Mackintosh v. Lord Advocate (1876) 2 App. Cas. 41 that it had no jurisdiction over criminal appeals, as it had inherited the power of the Parliament of Scotland to hear civil appeals, but that the pre-union Parliament did not have any jurisdiction to hear criminal appeals.

=== 20th century ===
==== Criminal Procedure (Scotland) Act 1995 ====
In 1913, Edwin Keedy, writing in the Journal of the American Institute of Criminal Law and Criminology, would affirm that the High Court "is the Supreme Court for the trial of criminal causes".

The supremacy of the High Court was affirmed by Section 124 of the Criminal Procedure (Scotland) Act 1995, which stated:

...every interlocutor and sentence pronounced by the High Court under this Part of this Act shall be final and conclusive and not subject to review by any court whatsoever... — Criminal Procedure (Scotland) Act 1995

==== Scottish devolution ====
Scottish devolution and the establishment of the Scottish Parliament by the Scotland Act 1998 introduced the right to refer points of law to the Judicial Committee of the Privy Council. Such points of law related to human rights compatibility issues or related to devolution issues. Devolution issues are concerned with the legislative competence of the Scottish Parliament and the executive functions of the Scottish Government under the Scotland Act 1998.

=== 21st century ===
==== Scottish Court in the Netherlands ====
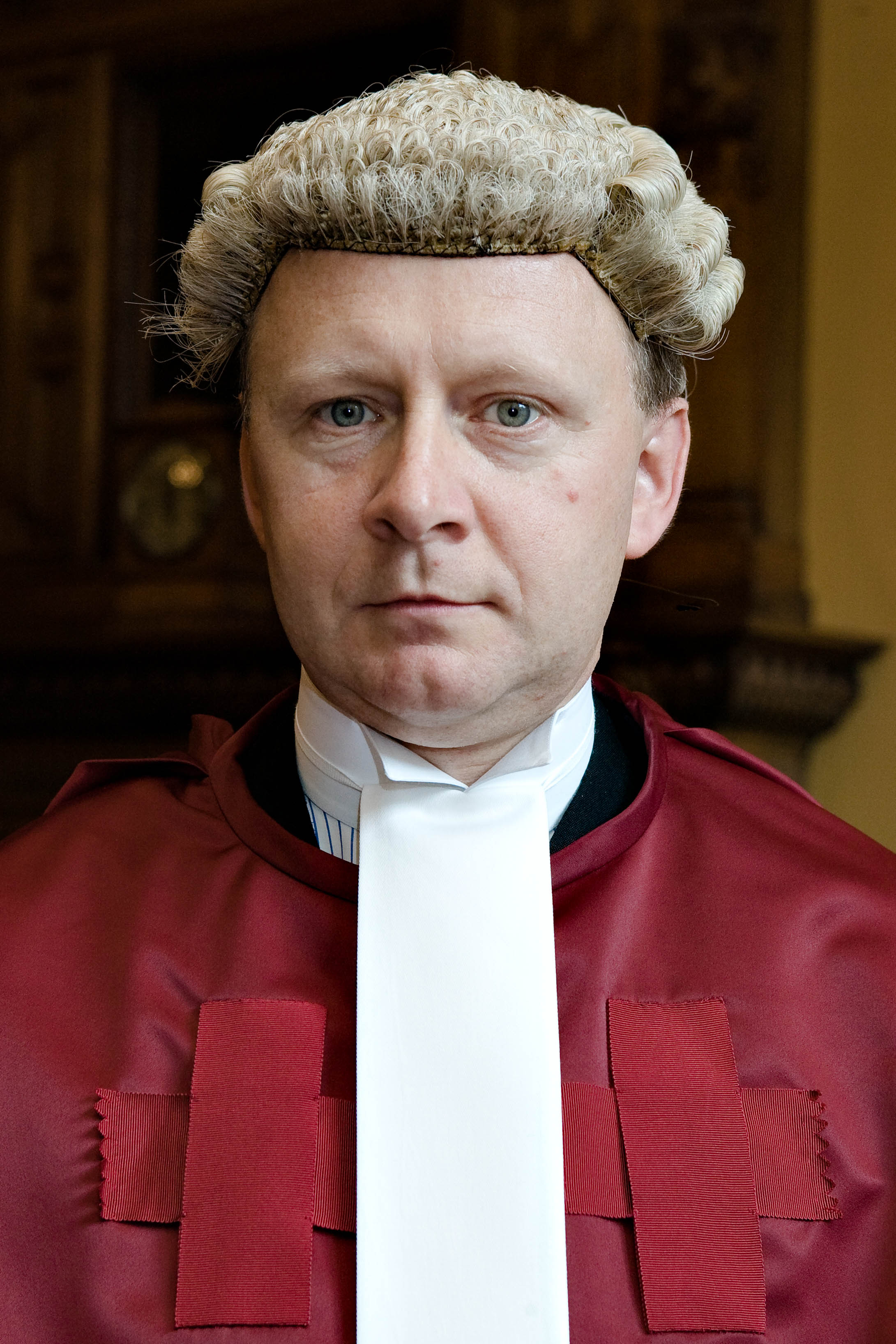
Alan Turnbull, Lord Turnbull, one of the lead prosecutors in the Pan Am Flight 103 bombing trial

From May 2000 until March 2002 the High Court of Justiciary sat as the Scottish Court in the Netherlands to try Abdelbaset al-Megrahi and Lamin Khalifah Fhimah for the bombing of Pan Am Flight 103. The Pan Am Flight 103 bombing trial required a treaty between the Government of the United Kingdom and Government of the Kingdom of the Netherlands which created extraterritoriality for the Scottish Court, with Camp Zeist in Utrecht (a disused United States Air Force base) made a subject of Scots law.

Legal effect was given to the treaty in the United Kingdom by the High Court of Justiciary Order 1998, an Order in Council. The order empowered the Lord Justice Clerk to appoint three Lords Commissioners of Justiciary to sit as bench trial as both trier of fact and for determining any points of law. The High Court had full authority to determine contempt of court relating to the proceedings.

Following the conviction, which was upheld on appeal of Abdelbaset al-Megrahi, the Scottish Court in the Netherlands ceased to sit. Subsequent appeals were heard in Scotland.

==== Supreme Court of the United Kingdom ====
The jurisdiction of the Judicial Committee of the Privy Council in human rights and devolution issues was transferred to the Supreme Court of the United Kingdom by the Constitutional Reform Act 2005. Such a transfer was not without controversy, as commentators, including the Law Society of Scotland and the Advocate General for Scotland, noted that this notionally placed an English court in a position of superiority to the High Court.

In May 2013, the Supreme Court's guidance on its jurisdiction over Scottish appeals stated that:

The changes to the Supreme Court’s jurisdiction....in Scottish criminal cases as a result of the Scotland Act 2012...ensured that the High Court of Justiciary retained the power ultimately to resolve cases once the Supreme Court has determined the legal question at issue

— The Jurisdiction of the Supreme Court of the United Kingdom in Scottish Appeals

Section 35 of the Scotland Act 2012 modified the procedure for referrals by removing the ability of the Supreme Court to determine the final judgment of the case; in essence a criminal case cannot be remitted to the Supreme Court. The Scotland Act 2012 requires that once the point of law has been decided upon by the Supreme Court, it is for the High Court to resolve the case. An issue can be referred to the Supreme Court either by the Lords Commissioners of Justiciary who are presiding, the Lord Advocate, or the Advocate General for Scotland. Though where two or more Lords Commissioners are presiding they may determine the human rights issue without referral to the Supreme Court.

== Remit and jurisdiction ==
=== First instance jurisdiction ===
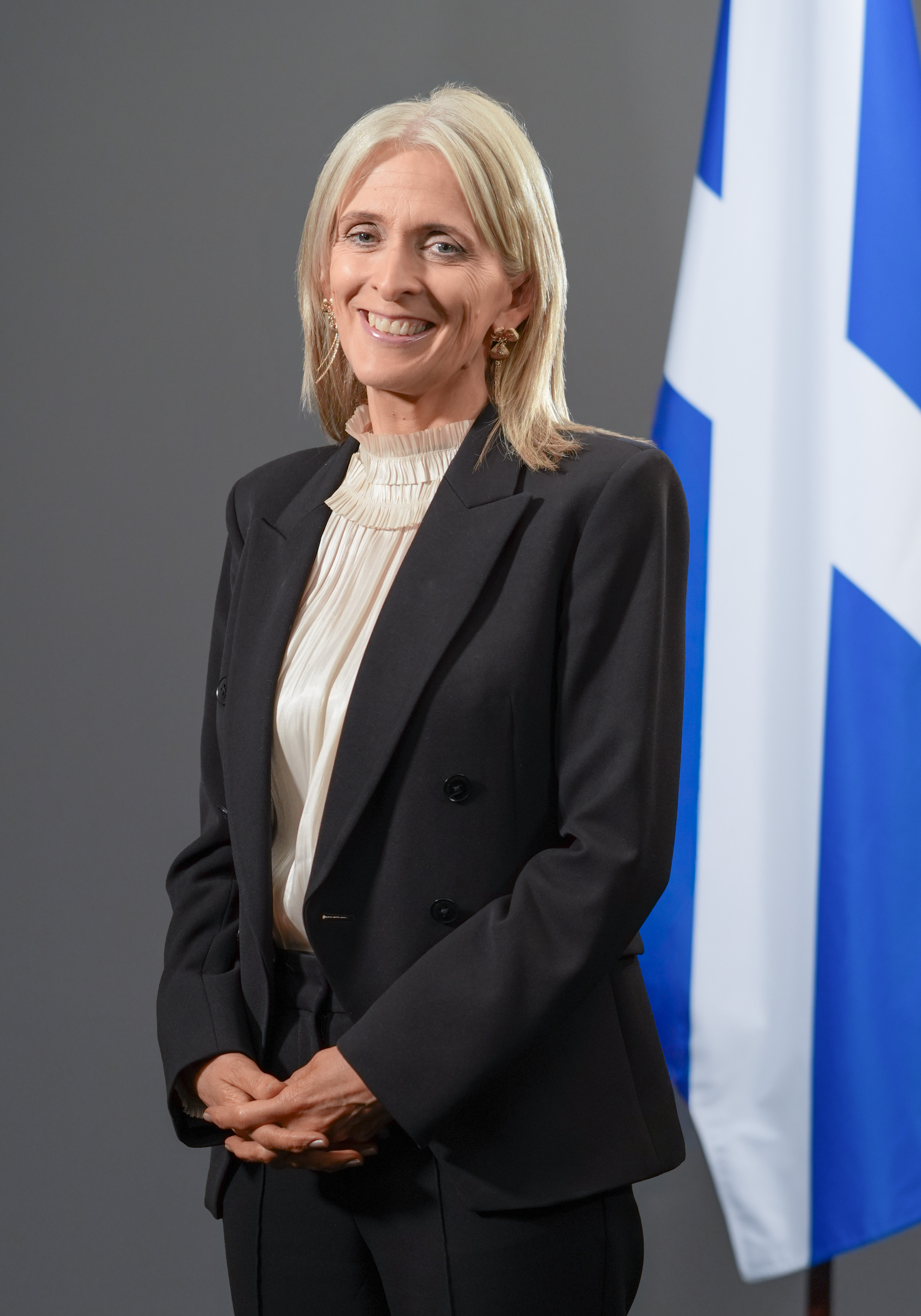
High Court cases are prosecuted in the public interest by the Lord Advocate, who is usually represented in such cases by Advocates Depute

The High Court has jurisdiction over all crimes in Scotland unless restricted by statute. The High Court has exclusive jurisdiction over serious crimes such as treason, murder, and rape and, in practice, deals with armed robbery, drug trafficking, and sexual offences involving children (over which it shares jurisdiction with the sheriff court).

As a court of first instance the court sits regularly in various places in Scotland, with permanent seats in Edinburgh, Glasgow and Aberdeen. There are sittings when required in Dumbarton, Lanark, Livingston, Paisley and Stirling.

Trials in the High Court are usually jury trials, with a single Lord Commissioner of Justiciary presiding (although two or more judges may sit in important or difficult cases) with a jury of fifteen individuals; in Scotland this is known as solemn proceedings. Under the Scottish legal system, the jury can convict on a majority verdict of at least ten jurors (reduced to nine if the number of jurors falls to 13 or eight if the number of jurors falls to 12), and need not return a unanimous verdict. The Scottish legal system historically permitted a verdict of 'not proven' as well as verdicts of 'guilty' or 'not guilty', but the verdict of 'not proven' was abolished with effect from 1 January 2026 for all trials that commenced on or after that date, Juries may add a rider to their verdict as additional commentary on their verdict. The 'not proven' verdict had the same consequence as 'not guilty'. If jurors cannot reach the minimum number of jurors required to convict the accused of a charge on the indictment (or an alternative verdict), then the accused will be acquitted.

Cases in the High Court are prosecuted in the public interest by the Lord Advocate, who is usually represented in such cases by Advocates Depute. A private prosecution can be brought before the High Court, but this is very rare and difficult as it requires the concurrence of the Lord Advocate and for the High Court to issue a bill for criminal letters. When families of the victims of the 2014 Glasgow bin lorry crash applied for such a bill, their request was denied by the High Court in 2016 on the basis that there was insufficient evidence. The then Lord Justice Clerk, Lady Dorrian, along with Lord Menzies and Lord Drummond Young further concluded that the case did not present special circumstances to enable granting of the bill.

Bail can be granted by the High Court to any accused person and "bail is to be granted to an accused person except where there is good reason for refusing bail." The Bail, Judicial Appointments etc. (Scotland) Act 2000, an Act of the Scottish Parliament, had removed the previous restrictions on bail that meant that murder and treason were not ordinarily bailable. However, a person could be bailed when accused of these of crimes on application of the Lord Advocate or by a decision of the High Court itself. The Criminal Proceedings etc. (Reform) (Scotland) Act 2007 did reintroduce restrictions on the granting of bail by requiring exceptional circumstances to be shown when a person is accused of violent, sexual, or drugs offences, and they have a prior conviction for a similar offence.

In Scotland, the focus is normally for those who are opposed to bail to convince the courts that bail should not be granted, with the procurator fiscal given guidance to use the nature and gravity of an offence as grounds to oppose bail.

Buildings of the High Court of Justiciary
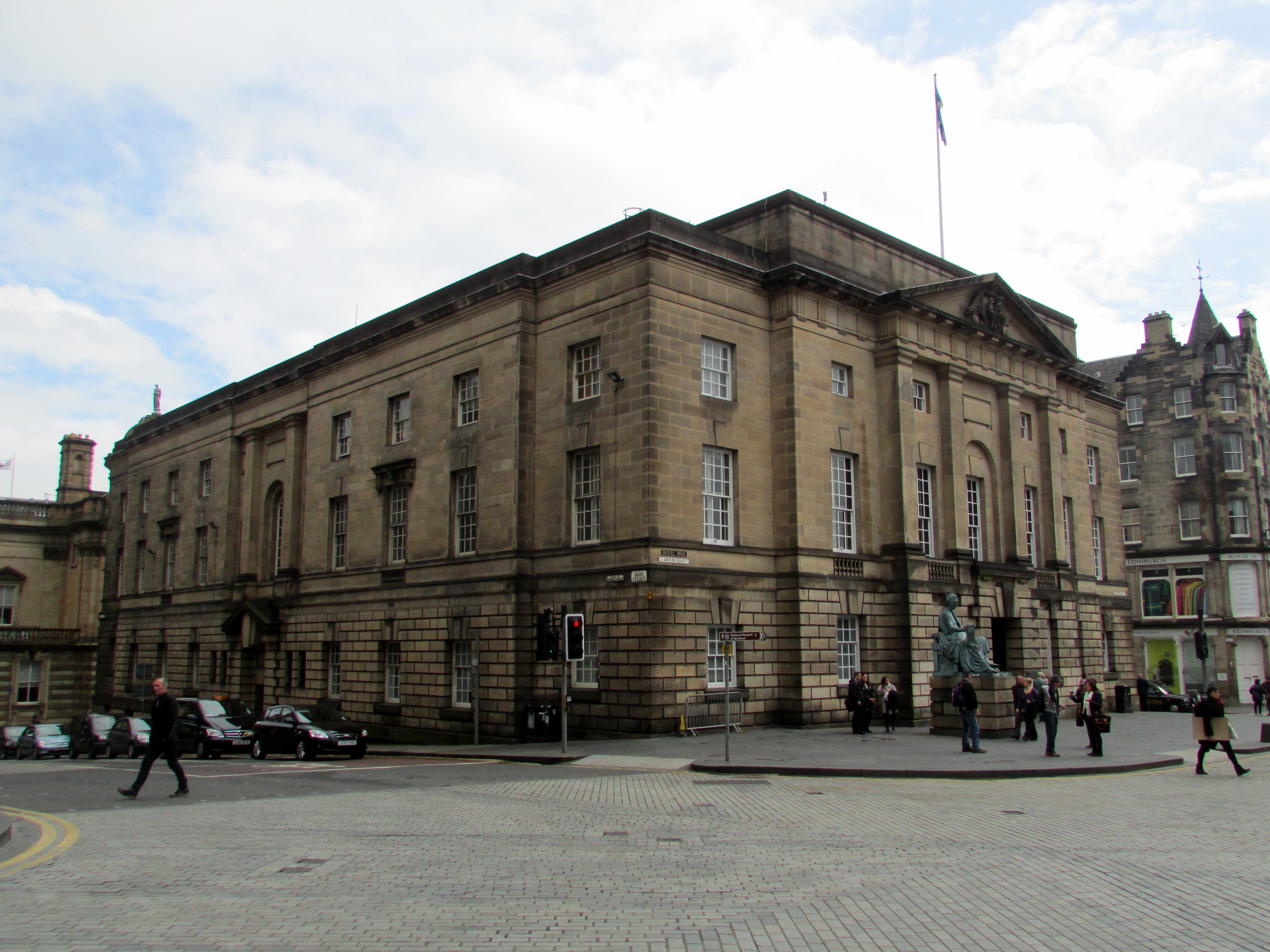
Justiciary Building, Edinburgh

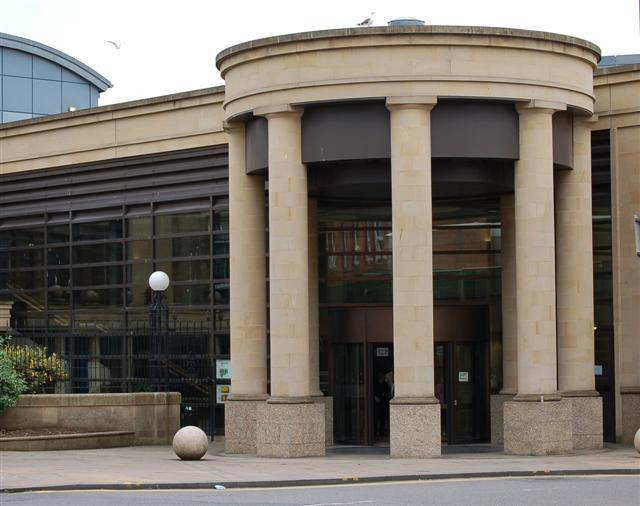
Justiciary Buildings, Glasgow

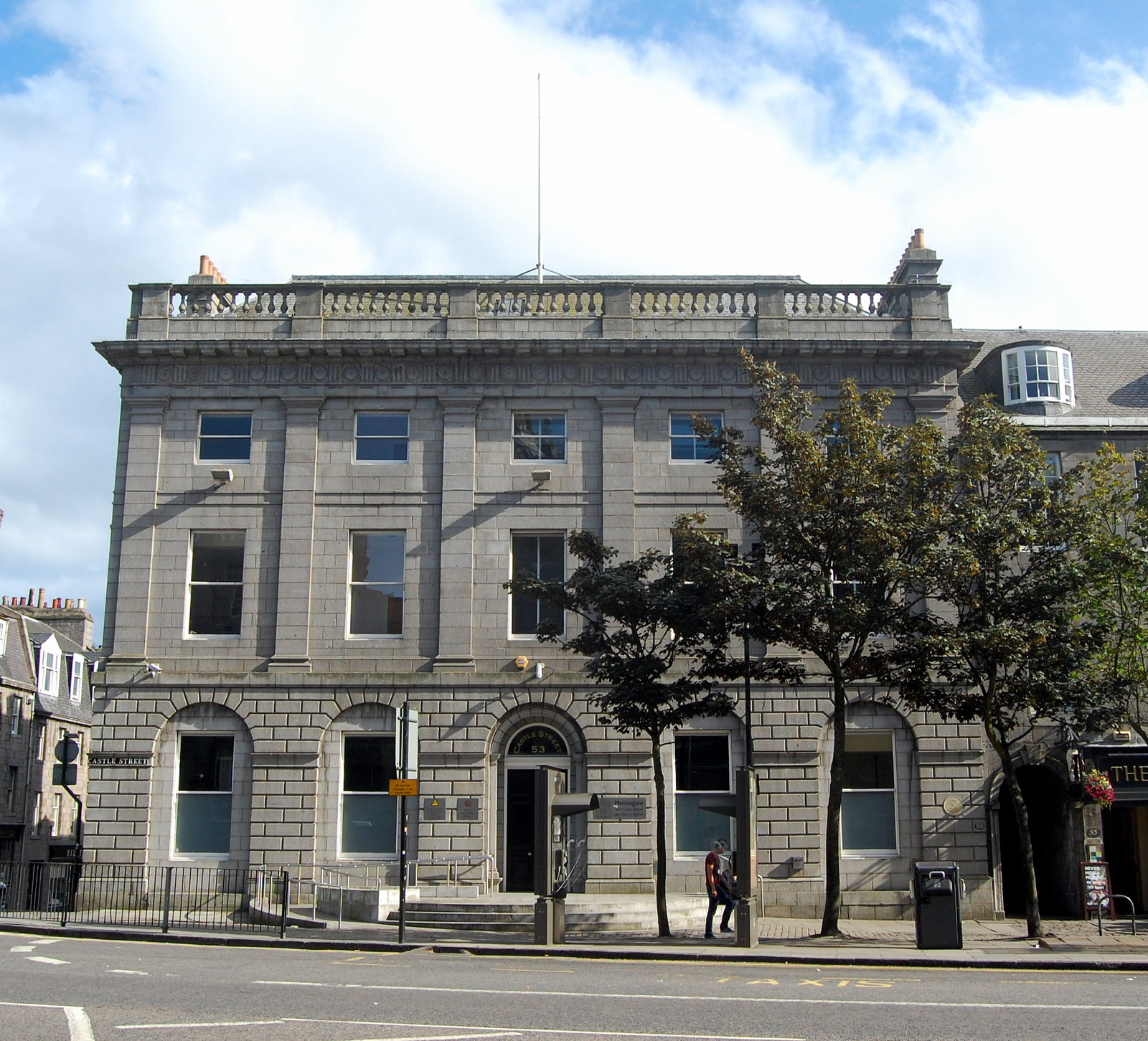
Aberdeen Sheriff Court Annex and High Court of Justiciary

=== Sentencing on conviction by sheriff court ===
Following a conviction under solemn proceedings in a sheriff court, Section 195 of the Criminal Procedure (Scotland) Act 1995 allows a sheriff to remit the case to the High Court for sentencing, should the sheriff believes their powers of sentencing to be inadequate for the crime committed. A sheriff in solemn proceedings can impose a maximum sentence of up to 5 years imprisonment or an unlimited fine, and the High Court can impose a life sentence (unless a lesser maximum sentence is prescribed by statute) as well as an unlimited fine. Once a case is remitted, the High Court can treat the case as if it had been tried before a Lord Commissioner of Justiciary.

=== Appellate jurisdiction ===
Criminal Appeal (Scotland) Act 1926 (Note: Section 19(1).)
- Act of Parliament
- Parliament of the United Kingdom
- Long title: An Act to amend the law of Scotland relating to appeal in criminal cases tried on indictment.
- Citation: 16 & 17 Geo. 5. c. 15
- Territorial extent: Scotland

Dates
- Royal assent: 8 July 1926
- Commencement: 1 November 1926 (Note: Section 19(2).)
Other legislation
Amended by	Criminal Appeal (Scotland) Act 1927; Criminal Justice (Scotland) Act 1949; Statute Law (Repeals) Act 1971; Criminal Procedure (Scotland) Act 1975; Statute Law (Repeals) Act 1977

Status: Amended

Text of statute as originally enacted

Revised text of statute as amended

Text of the Criminal Appeal (Scotland) Act 1926 as in force today (including any amendments) within the United Kingdom, from legislation.gov.uk.

Following the Criminal Appeal (Scotland) Act 1926 (16 & 17 Geo. 5. c. 15), when the Scottish High Court of Justiciary hears criminal appeals, it is known as the Court of Criminal Appeal. The Criminal Appeal (Scotland) Act 1927 (17 & 18 Geo. 5. c. 26) was passed the following year specifically to deal with the Case of Oscar Slater.

The court consists of at least three judges when hearing appeals against conviction and two when hearing appeals against sentence, although more judges may sit when the court is dealing with exceptionally difficult cases or those where important matters of law may be considered. This is known as a full bench. Appeals by right are heard from the High Court of Justiciary (sitting at first instance) and sheriff courts sitting in solemn procedure; with appeals, with leave, on questions of law are heard from the Sheriff Appeal Court. Appeals against sentence or conviction in summary proceedings before the sheriff courts or justice of the peace courts are heard before the Sheriff Appeal Court. The High Court also hears appeals in cases referred to it by the Scottish Criminal Cases Review Commission.

Leave to appeal is granted by a Lord Commissioner of Justiciary in chambers under sections 106 and 107 of the Criminal Procedure (Scotland) Act 1995 when a person is convicted in solemn procedure in either the High Court or sheriff courts, with the High Court sitting as the Appeal Court.

Appeals against convictions or sentence in summary procedure heard in sheriff courts and justice of the peace courts are now heard by the Sheriff Appeal Court. However, referrals on points of law may be heard in the High Court from the Sheriff Appeal Court with the permission of the High Court. Two judges sit to hear an appeal against sentence, and three judges sit to hear an appeal against conviction. The High Court of Justiciary sits as an appeal court in Edinburgh.

The High Court, as a collegiate court, has the ability to convene a bench of greater numbers of Lords Commissioners of Justiciary to overturn decisions and precedent established by previous appeals. Such a decision is made by the High Court on its own initiative. It is possible for the entire High Court to sit in determination of an appeal.

In exceptional circumstances, a person may petition the Scottish Criminal Cases Review Commission, who have the authority to refer an appeal back to the High Court of Justiciary, if the Commission determine that a miscarriage of justice has or might have occurred.

Under Section 35 of the Scotland Act 2012, the High Court as an Appeal Court will also hear referrals on human rights compatibility issues from the Sheriff Appeal Court, sheriff courts, and from cases being heard at first-instance by a single Lord Commissioner of Justiciary. The High Court can then make a determination on that issue, or it can refer the matter to the Supreme Court of the United Kingdom.

=== Appeals from the High Court ===
==== Devolution and human rights issues ====
The High Court of Justiciary has the final authority on matters of criminal law in Scotland, and thus no appeal beyond the High Court is possible on the grounds of sentence or conviction. However, it is possible to refer a point of law to the Supreme Court of the United Kingdom relating to human rights compatibility issues or relating to devolution issues. Devolution issues are concerned with the legislative competence of the Scottish Parliament and the executive functions of the Scottish Government under the Scotland Act 1998. Such referrals are made to the Supreme Court of the United Kingdom under Schedule 6 of the Scotland Act 1998 or Section 288A of the Criminal Procedure (Scotland) Act 1995. For a referral to proceed permission must be granted by two or more Lords Commissioners of Justiciary, or by the Supreme Court itself.

The most frequent devolution issues raised related to Article 6 of the European Convention on Human Rights, which mandates the right to a fair trial, and the role of the Lord Advocate who is both the chief public prosecutor and a member of the Scottish Government. Under the Scotland Act 1998 the Lord Advocate could do nothing that was incompatible with the European Convention on Human Rights, and should his actions be deemed incomparable then they were null and void. This led to the case of Cadder v HM Advocate where the Supreme Court of the United Kingdom ruled that the police in Scotland could not question a suspect without granting that person access to a solicitor. This was one case, along with Fraser v HM Advocate, that led the Scottish Government to raise concerns with HM Government that it appeared that "virtually any objection, challenge, or point of law can be characterised as a devolution issue", thus undermining the High Court's final jurisdiction in criminal matters. The Scotland Act 2012 modified provisions around devolution issues by no longer rendering null and void those actions of the Lord Advocate that were incompatible with the European Convention, but still allowing a right to appeal against those actions on grounds of incompatibility.

==== Supreme Court of the United Kingdom ====
The Supreme Court of the United Kingdom was established by the Constitutional Reform Act 2005, and is the highest court in the United Kingdom for civil cases and those matters relating to human rights and devolution. Prior to the establishment of the Supreme Court of the United Kingdom devolution issues were decided by the Judicial Committee of the Privy Council, whose members were the Lords of Appeal in Ordinary (who exercised the judicial functions of the House of Lords.) However, the two bodies were legally and constitutionally separate.

=== Acts of Adjournal ===
The High Court of Justiciary as a Court, or the Lord Justice General, Lord Justice Clerk and Lords Commissioners of Justiciary as a body, have the power to regulate criminal procedure in the criminal courts in Scotland: regulations can be made for the High Court, sheriff courts (summary and solemn procedures), and the justice of the peace courts. Such regulations are promulgated by Acts of Adjournal, which take the form of subordinate legislation as Scottish Statutory Instruments, under powers granted by Section 305 of the Criminal Procedure (Scotland) Act 1995. Schedule 6 of the Scotland Act 1998 also grants that Acts of Adjournal can be used to regulate the procedure for referring a question of law relating to a devolution issue to either the High Court or the Supreme Court of the United Kingdom.

Section 305 of the 1995 Act states:

(1) The High Court may by Act of Adjournal—

(a) regulate the practice and procedure in relation to criminal procedure;

(b) make such rules and regulations as may be necessary or expedient to carry out the purposes and accomplish the objects of any enactment (including an enactment in this Act) in so far as it relates to criminal procedure;

(c) subject to subsection (5) (Note: Subsection 5 relates to court fees which are regulated by Scottish Ministers under Section 107 of the Courts Reform (Scotland) Act 2014, having replaced earlier rules conferred by the Courts of Law Fees (Scotland) Act 1895.) below, to fix and regulate the fees payable in connection with summary criminal proceedings; and

(d) make provision for the application of sums paid under section 220 of this Act and for any matter incidental thereto.

(2) The High Court may by Act of Adjournal modify, amend or repeal any enactment (including an enactment in this Act) in so far as that enactment relates to matters with respect to which an Act of Adjournal may be made under subsection (1) above...

— Section 305, Criminal Procedure (Scotland) Act 1995

Thus the Lord Justice General, Lord Justice Clerk, and Lords Commissioners of Justiciary have the power to modify and amend primary legislation, where that primary legislation deals with a matter of criminal procedure. The Criminal Courts Rules Council on 8 February 2016 considered Section 288BA of the Criminal Procedure (Scotland) Act 1995 (which prescribes rules for dockets and indictments for sexual offences) and asked the Lord President's Private Office to consider if this could be modified by Act of Adjournal. A draft Act of Adjournal was also prepared in 2011 to amend the 1995 Act as the Rules Council was awaiting primary legislation, and the Rules Council agreed to proceed with the Act of Adjournal. The Act of Adjournal amended the 1995 Act by adding Sections 75C and 137ZB to enable the court to discharge, vary and change the diet (sittings) of a case.

== Rights of audience ==
Members of the Faculty of Advocates, known as advocates or counsel, and as of 1990 also some solicitors, known as solicitor-advocates, have practically exclusive right of audience rights of audience in the court. Until 1990 only advocates had any right of audience before the High Court, but the Law Reform (Miscellaneous Provisions) (Scotland Act) 1990 allowed solicitors to apply for enhanced rights and become solicitor-advocates.

== Judges and office holders ==
=== President and judges ===
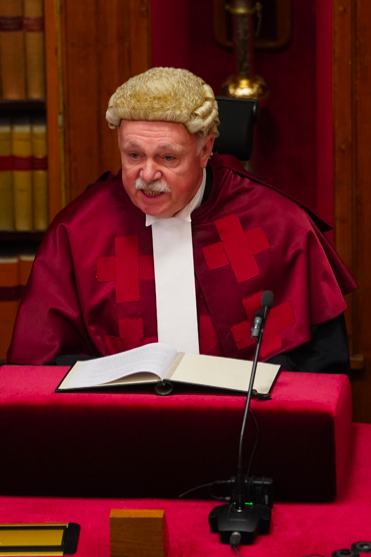
Lord Pentland, the current Lord President of the Court of Session

The court's president is the Lord Justice General; the second most senior judge is the Lord Justice Clerk; and a further 35 Senators of the College of Justice hold office as Lords Commissioners of Justiciary. The total numbers of judges is fixed by Section 1 of the Court of Session Act 1988, subject to amendment by Order in Council (the last order was made in 2022 and increased the number of judges to 36.) Judges are appointed for life, subject to dismissal if they are found unfit for office, and subject to a compulsory retirement age of 75.

The court is a unitary collegiate court, with all judges other than the Lord Justice General and the Lord Justice Clerk holding the same rank and title: Lord Commissioner of Justiciary. There are 36, in addition to a number of temporary judges; these temporary judges can be sheriffs principal, sheriffs, or advocates in private practice. The judges sit also in the Court of Session, where they are known as Lords of Council and Session; in the Court of Session the Lord Justice General is called the Lord President of the Court of Session.

==== Lord Justice General ====
The Lord Justice General is the most senior judge of the High Court of Justiciary. The Lord Justice General will sit as chairperson in the Court of Criminal Appeal.

==== Lord Justice Clerk ====
The Justice Clerk is the second most senior judge of the High Court, and deputises for the Lord Justice General when the latter is absent, or is unable to fulfil his duties, or when there is a vacancy for Lord Justice General. The Lord Justice Clerk will sit as chairperson in the Court of Criminal Appeal.

==== Lords Commissioners of Justiciary ====
As of June 2026 the judges of the High Court of Justiciary are:
Name	Judicial title	Office	Year appointed to High Court
Paul Cullen KC	The Rt Hon Lord Pentland	Lord President of the Court of Session; Lord Justice General	2020
John Beckett KC	The Rt Hon Lord Beckett	Lord Justice Clerk	2016
Colin Campbell KC	The Rt Hon Lord Malcolm	Senator of the College of Justice	2007
Hugh Matthews KC	The Rt Hon Lord Matthews	Senator of the College of Justice	2007
Colin Tyre CBE KC	The Rt Hon Lord Tyre	Senator of the College of Justice	2010
Morag Wise KC	The Rt Hon Lady Wise	Senator of the College of Justice	2016
S Neil Brailsford KC	The Hon Lord Brailsford	Senator of the College of Justice	2006
Iain Armstrong KC	The Hon Lord Armstrong	Senator of the College of Justice	2013
Alistair Clark KC	The Hon Lord Clark	Senator of the College of Justice	2016
Andrew Stewart KC	The Hon Lord Ericht	Senator of the College of Justice	2016
Ailsa Carmichael KC	The Hon Lady Carmichael	Senator of the College of Justice	2016
Frank Mulholland KC	The Rt Hon Lord Mulholland	Senator of the College of Justice	2016
Alan Summers KC	The Hon Lord Summers	Senator of the College of Justice	2017
Paul Arthurson KC	The Hon Lord Arthurson	Senator of the College of Justice	2017
Douglas Fairley KC	The Hon Lord Fairley	Senator of the College of Justice	2020
Anna Poole KC	The Hon Lady Poole	Senator of the College of Justice	2020
Sean Smith KC	The Hon Lord Harrower	Senator of the College of Justice	2020
Robert Weir KC	The Hon Lord Weir	Senator of the College of Justice	2020
Peter Braid	The Hon Lord Braid	Senator of the College of Justice	2020
Craig Sandison KC	The Hon Lord Sandison	Senator of the College of Justice	2021
Shona Haldane KC	The Hon Lady Haldane	Senator of the College of Justice	2021
Martin Richardson KC	The Hon Lord Richardson	Senator of the College of Justice	2021
Lorna Drummond KC	The Hon Lady Drummond	Senator of the College of Justice	2022
Andrew Young KC	The Hon Lord Young	Senator of the College of Justice	2022
Jonathan Lake KC	The Hon Lord Lake	Senator of the College of Justice	2022
John Scott KC	The Hon Lord Scott	Senator of the College of Justice	2022
Michael Stuart KC	The Hon Lord Stuart	Senator of the College of Justice	2022
Craig Turnbull	The Hon Lord Colbeck	Senator of the College of Justice	2023
Andrew Cubie	The Hon Lord Cubie	Senator of the College of Justice	2024
Kirsty Hood KC	The Hon Lady Hood	Senator of the College of Justice	2024
Ronaldo Renucci KC	The Hon Lord Renucci	Senator of the College of Justice	2024
Morag Ross KC	The Hon Lady Ross	Senator of the College of Justice	2024
Fiona Tait	The Hon Lady Tait	Senator of the College of Justice	2025

=== Appointment ===
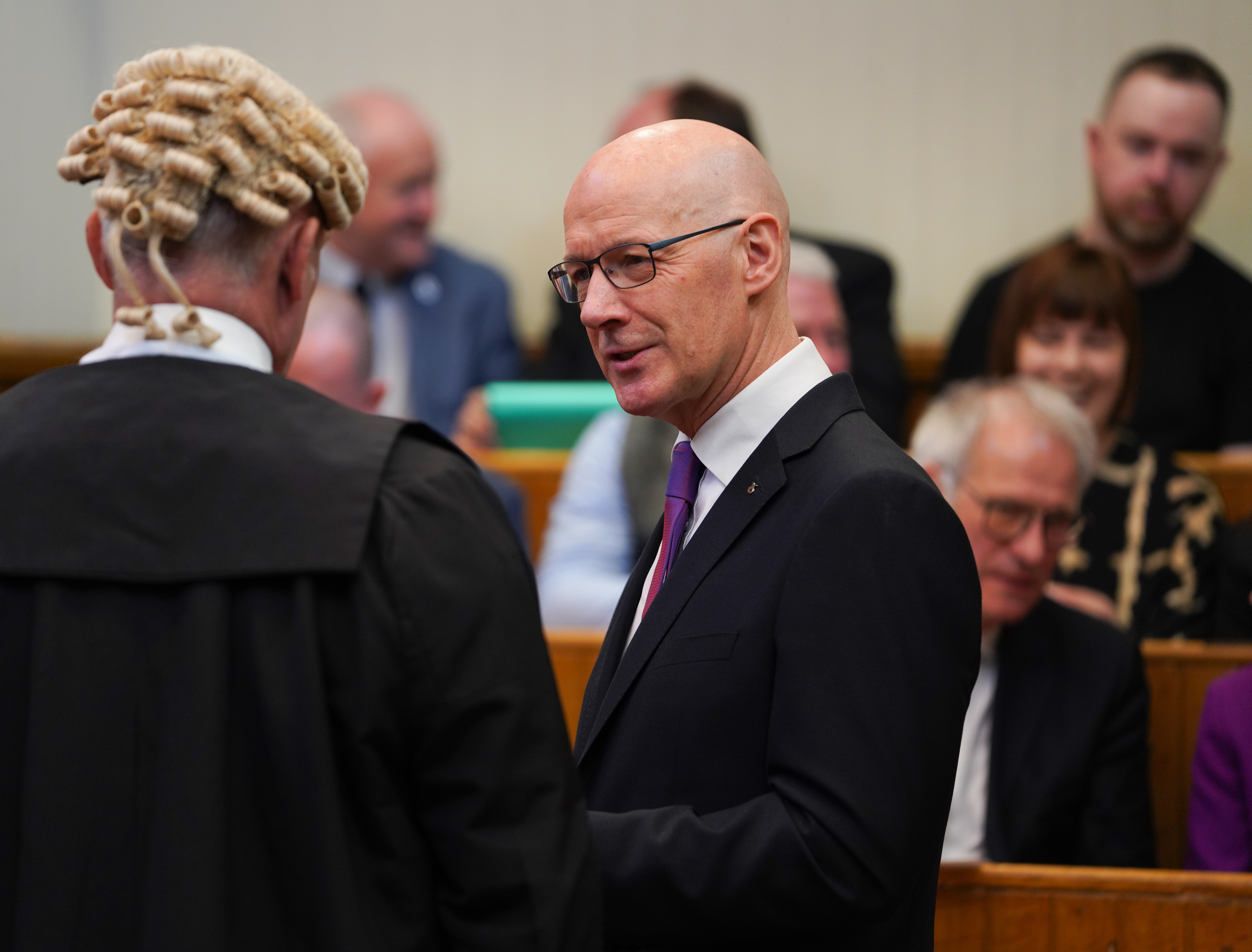
Appointments to the High Court of Justiciary are made by the First Minister of Scotland

To be eligible for appointment as a Lord Commissioner of Justiciary, or temporary judge, a person must have served at least 5 years as sheriff or sheriff principal; or been an advocate for 5 years, or a solicitor with 5 years rights of audience before the Court of Session or High Court of Justiciary; or been a Writer to the Signet for 10 years (having passed the exam in civil law at least 2 years before application.)

Appointments are made by the Monarch on the recommendation of the First Minister of Scotland following a recruitment exercise undertaken by the Judicial Appointments Board for Scotland. The Judicial Appointments Board has statutory authority to make recommendations under Sections 9 to 27 of the Judiciary and Courts (Scotland) Act 2008 (as amended by the Courts Reform (Scotland) Act 2014). Appointments to the Inner House are made by the Lord President and Lord Justice Clerk, with the consent of the Scottish Ministers.

Temporary judges can also be appointed by the Scottish Ministers provided that person would also be eligible for appointment as permanent judge of the High Court. Originally the power was granted by Section 35 of the Law Reform (Miscellaneous Provisions) (Scotland) Act 1990, but the enactment was repealed and replaced by Section 123 of the Courts Reform (Scotland) Act 2014. Such temporary judges are appointed for a period of 5 years.

Section 123 of Courts Reform (Scotland) Act 2014 allows the Lord Justice General to appoint former senators, and former Justices of the Supreme Court of the United Kingdom, to the High Court provided they are under 75 years of age. The tenure of such appointments is determined by the Lord Justice General.

Lord Gill, Lord Justice General from 2012 to 2015, issued guidance in 2013 on the use temporary judges which stipulated that:

Temporary judges will be used only where there are, for reasons of a temporary nature, an insufficient number of permanent judges to meet the demands of business and the Lord President has approved their use.

— Lord Gill, Guidelines for the Use of Temporary Judges (2013)

Further stating that the preference would be to allocate business to temporary judges who were already, had previously been, a judicial office holder (namely, sheriff principal or sheriff); as opposed to using temporary judges who were practising advocates or solicitor-advocates. Lord Gill's guidance allows for such judges to be allocated to any first instance business of the High Court, but requires the approval of the Lord Justice General for their deployment in the Appeal Court.

=== Removal from office ===
The Lord Justice General, Lord Justice Clerk and the Lords Commissioners of Justiciary can only be removed office after a tribunal has been convened to examine their fitness for office. The tribunal is convened at the request of the Lord Justice General (in his capacity as Lord President) or in other circumstances if the First Minister sees fit. However, the First Minister must consult the Lord Justice General (or the Lord Justice Clerk, if the Lord Justice General is under investigation). Should the tribunal recommend their dismissal the Scottish Parliament can resolve that the First Minister make a recommendation to the Monarch.

=== Principal Clerk of Session and Justiciary ===
The administration of the court is part of the Scottish Courts and Tribunals Service, and is led by the Principal Clerk of Session and Justiciary. The Principal Clerk is responsible for the administration of the Supreme Courts of Scotland and their associated staff. As of April 2017 the Principal Clerk was Graeme Marwick, who was also Director of the Scottish Courts and Tribunals Service.

== See also ==
- William Roughead, between 1889 and 1949 attended every murder trial of significance held in the Court.
- List of leading Scottish legal cases
- Lord Advocate's Reference
