= Court of Session =

Supreme civil court of Scotland

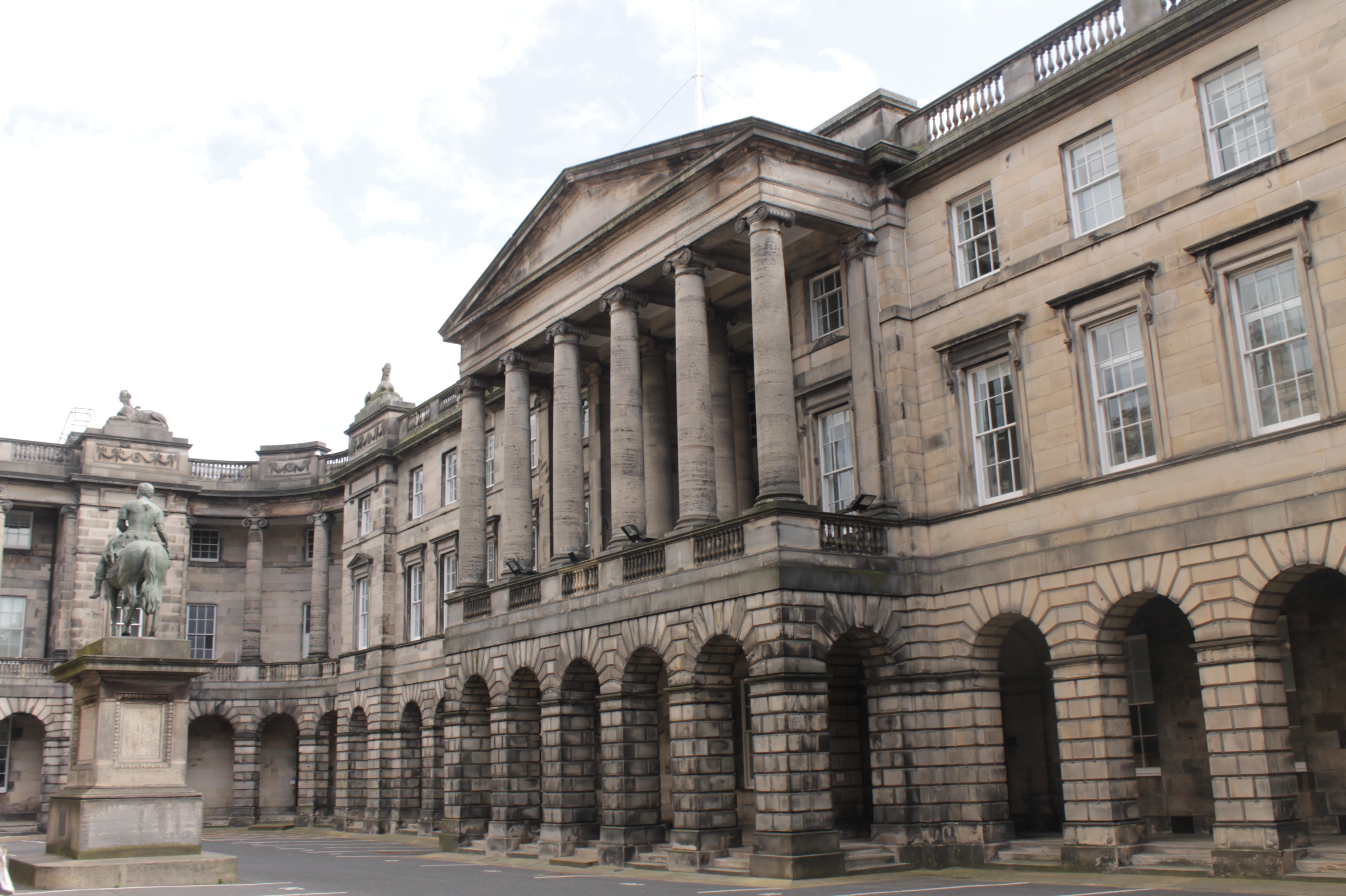
- Scottish version of the Royal Coat of Arms as used by the Courts in Scotland Parliament House, Edinburgh which houses the Court of Session
- Interactive map of Court of Session
- Established: 1532; 494 years ago
- Location: Parliament House, Edinburgh, Scotland
- Composition method: Executive selection from practising lawyers and judges
- Authorised by: College of Justice Act 1532; Acts of Union 1707; Court of Session Act 1988; Courts Reform (Scotland) Act 2014
- Appeals to: UK Supreme Court
- Appeals from: Its own Outer House; Sheriff courts; Various tribunals
- Website: scotcourts.gov.uk

Lord President
- Currently: Lord Pentland
- Since: 3 February 2025

The Court of Session (Note: Scottish Gaelic: Cùirt an t-Seisein) is the highest national court of Scotland in relation to civil cases. The court was established in 1532 to take on the judicial functions of the royal council. Its jurisdiction overlapped with other royal, state and church courts but as those were disbanded, the role of the Court of Session ascended.

The Acts of Union which relinquished the Kingdom of Scotland’s independence and established the Kingdom of Great Britain on 1 May 1707 provided that the court will "remain in all time coming" as part of Scotland's separate legal system. Cases at first instance are heard in the Outer House by a single judge. The Inner House hears appeals from the Outer House and all other courts and tribunals in Scotland. Only Scottish advocates and solicitor-advocates may argue cases before the court. The Court of Session has sat at Parliament House since 1707. The Scottish Courts and Tribunals Service and the Principal Clerk administers the court and judges.

Decisions of the court are subject to review by both the UK Supreme Court and the European Court of Human Rights and on appeal, the UK Supreme Court can overturn them altogether. Early judges of the court recorded their decisions and codified the law at a time early in the development of Scots law, leading to the development and distinct character of Scots law. In modern times, the court has ruled on issues of public importance and proceedings of its Inner House have been streamed and recorded since 2023. The court now hears cases from any part of Scotland on any issue, other than criminal cases, which belong to its sister court, the High Court of Justiciary.

The Court of Session is the Royal Court of Scotland, hearing civil cases in the name of the Monarch. Judges are termed Lords of Council and Session and appointed simultaneously to the College of Justice and the High Court of Justiciary. Their number is fixed by statute, currently to 37, although a number of temporary judges assist the court with its workload. The court is led by the Lord President of the Court of Session who also heads the Scottish judiciary.

== History ==
=== Establishment of the court ===
The creation of the court was part of wider efforts to improve and reform access to justice in Scottish society. By 1153, the local feudal courts had been established. Depending on the part of Scotland where the cause originated, justice might also be available from the local baron or lord of regality, sitting with the king's authority. Parties often found these courts ineffectual. Appeal of the decisions of local courts lay to the king and the Lords of Council, sitting together as the King's Council, or the Parliament of Scotland. The burden on these bodies of hearing appeals led to a growing effort to divest their judicial functions.

James I decided that a Session would be held periodically to hear appeals and decide cases. It came to be known as the Auld Session and sat three times a year, comprising the Lord Chancellor and "certain discreet persons of the Three Estates" as the Lords of Session. The Sessions had universal jurisdiction to hear disputes formerly arguable to the king's Council. According to the Stair Memorial Encyclopedia, they were so named because the Sessions were "a court and[…] the term 'session' was used to distinguish this new court from the royal court which was peripatetic, whereas the Session sat at such places as the king appointed."

By 1438, the Session was convening only yearly and it ceased altogether at a time between 1457 and 1468, with its function transferring back to the king's council and decided by the Lords of Council. The voluntary and unpaid nature of the office of Lord of Session was likely responsible for the Auld Session's failure. The work of the Session continued under the auspices of the king's council and in 1491, an act proclaimed that "the Chancellor with certain Lords of Council or else the Lords of Session sit for the administration of justice thrice each year… so that justice may be put to due execution to all parties complaining".

These sittings, or 'sessions', became more regular. Edinburgh was fixed as the location for the sessions, addressing a frustrating feature of the royal courts – litigants would summon an opponent to appear at one place on one date, but by that day the king may have decided to move onto another location. The summons would fail and the litigant would have to spend considerable money both following the court and issuing a fresh summons. The Lords of Council and the Lords of Session became commingled, and the modern court's judges are still styled Lords of Council and Session.

In 1531, it was decided to create a permanent, dedicated, national court of Scotland. James V obtained a papal bull in 1531 and established the College of Justice in 1532, basing it on the Parisian parlement. The council lords became members of the College of Justice and judges of the new Court of Session. The Lord Chancellor of Scotland presided over the court.

The court began providing free access to a lawyer, the advocatus pauperum, in 1534. Initially, the court's judiciary numbered fourteen and was split evenly between clerics and laymen. Judges were at first selected by the king and council, but the court grew anxious at the quality of those selected, and from 1579 nominees had to be confirmed by the existing judges.

=== Early operation ===
On its founding, the court had jurisdiction over "all civil actions". Consistorial and succession causes were moved from the church courts to the Court of Session after the Reformation. As the court's jurisdiction grew, it began to direct that smaller causes be heard in the local courts, with the Court of Session acting as an appeal court. The court also developed the doctrine of nobile officium under which it had an inherent power to provide a remedy for any injustice not already provided for by Scots law. Scots law did not develop a distinction between its common law and equitable principles partly due to the nobile officium.

The Courts Act 1672 allowed for five of the Lords of Session to be appointed as Lords Commissioners of Justiciary, and as such becomes judges of the High Court of Justiciary. The High Court of Justiciary is the supreme criminal court of Scotland. Previously the Lord Justice General, the president of the High Court, had appointed deputes to preside in his absence. From 1672 to 1887, the High Court consisted of the Lord Justice General, Lord Justice Clerk, and five Lords of Session.

In 1640, membership of the court was restricted to laymen only, by withdrawing the right of churchmen to sit in judgement of legal causes. The number of laymen was increased to maintain the number of lords in the court.

=== Towards the modern day ===
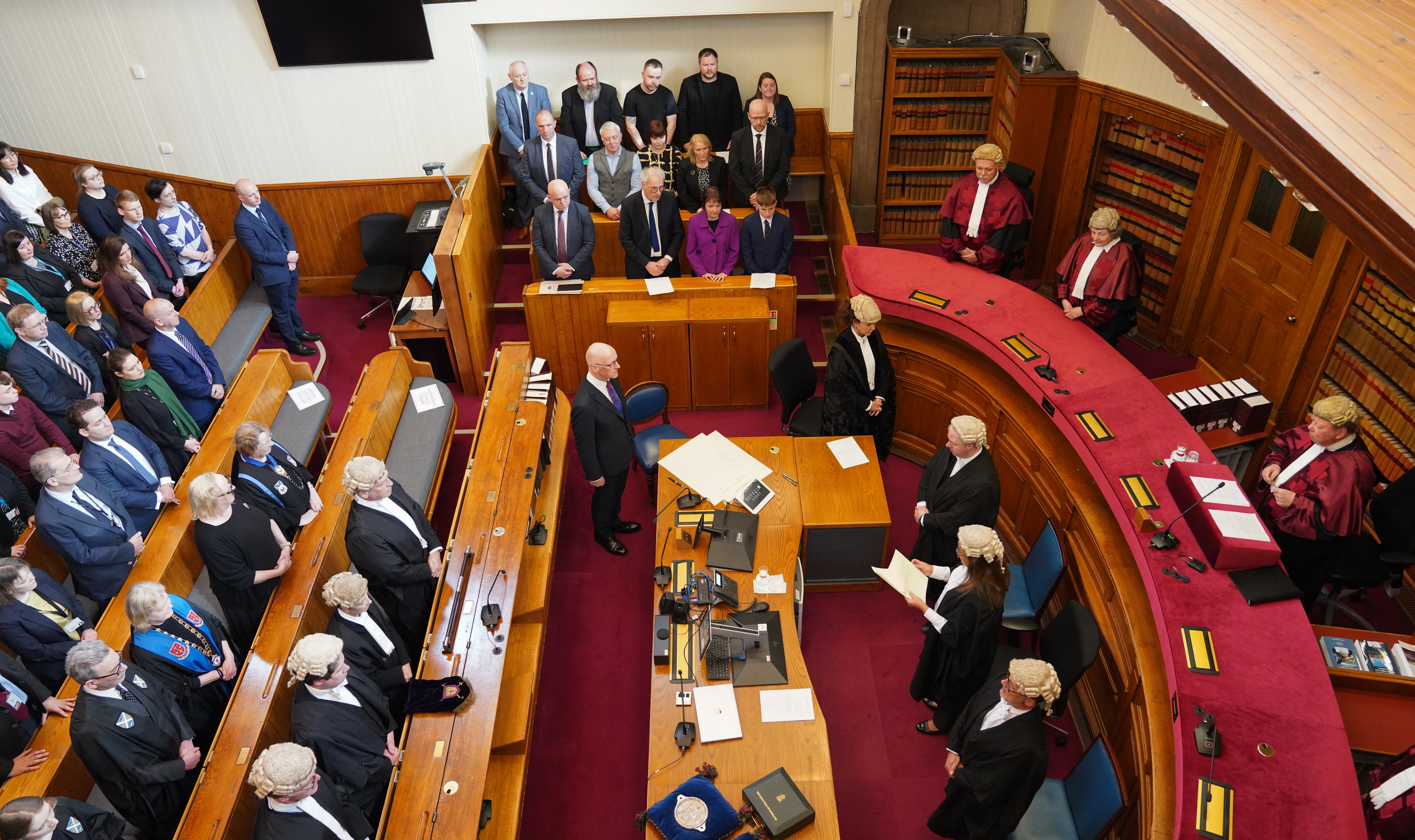
Sitting of five judges of the Court of Session (dressed in red on the right, two out of picture), not hearing a case but rather administering the oath of allegiance to a new First Minister for Scotland

The Court of Session is explicitly preserved "in all time coming" in Article XIX of the Treaty of Union between England and Scotland, subsequently passed into legislation by the Acts of Union in 1706 and 1707 respectively. The office of Extraordinary Lord of Session was abolished in 1762. Outer House judges continue to be addressed in the Inner House as "the Lord Ordinary", a remnant of the historical distinction between the Extraordinary Lords of Session and the other or 'Ordinary' ones.

Several significant changes were made to the court during the 19th century, with the Court of Session Act 1810 formally dividing the Court of Session into the Outer House (with first-instance jurisdiction before a Lord Ordinary) and Inner House (with appellate jurisdiction.) Cases in the Outer House were to be heard by Lords Ordinary who either sat alone or with a jury of twelve. Cases in the Inner House were to be heard by three Lords of Council and Session, but significant or complicated cases were to be heard by five or more judges. A further separation was made in 1815, by the Jury Trials (Scotland) Act 1815 (55 Geo. 3. c. 42), with the creation of a lesser Jury Court to allow certain civil cases to be tried by jury. In 1830 the Jury Court, along with the Admiralty and Commissary courts, was absorbed into the Court of Session following the enactment of the Court of Session Act 1830.

In 1834, the remuneration and working conditions were a matter of public discussion and debate in the House of Commons. On 6 May 1834 Sir George Sinclair addressed the House of Commons to plead for an increase in the salaries of the senators, noting that "a Civil Judge in the Supreme Court in Scotland received only £2,000" and the masters in the Court of Chancery were paid £2,500. A select committee was appointed to investigate the matter.

In October 1834, The Spectator reported on the conflicting views around the remuneration and working conditions of the judges of the Court of Session, with conflicting views being presented in response to the Report on the Scotch Judges' Salaries. The Spectator reported the arguments made by Sir William Rae, Lord Advocate, that the judges of the Court of Session had considerable duties, which he listed as:

On those thirteen are now devolved, first, all the duties that occur in the Court of Chancery in England; second, all the duties that occur in the courts of Common Law in England, in civil matters; third, all the duties that devolve on the courts of Common Law in England as connected with criminal matters, including a large portion of those done in Quarter-sessions, inasmuch as the Sheriffs, who are the next in rank to the Justiciary Judges, are held incompetent to try any case when the punishment amounts to that of transportation; fourth, all the duties of the Court of Exchequer, (the remaining Judges of that Court having by a subsequent act been abolished); fifth, all the duties connected with bankruptcy; sixth, a set of duties unknown in England, connected with the valuation and sale of tithes, and the augmentation of ministers' stipends out of the tithes—the tribunal for disposing of such matters it known by the name of the Teind Court; seventh, the duties connected with the Court of Admiralty, and the duties connected with the Consistorial Courts.

— Sir William Rae, Evidence to Select Committee on Judges' Salaries (Scotland)

The select committee recommended that the salaries of the Lord President, Lord Justice Clerk and remaining senators should be increased, and also recommended that all senators should become Lords Commissioners of Justiciary. The committee recommended salaries of £3,000 for Senators (equivalent to £337,132 in 2025), £5,300 for the Lord President, and £5,000 for the Lord Justice Clerk. (Note: These amounts were to be increases from £2,000 for Senators, £4,300 for the Lord President, and £4,000 for the Lord Justice Clerk.) However, The Spectator was very critical of the actual amount of work done by the judges of the court, noting that there was much public criticism of their effectiveness and that the judges were entitled to 7 months' vacation each year. The Spectator also asserted that civil justice was out of the reach of the poor in Scotland.

In 1887, all of the Lords of Session were made Lords Commissioners of Justiciary, and thus judges of the High Court of Justiciary, following the passage of the Criminal Procedure (Scotland) Act 1887 (50 & 51 Vict. c. 35).

== Work ==
Decisions of the Court of Session are influential or binding on all the courts of Scotland, and the court handles all manner of civil business, from commercial and contract disputes to family and taxation. Appeal lies to Supreme Court of the United Kingdom and may be taken only with the permission of either court. The Court of Session and the local sheriff courts of Scotland have concurrent jurisdiction for all cases with a monetary value in excess of £100,000; the pursuer is given first choice of court. The majority of complex, important, or high value cases are brought in the Court of Session. The sheriff courts and Sheriff Personal Injury Court may remit cases to the Court of Session at the presiding sheriff's request.

=== Civil cases ===
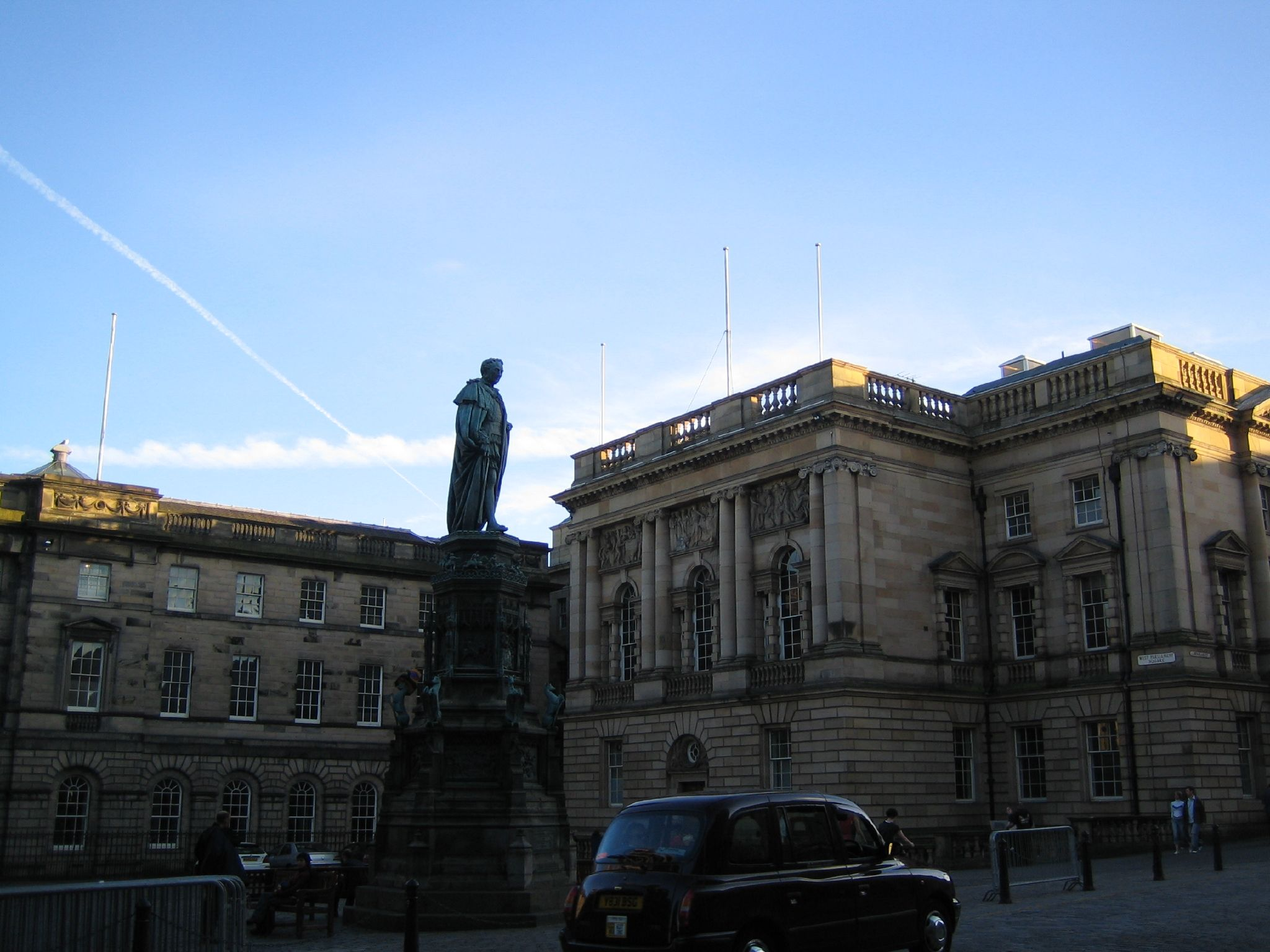
Parliament House, Edinburgh, in Parliament Square, houses the Court of Session

The Court of Session is the supreme civil court of Scotland, and it shares concurrent jurisdiction with the local sheriff courts over all cases with a value of more than £100,000 (including personal injury claims.) Where a choice of jurisdiction exists between the Court of Session and the sheriff courts, including the Sheriff Personal Injury Court, it is for the pursuer to decide which court to raise the action in. The court sits in Parliament House in Edinburgh and is both a trial court and a court of appeal.

=== Exchequer cases ===
The primary task of the Court of Session is to decide on civil law cases. The court is also the Court of Exchequer for Scotland, a jurisdiction previously held by the Court of Exchequer. (In 1856, the functions of that court were transferred to the Court of Session, and one of the Lords Ordinary sits as Lord Ordinary in Exchequer Causes when hearing cases therein.) This was restated by the Court of Session Act 1988.

=== Admiralty cases ===
The Court of Session is also the admiralty court for Scotland, having been given the duties of that court by the provisions of the Court of Session Act 1830. The boundaries of the jurisdiction of the Court of Session in maritime cases were specified in 1999 by an Order in Council: the Scottish Adjacent Waters Boundaries Order 1999.

=== Nobile officium ===
The jurisdiction of the Court of Session extends beyond statutory and common law powers, with the Court having an equitable and inherent jurisdiction called the nobile officium, unique among British courts. The nobile officium enables the court to provide a legal remedy where statute or the common law are silent, and to prevent mistakes in procedure or practice that would lead to injustice. The exercise of this power is limited by adherence to precedent, and when legislation or the common law do not already specify the relevant remedy. Thus, the court cannot set aside a statutory power, but can deal with situations where the law is silent, or where there is an omission in statute. Such an omission is sometimes termed a casus improvisus.

The nobile officium was used to implement recognition of an order of the High Court of Justice of England and Wales for the placement of children in secure accommodation in Scotland, in the case of Cumbria County Council, Petitioners [2016] CSIH 92. An application was made to the Court of Session under the nobile officium by Cumbria County Council, Stockport Metropolitan Council, and Blackpool Borough Council on behalf of four children. There was insufficient accommodation in England to house the children, so the councils sought to place them in suitable Scottish accommodation. However, legislation was silent on the cross-border jurisdiction of such orders as made by the High Court of Justice. Nonetheless, equivalent orders made by a Scottish court were enforceable in England and Wales. Thus, the Court of Session found, using its inherent powers, that the orders could be applied as though they had been issued by the Court of Session itself.

In September 2019 UK Prime Minister Boris Johnson said that he would "rather be dead in a ditch" than apply for an extension to Britain's application to leave the European Union (Brexit), due on 31 October, although the UK parliament had required him to do so under circumstances laid out in the Benn Act. Following this, an application was made to the Court of Session to require the Prime Minister to sign a letter requesting extension if no exit deal could be agreed in time. The applicants hoped that the unique power of nobile officium would enable the court to send the article 50 extension letter on Johnson's behalf, if he declined to do so.

=== Appellate jurisdiction ===
Appeals in the Court of Session are generally heard by the Inner House before three judges, although in important cases in which there is a conflict of authority a court of five judges or, exceptionally, seven, may be convened. The Inner House is sub-divided into two divisions of equal authority and jurisdiction - the First Division, headed by the Lord President; and the Second Division headed by the Lord Justice Clerk. The courts to hear each case are, ordinarily, drawn from these divisions. When neither is available to chair a hearing, an Extra Division of three senators is summoned, chaired by the most senior judge present; due to pressure of business the Extra Division sits frequently nowadays.

Until 2015 civil cases that went to a full proof (hearing) in the sheriff courts of Scotland could be appealed by right to the Inner House of the Court of Session. Appellants could take the appeal to a sheriff principal for an initial appeal, and then onto the Inner House, or they could take the appeal directly to the Inner House. However, the appellate jurisdiction of sheriffs principal for all civil cases (including summary cause and small claims actions) was transferred to the Sheriff Appeal Court following passage of the Courts Reform (Scotland) Act 2014. The 2014 Act also modified the appellate jurisdiction of the Inner House with civil appeals from the sheriff courts being heard by an appeal sheriff sitting in the Sheriff Appeal Court. Such appeals are binding on all sheriff courts in Scotland, and appeals can only be remitted (transferred) to the Inner House where they are deemed to be of wider public interest, raise a significant point of law, or are particularly complex:

... the rationale for the establishment of the Sheriff Appeal Court, that it will deal with virtually all civil appeals from the sheriff court because these do not merit the attention of Inner House judges except in very exceptional cases. This will free up Inner House judges to deal with more complex matters.

— Paragraph 133, Policy Memorandum, Courts Reform (Scotland) Bill, Scottish Government

=== Oath of Allegiance ===
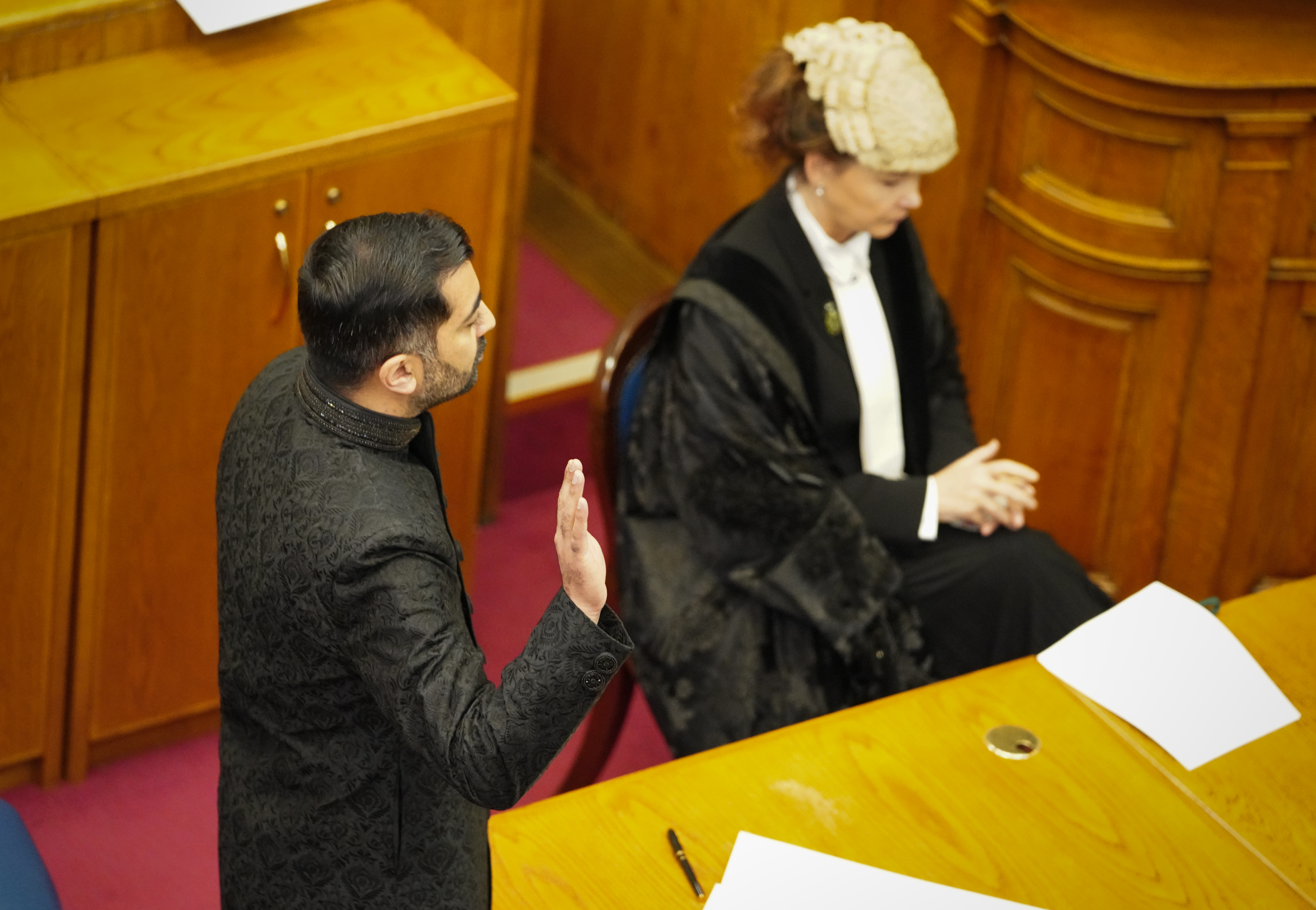
First Minister Humza Yousaf takes the Oath of Allegiance in the presence of the Lord Advocate, the chief legal officer of the Scottish Government and the Crown in Scotland.

The Oath of Allegiance is taken by holders of political office in Scotland before the Lord President of the Court of Session at a meeting of the court.

=== Acts of Sederunt ===
Civil procedure in Scotland is regulated by the Court of Session through Acts of Sederunt, which are subordinate legislation and take legal force as Scottish statutory instruments. The power to enact Acts of Sederunt is granted by the Courts Reform (Scotland) Act 2014 and the Tribunals (Scotland) Act 2014, which replaced powers regulated by the Court of Session Act 1988 and the Sheriff Courts (Scotland) Act 1971. These are generally incorporated into the Rules of Court, which are published by the Scottish Courts and Tribunals Service and form the basis for Scots civil procedure.

Acts of Sederunt regulate civil procedure in the Court of Session, the sheriff courts of Scotland (including the Sheriff Appeal Court and Sheriff Personal Injury Court), and in the tribunals of Scotland. The Court of Session can amend or repeal any enactment, including primary legislation, if it relates to matters an Act of Sederunt may cover. Rules for regulating civil procedure are decided upon by the Scottish Civil Justice Council before being presented to the Lords of Session for decision; the Lords of Session may approve, amend or reject the rules so presented.

An Act of Sederunt, Act of Sederunt (Regulation of Advocates) 2011, devolves authority to the Faculty of Advocates to regulate admission to practice as an advocate before the Court of Session and the High Court of Justiciary; advocates are notionally officers of the court, and are de jure appointed by the court.

== Structure ==
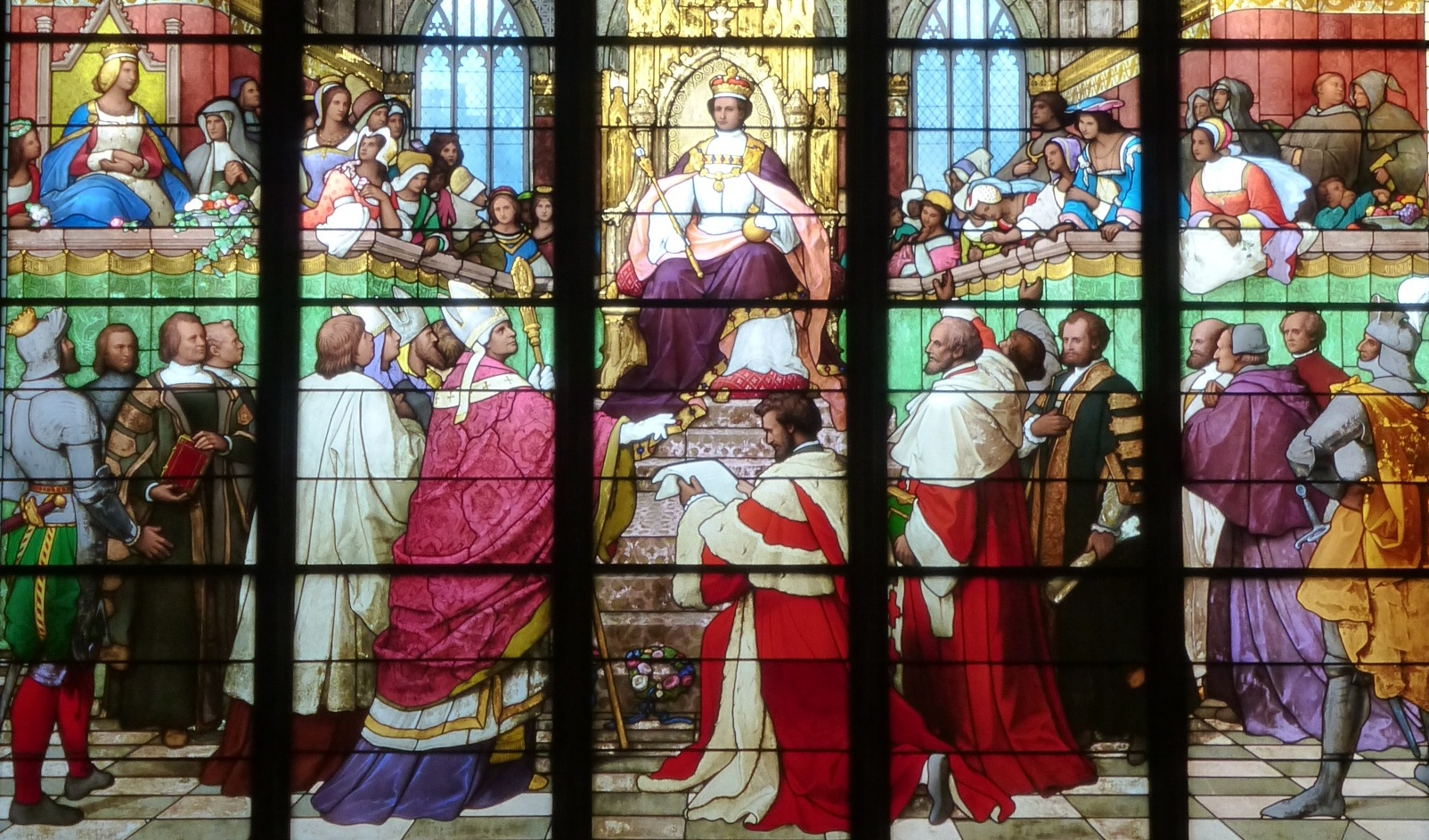
Institution of the Court of Session by James V in 1532, detail from the Great Window in Parliament House, Edinburgh. "The first Session was begun by Gavin Dunbar, Archbishop of Glasgow; Alexander Myln, Abbot of Cambuskenneth, Lord President; Master Richard Bothuile, Rector of Ashkirk; Sir John Dingwell, Provost of the Church of the Holy Trinity, near Edinburgh; Master Henry Quhyte, Rector of the Church of Finhaven; Master William Gibson, Dean of the Collegiate Church of Restlerig; Master Thomas Hay, Dean of the Collegiate Church of Dunbar, all elected by our Sovereign Lord the King." -- W Forbes-Leith, Pre-Reformation Scholars in Scotland in the 16th century, 1915

The court is divided into the Inner House of twelve senators, which is primarily an appeal court, and the Outer House, which is primarily a court of first instance. The Inner House is further divided into divisions of six senators: the first division, presided over by the Lord President, and second division, presided over by the Lord Justice Clerk. Cases in the Inner House are normally heard before a bench of three senators, though more complex or important cases are presided over by five senators. On very rare occasions the whole Inner House has presided over a case. Outer House cases are heard by a single senator sitting as a Lord Ordinary, occasionally with a jury of twelve.

The current Lord President is Lord Carloway. In addition to the 35 senators, a number of temporary judges have been appointed to the court, typically from serving sheriffs and sheriffs principal or advocates in private practice.

=== Inner House ===
The Inner House is the senior part of the Court of Session, and is both a court of appeal and a court of first instance. The Inner House has historically been the main locus of an extraordinary equitable power called the nobile officium – the High Court of Justiciary has a similar power in criminal cases. Criminal appeals in Scotland are handled by the High Court of Justiciary sitting as the Court of Appeal.

The Inner House is the part of the Court of Session which acts as a court of appeal for cases decided the Outer House and of civil cases from the sheriff courts, the Court of the Lord Lyon, Scottish Land Court, and the Lands Tribunal for Scotland. The Inner House always sits as a panel of at least three senators and with no jury.

Unlike in the High Court of Justiciary, there is a right of appeal to the Supreme Court of the United Kingdom of cases from the Inner House. The right of appeal only exists when the Court of Session grants leave to this effect or when the decision of the Inner House is by majority. Until the Constitutional Reform Act 2005 came into force in October 2009, this right of appeal was to the House of Lords (or sometimes to the Judicial Committee of the Privy Council).

=== Outer House ===
The Outer House is a court of first instance, although some statutory appeals are remitted to it by the Inner House. Such appeals are originally referred from the sheriff courts, the court of first instance for civil causes in the court system of Scotland. Judges in the Outer House are referred to as Lord or Lady [name], or as Lord Ordinary. The Outer House is superficially similar to the High Court in England and Wales, and in this house judges sit singly—and with a jury of twelve in personal injury or defamation actions. Subject-matter jurisdiction is extensive and extends to all kinds of civil claims unless expressly excluded by statute, and it shares much of this jurisdiction with the sheriff courts. Some classes of cases, such as intellectual property disputes, are heard by an individual judge designated by the Lord President as the jurist for intellectual property cases.

Final judgments of the Outer House, as well as some important judgements on procedure, may be appealed to the Inner House. Other judgments may be so appealed with leave.

=== Other sittings ===
The court sits as the Lands Valuation Appeal Court is a Scottish civil court, composed of three Court of Session judges, and established under Section 7 of the Valuation of Lands (Scotland) Amendment Act 1879. It hears cases where the decision of a local Valuation Appeal Committee is disputed. The senators who make up the Lands Valuation Appeal Court was specified in 2013 by the Act of Sederunt (Lands Valuation Appeal Court) 2013, which has both Lord Carloway (Lord President) and Lady Dorrian (Lord Justice Clerk) as members with a further four senators specified.

== Administration ==
=== Legal aid ===
Legal aid, administered by the Scottish Legal Aid Board, is available to persons with little disposable income for cases in the Court of Session.

=== Rights of audience ===
Members of the Faculty of Advocates, known as advocates or counsel, and as of 1990 also some solicitors, known as solicitor-advocates, have practically exclusive rights of audience in the court. Barristers from England and Wales have no right of audience, which caused controversy in 2011 (over an appeal from an immigration tribunal) and again in 2015 (over an appeal from a tax tribunal) when barristers recognised by the General Council of the Bar were denied the right to take an appeal on behalf of clients they had represented at tribunal.

=== Principal Clerk ===
The administration of the court is part of the Scottish Courts and Tribunals Service, and is led by the Principal Clerk of Session and Justiciary. She is responsible for the administration of the Supreme Courts of Scotland and their associated staff. Gillian Prentice has been the Principal Clerk since June 2018.

== Judges ==
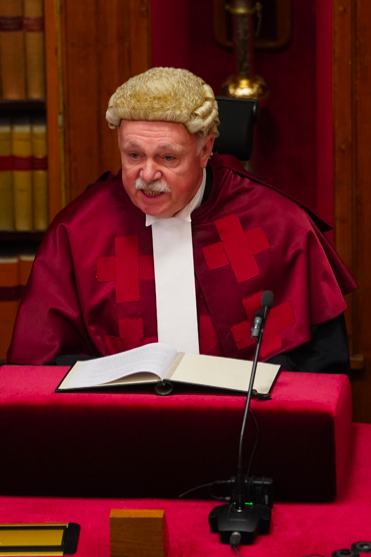
Lord Pentland, current Lord President of the Court of Session

The court's president is the Lord President, the second most senior judge is the Lord Justice Clerk, with a further 33 senators of the College of Justice holding office as Lords of Council and Session. The total numbers of judges is fixed by Section 1 of the Court of Session Act 1988, and subject to amendment by Order in Council. Judges are appointed for life, subject to dismissal if they are found unfit for office, and subject to a compulsory retirement age of 75. Temporary judges can also be appointed.

The court is a unitary collegiate court, with all judges other than the Lord President and the Lord Justice Clerk holding the same rank and title—Senator of the College of Justice and also Lord or Lady of Council and Session. There are thirty-four judges, in addition to a number of temporary judges; these temporary judges are typically sheriffs, or advocates in private practice. The judges sit also in the High Court of Justiciary, where the Lord President is called the Lord Justice General.

=== Appointment and removal ===
To be eligible for appointment as a senator, or temporary judge, a person must have served at least five years as sheriff or sheriff principal, been an advocate for five years, a solicitor with five years rights of audience before the Court of Session or High Court of Justiciary, or been a Writer to the Signet for ten years (having passed the exam in civil law at least two years before application). Appointments are made by the King on the recommendation of the First Minister of Scotland who receives recommendations from the Judicial Appointments Board for Scotland. The Judicial Appointments Board has a statutory authority for making recommendations under Sections 9 to 27 of the Judiciary and Courts (Scotland) Act 2008 (as amended by the Courts Reform (Scotland) Act 2014). Appointments to the Inner House are made by the Lord President and Lord Justice Clerk, with the consent of the Scottish Ministers.

The Lord President, Lord Justice Clerk and other senators can be removed from office after a tribunal has been convened to examine their fitness for office. The tribunal is convened on the request of the Lord President, or in other circumstances that the First Minister sees fit. However, the First Minister must consult the Lord President (for all other judges) and the Lord Justice Clerk (when the Lord President is under investigation.) Should the tribunal recommend their dismissal the Scottish Parliament can resolve that the First Minister make a recommendation to the Monarch.

=== Lord President ===
The Lord President is the most senior judge of the Court of Session, and is also president of the First Division of the Inner House. The Lord Justice Clerk is the second most senior judge of the Court of Session, and deputises for the Lord President when the Lord President is absent, unable to fulfil his duties, or when there is a vacancy for Lord President. The Lord Justice Clerk is president of the 2nd Division of the Inner House.

=== Inner House ===
The Lord President is the president of the First Division, and the Lord Justice Clerk is the president of the Second Division.

	Senator	Mandatory retirement	Inner House appointment	Outer House appointment	Division
1	The Rt Hon. Lord Pentland (Lord President of the Court of Session and Lord Justice General)	11 March 2032	July 2020	November 2008	First
2	The Rt Hon. Lord Beckett (Lord Justice Clerk)	2037	1 July 2023	17 May 2016	Second
3	The Rt Hon. Lord Malcolm	1 October 2028	1 July 2014	2007	Second
4	The Rt Hon. Lord Matthews	4 December 2028	August 2021	2007	Second
5	The Rt Hon. Lord Tyre	17 April 2031	5 January 2022	May 2010	First
6	The Rt Hon. Lady Wise	22 January 2033	5 January 2022	6 February 2013	First
7	The Rt Hon. Lord Clark	3 December 2030	23 September 2024	24 May 2016	First
8	The Rt. Hon. Lord Ericht	12 September 2038	3 February 2025	31 May 2016	First
9	The Rt. Hon. Lady Carmichael	26 November 2044	3 February 2025	30 June 2016	Second
10	The Rt. Hon. Lord Mulholland	18 April 2034	1 February 2026	15 December 2016	Second
11	The Rt. Hon. Lord Arthurson	16 December 2039	1 February 2026	17 March 2017	First
12	The Rt. Hon. Lord Braid	6 March 2033	1 July 2026	22 June 2020	Second

=== Outer House ===
	Senator	Mandatory retirement	Appointment
13	The Hon. Lord Brailsford	16 August 2029	2006
14	The Hon. Lord Summers	27 August 2039	17 March 2017
15	The Hon. Lord Fairley	20 February 2043	13 January 2020
16	The Hon. Lady Poole	11 August 2045	13 January 2020
17	The Hon. Lord Harrower		17 February 2020
18	The Hon. Lord Weir	21 Feb 2042	6 April 2020
19	The Hon. Lord Sandison	30 May 2041	1 March 2021
20	The Hon. Lady Haldane		1 March 2021
21	The Hon. Lord Richardson	26 August 2049	1 March 2021
22	The Hon. Lady Drummond	19 December 2042	16 May 2022
23	The Hon. Lord Young		16 May 2022
24	The Hon. Lord Lake		16 May 2022
25	The Hon. Lord Scott		16 May 2022
26	The Hon. Lord Stuart	24 April 2041	16 May 2022
27	The Hon. Lord Colbeck		19 May 2023
28	The Hon. Lord Cubie		17 June 2024
29	The Hon. Lady Hood		17 June 2024
30	The Hon. Lord Renucci		17 June 2024
31	The Hon. Lady Ross		17 June 2024
32	The Hon. Lady Tait		5 February 2025
33	The Hon. Lady Anwar		2 September 2026
34	The Hon. Lord Ewing		2 September 2026
35	The Hon. Lord Ghosh		3 September 2026
36	The Hon. Lady O'Neill		4 September 2026

== See also ==
- Bill Chamber
- Office of the Accountant of Court
- Senators of the College of Justice
- Historic list of senators of the College of Justice
- List of Scottish legal cases
