= Aisha Yaqoob Anwar =

Scottish judge

The Honourable Lady Anwar KC (Hon)

Senator of the College of Justice
- Incumbent
- Assumed office 2 September 2026
- Nominated by: John Swinney; As First Minister
- Appointed by: Charles III

Sheriff Principal of Glasgow and Strathkelvin
- In office 19 May 2023 – 24 August 2026
- Preceded by: Craig Turnbull, Lord Colbeck

Sheriff Principal of South Strathclyde, Dumfries and Galloway
- In office April 2020 – June 2023
- Preceded by: Ian R. Abercrombie, KC
- Succeeded by: Kate Dowdalls KC

Personal details
- Education: University of Edinburgh; University of Oxford
- Profession: Solicitor; Judge

Aisha Yaqoob Anwar KC is a Senator of the College of Justice in Scotland. Lady Anwar is the first person of Pakistani heritage and first woman of colour to be appointed to the office.

== Early career ==
Anwar graduated from the University of Edinburgh in 1996 with a Bachelor of Laws with Honours and from the University of Oxford in 1998 with a Bachelor of Civil Law. Anwar began her career as a Trainee Solicitor at Scottish law firm Maclay Murray & Spens being admitted as a Solicitor in 2000. Between 2009 and 2012 she served as a partner and Head of Litigation for Scotland at a global commercial firm, specialising in complex commercial dispute resolution.

== Judicial service ==
Anwar was appointed as a Part-time Sheriff in 2011 and then became a full time resident Sheriff at Glasgow Sheriff Court in 2014. She was appointed as Sheriff Principal of South Strathclyde, Dumfries and Galloway in 2020 before moving to the Sheriffdom of Glasgow and Strathkelvin in March 2023 as its Sheriff Principal.

In 2017, Sheriff Anwar’s letter to the children involved in a contact dispute, which explained her decision in plain simple language, attracted a great deal of interest (Patrick v Patrick), being described as “the Scottish Courts at their best”. The letter featured in a performance of Letters Live, during the Edinburgh International Festival.

On 10 May 2023, it was announced that Anwar was to succeed Sheriff Principal Marysia Lewis as president of the Sheriff Appeal Court with effect from 1 August 2023. She remained in that post until her elevation as a Senator of the College of Justice, being replaced by Sheriff Principal Gillian Wade KC.

On 4 September 2024 it was announced that Anwar was to be among the first in Scotland to appointed as King's Counsel honoris causa

It was announced on 30 June 2026 that Anwar was among five people appointed to the office of Senator of the College of Justice and would therefore sit in the Court of Session and High Court of Justiciary, Scotland's supreme civil and criminal courts. Anwar was installed on 2 September 2026.
