= Lady Drummond =

Lady Drummond may refer to:

- Claudia Schiffer, Lady Drummond (born 1970), German model
- Lorna Drummond, Lady Drummond (born 1967), Scottish lawyer and Senator of the College of Justice
- Grace Marguerite, Lady Hay Drummond-Hay (1894–1946), British journalist
- Margaret Drummond (died 1501), British noblewoman and mistress of James IV of Scotland
- Wives of the Marquesses of Drummond
- Wives of the Lords Drummond of Cargill
- Wives of the Lords Drummond of Stobhall
- Wives of the Lords Drummond of Cromlix
- Wives of the Lords Drummond of Gilstoun
- Wives of the Lords Drummond of Riccartoun
