= Duncan Menzies, Lord Menzies =

Scottish judge

The Right Honourable Lord Menzies
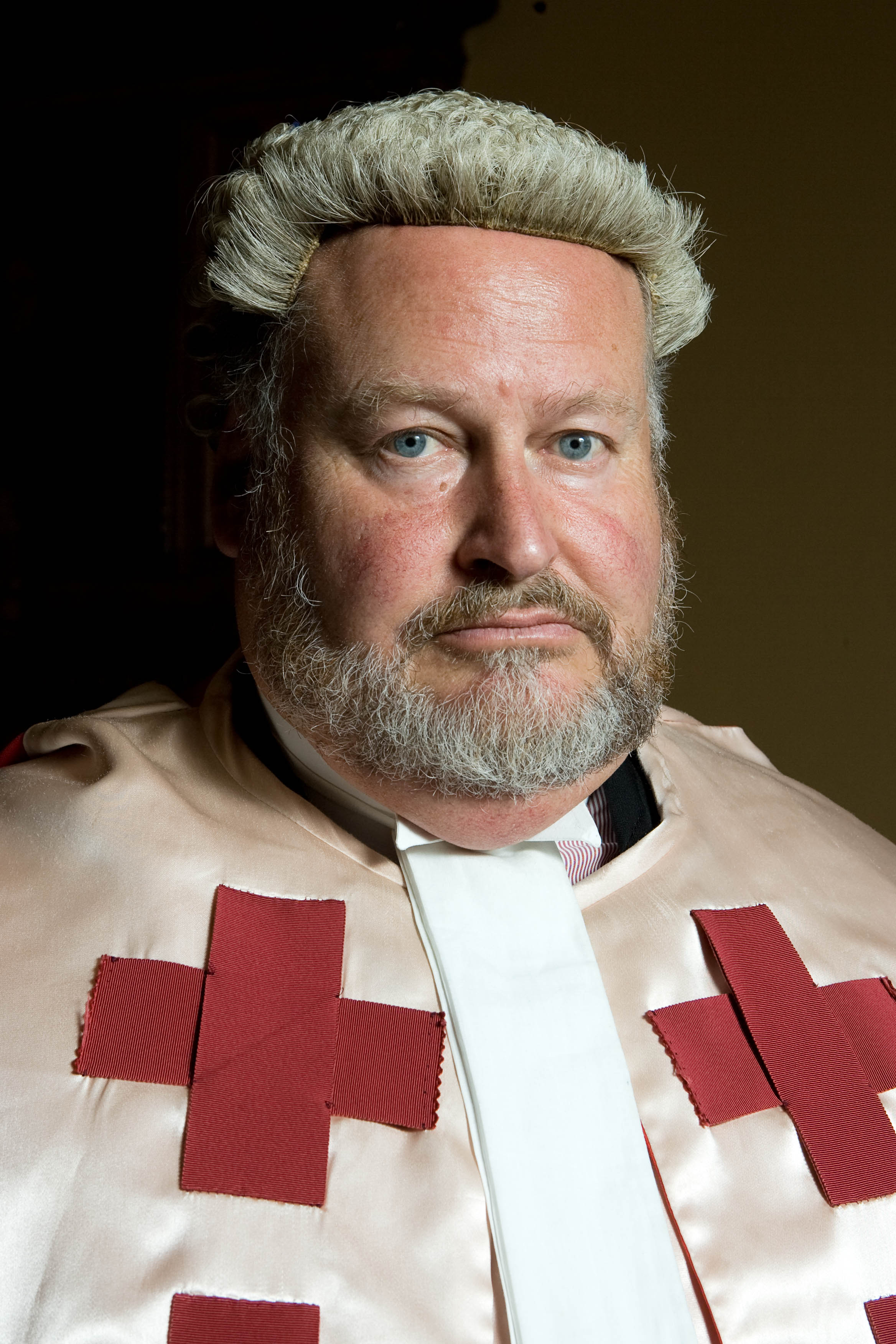

Senator of the College of Justice
- In office 2001–2021
- Nominated by: Henry McLeish; As First Minister
- Monarch: Elizabeth II

Personal details
- Born: Duncan Adam Young Menzies; 28 August 1953 (age 73)
- Party: Conservative
- Education: Wadham College, Oxford; University of Edinburgh
- Profession: Advocate

Duncan Adam Young Menzies, Lord Menzies, PC (born 28 August 1953) is a judge of the Supreme Courts of Scotland. He was appointed to the Outer House of the Court of Session in 2001, and the Inner House (Scotland's main appellate court) in 2012.

== Early life ==
Menzies was educated at the private Cargilfield Preparatory School in Edinburgh, before obtaining a scholarship to Glenalmond College, Perthshire. He achieved a further scholarship to study at Wadham College, University of Oxford (MA), and then studied at the School of Law of the University of Edinburgh (LLB). He was admitted to the Faculty of Advocates in 1978 and from 1984 to 1991 was Standing Junior Counsel to the Admiralty. He took silk in 1991. He stood as the Conservative candidate for Midlothian in 1983, and for Edinburgh Leith in 1987, but was unsuccessful both times.

== Legal career ==
He served as a Temporary Sheriff from 1996 to 1997, and as Chairman of the Scottish Planning, Local Government and Environmental Bar Group from 1997 to 2001. He was appointed an Advocate Depute in January 1998, replacing Alan Turnbull QC, and became Home Advocate Depute in September that year, replacing Alastair Campbell, who resigned to concentrate on his role in the Pan Am Flight 103 bombing trial. Menzies served in this role until December 2000.

Menzies was appointed a Senator of the College of Justice, a judge of the Court of Session and High Court of Justiciary, Scotland's supreme courts, in July 2001, taking the judicial title Lord Menzies. He sat as the presiding judge in the Angelika Kluk murder case. Menzies was promoted to the Inner House in 2012 and received the customary appointment to the Privy Council.

== Personal life ==
Lord Menzies married Hilary Elizabeth McLauchlan Weston in 1979, with whom he has two sons. His interests include shooting, golf and wine, and he is a member of the von Poser Society of Scotland, the Saintsbury Club, the New Club and the Honourable Company of Edinburgh Golfers, and a founding member of the Scottish Wine Society. He lives in Edinburgh.

== See also ==
- List of Senators of the College of Justice
