= Colin Tyre, Lord Tyre =

Scottish lawyer and judge

The Right Honourable Lord Tyre CBE

Senator of the College of Justice
- Incumbent
- Assumed office 2010
- Monarch: Elizabeth II

President of the Council of Bars and Law Societies of Europe
- In office 2007–2007
- Preceded by: Manuel Cavaleiro Brandão
- Succeeded by: Peter Köves

Personal details
- Born: Colin Jack Tyre; 17 April 1956 (age 70)
- Education: University of Edinburgh; University of Aix-Marseille
- Profession: Advocate

Colin Jack Tyre, Lord Tyre, CBE, PC (born 17 April 1956) is a Scottish lawyer, former President of the Council of Bars and Law Societies of Europe, and a Senator of the College of Justice, a judge of the Supreme Courts of Scotland.

== Early life ==
Tyre studied at the School of Law of the University of Edinburgh and took a postgraduate diploma at the University of Aix-Marseille before returning to Edinburgh as a lecturer from 1980 to 1983. He was admitted as an advocate in 1987 and served as Standing Junior Counsel (legal advisor) to the Procurement Executive of the Ministry of Defence from 1991 to 1995 and to the Environment Department of the Scottish Office from 1995 to 1998. He was appointed Queen's Counsel in 1998.

== Legal career ==
From 2003 to 2009, Tyre was a part-time member of the Scottish Law Commission, and in 2007 was elected President of the Council of Bars and Law Societies of Europe. In April 2010, he was appointed a Senator of the College of Justice, a judge of the Court of Session and High Court of Justiciary, the Supreme Courts of Scotland, taking the judicial title, Lord Tyre. He was awarded a CBE in the 2010 Birthday Honours for services to the administration of justice.

On 7 December 2021, it was announced that Tyre would be appointed to the Inner House of the Court of Session with effect from 5 January 2022.

On 13 April 2022, he was appointed to Her Majesty's Privy Council.

== Personal life ==
Tyre is a widower; his wife Elaine, who was Director of Professional Legal Studies at the University of Edinburgh School of Law, died in December 2010.

Tyre has three children, Kirsty, Catriona and Euan and lives near Dunbar in East Lothian. He enjoys hillwalking and orienteering and is a member of the Dunbar Golf Club.

On Saturday 15 June 2024 he "topped out", climbing his 282nd and final Munro, Beinn na Lap.
