= Neil Brailsford, Lord Brailsford =

British judge

The Honourable Lord Brailsford

Senator of the College of Justice
- Incumbent
- Assumed office 2006
- Nominated by: Jack McConnell; As First Minister
- Monarch: Elizabeth II
- Preceded by: Lord Hamilton

Personal details
- Born: Sidney Neil Brailsford; 15 August 1954 (age 72) Tore Nursing Home, Edinburgh
- Spouse: Elaine Nicola Robbie
- Children: 3
- Education: University of Stirling, University of Edinburgh, Daniel Stewart's College
- Profession: Advocate

Sidney Neil Brailsford, Lord Brailsford (born 15 August 1954) is a Senator of the College of Justice, a judge of Scotland’s Supreme Courts.

== Early life ==
Brailsford was educated at Daniel Stewart's College, Edinburgh, and studied at the University of Stirling (B.A.) and the School of Law of the University of Edinburgh (LL.B.). He was called to the Bar in 1981.

== Legal career ==
Brailsford's initial practice at the Bar was mostly in the civil courts, later developing a specialism in insurance. He was appointed Queen's Counsel in 1994, and an Advocate Depute in 1999, serving until 2000, at which time he was elected Treasurer of the Faculty, holding that position for one year. He was appointed a judge of the Court of Session and High Court of Justiciary, Scotland's Supreme Courts, in 2006. His appointment filled the vacancy created by Lord Hamilton's appointment as Lord President. He sits in the outer house. On 27 October 2022 it was announced that Lord Brailsford would chair the public inquiry into the Scottish Government's response to the Covid 19 pandemic.

== See also ==
- List of Senators of the College of Justice
