= Anna Poole, Lady Poole =

Scottish judge

The Honourable Lady Poole

Senator of the College of Justice
- Incumbent
- Assumed office 10 January 2020
- Nominated by: Nicola Sturgeon; As First Minister
- Appointed by: Elizabeth II

President of the Administrative Appeals Chamber of the Upper Tribunal
- Incumbent
- Assumed office 9 February 2026
- Appointed by: Lord Justice Dingemans; As Senior President of Tribunals
- Preceded by: Mrs Justice Heather Williams

Personal details
- Education: Madras College
- Alma mater: Somerville College, Oxford
- Profession: Judge

The Honourable Anna Isabel Poole, Lady Poole (born 11 August 1970) is a Senator of the College of Justice in Scotland and President of the Upper Tribunal (Administrative Appeals Chamber). Poole was educated at Madras College, St Andrews, and at Somerville and Magdalen Colleges, Oxford.

== Early career ==
Poole graduated with first class honours from the University of Oxford in Law in 1991 (BA Jurisprudence, MA). She completed a postgraduate Masters in 1993 (M.St, Oxon), and went on to qualify as a solicitor in England and Wales in London in 1996. After returning to Scotland, she became a Scottish solicitor in 1997 and an advocate in 1998. She was appointed as a Standing Junior Counsel to the Scottish Government in 2002, Second Standing Junior in 2009, and First Standing Junior in 2010. In 2012, she took silk, becoming Queen's Counsel (now KC). She served as an ad hoc advocate depute in 2013.

== Judicial service ==
In 2014 Poole was appointed as a part-time ("fee-paid") judge of the First Tier Tribunal, a UK-wide tribunal, in the Social Entitlement Chamber, while continuing to practise at the bar. In 2018 she became a full time judge of the Upper Tribunal. She became a judge of the Court of Session and Senator of the College of Justice, a related position, in 2020. Lady Poole was formally installed as a Senator of the College of Justice at a ceremony in Parliament House on 10 January 2020.

In addition to sitting in the Court of Session and the High Court of Justiciary, Poole holds various other judicial appointments; Upper Tribunal for Scotland (2020-), visiting judge of the Employment Appeal Tribunal (2025-), and Chamber President of the Upper Tribunal (Administrative Appeals Chamber) (2026-). She served as chair to the Scottish COVID-19 Inquiry between 14 December 2021 and 27 October 2022 during its set up period. She also chairs the Advisory Council of Messengers-at-Arms and Sheriff Officers.

Lady Poole previously worked at the universities of Dundee and Edinburgh as a research assistant and a tutor respectively. Between 2014 and 2024 she served as Chancellor first for the Diocese of Argyll and the Isles, and then for the Diocese of Edinburgh. She is a Fellow of the Chartered Institute of Arbitrators, after completing a course in arbitration at the University of Aberdeen.

She is a co-author of a book on judicial review (A Practical Guide to Public Law Litigation in Scotland Drummond, McCartney and Poole, 2019) and is a contributor to Court of Session Practice edited by Lord Donald MacFadyen.

On 9 February 2026, Lady Poole succeeded Mrs Justice Heather Williams as President of the Administrative Appeals Chamber of the Upper Tribunal having been appointed by Lord Justice Dingemans with the consent of the Lord President of the Court of Session.
