= Mark Hirst =

Scottish journalist

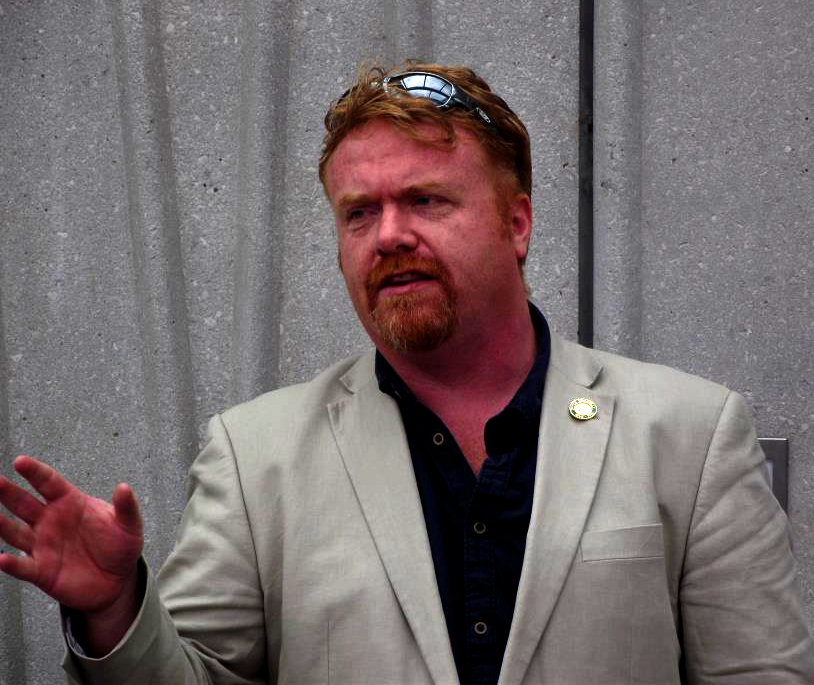
- Mark Hirst speaking outside the Scottish Parliament.
- Born: Scotland
- Occupation: Editor-in-Chief

Mark Hirst is a Scottish journalist. He is a former Editor-in-Chief of Radio Sputnik/Sputnik News UK, formerly RIA Novosti, (Rossiya Segodnya/Russia Today), Russia's largest news organisation. A former broadcast journalist with STV News, he has also produced and appeared in a number of independently-made documentary films.

== Background ==
Hirst has a BA in Communication Studies from Queen Margaret University.

In 2001 Hirst was a communications officer for Orkney Islands Council. In 2003 he was appointed as press officer for the Scottish Children's Reporter Administration.

== Politics ==
Hirst has worked as a staffer for four Scottish National Party politicians including Sandra White and Christine Grahame

== Journalism ==
In August 2004 Hirst was a speaker at the Damien Walsh Memorial Lecture at Queens University Belfast as part of the Féile an Phobail. The event was organised by the Victims and Survivors Trust. Former civil rights leader and journalist Eamonn McCann gave the second part of the lecture focused on the Bloody Sunday Inquiry.

In 2003 Hirst produced and appeared in Histoire d'un naufrage confidentiel (The Story of a Secret Sinking) in association with Atlantic Television and France 3. At the Toulon Film Festival in 2004, a three-day maritime festival in France, it won Best 'International Documentary'. The film subsequently screened in 85 countries. In 2017 Hirst was Associate Producer for an episode of “Combat Ships” broadcast on the History Channel.

In 2005 Hirst co-founded the Lancastria Association of Scotland. In 2008 he successfully petitioned the Scottish Parliament to commission a Commemorative Lancastria Medal, which he designed. In 2012 Hirst was an Associate Producer for the documentary Maritime Mysteries, Case Closed broadcast on the French international channel TV5 Monde. In 2015 Hirst directed a one-hour documentary, The Ablyazov Syndicate, examining an alleged multibillion-dollar fraud of the BTA Bank by its former Chairman Mukhtar Ablyazov.

Hirst has contributed articles to the Scottish Left Review magazine and also the Scots Independent newspaper. A former reporter for Orkney Farmer magazine., Hirst has written for every newspaper in Scotland.

== Arrest, Charges, Trial, Acquittal ==
In March 2020, Mark Hirst released a YouTube video where he said that the legally-protected anonymity of women who had accused Alex Salmond of sexual assault may not be continued and they were "going to reap the whirlwind." When those remarks were criticised by Rape Crisis Scotland, Hirst alleged Rape Crisis Scotland had been directed by the Labour Party. Following an investigation into reports of menacing communication, Hirst was arrested and charged by police in May. At a hearing in August 2020 Hirst pled not guilty to an amended charge that he had acted in a “threatening or abusive manner”. On 8 January 2021, at Jedburgh Sheriff Court, it was ruled that Mark Hirst had no case to answer. SNP MP, Kenny MacAskill, the former Scottish Justice Secretary writing in The Scotsman said the action following the Alex Salmond Trial raised serious questions about Scotland's prosecutors, stating, “This isn't just an abuse of process; it's looking like an abuse of power.” Responding to Hirst's acquittal the President of the Chartered Institute of Journalist, Professor Tim Crook, said, "Mark Hirst is a respected professional journalist and a member of our Institute. Freedom of expression in the UK means that he has the right to exercise his skills with political activism in the media.” Following his acquittal lawyers acting for Hirst confirmed they would sue both the Crown Office and Police Scotland for "malicious prosecution".

On 6 February 2026, Lord Lake, hearing Hirst's malicious prosecution suit in the Outer House of the Court of Session, ruled that he had no choice but to dismiss the action under Section 170 of the Criminal Procedure (Scotland) Act 1995. Under Section 170, the Lord Advocate and Crown Office have effective immunity against being pursued for damages "unless the person suing has suffered imprisonment". However, Lord Lake also declared that provisions of Section 170 were incompatible with Article 6 of the European Convention of Human Rights as an unjustifiable restriction on the pursuer's right to have the merits of his claim determined.
