= Andrew Stewart, Lord Ericht =

Scottish lawyer and judge (born 1963)

The Right Honourable Lord Ericht

Senator of the College of Justice
- Incumbent
- Assumed office 31 May 2016
- Nominated by: Nicola Sturgeon; As First Minister
- Monarchs: Elizabeth II; Charles III

Personal details
- Born: 12 September 1963 (age 63)
- Education: University of Edinburgh
- Profession: Advocate

Andrew Fleming Stewart, Lord Ericht (born 12 September 1963) is a Scottish lawyer who was appointed in 2016 as a Senator of the College of Justice, a judge of the Court of Session.

== Career ==
Stewart was educated at Perth High School and the University of Edinburgh and qualified as a solicitor in 1988. He practised with Clifford Chance and Tods Murray, and served as Legal Assistant to the Lord President of the Court of Session before being admitted as an advocate in 1996. From 2000 to 2009 he was standing junior counsel to the Department of Trade and Industry, and in 2003 he was elected as Clerk of the Faculty of Advocates. He was appointed Queen's Counsel in 2009, and then served as an advocate depute until 2013 when he returned to independent practice in commercial and public law. He has also held part-time appointments as visiting lecturer at the Université de Lorraine, France from 1993 to 2016.

=== Judge ===
In May 2016, Stewart was appointed as a Senator of the College of Justice. He was installed as a judge on 31 May 2016, taking the judicial title Lord Ericht.

== See also ==
- Scots law
- Courts of Scotland
