= Peter Braid, Lord Braid =

Scottish judge

The Right Honourable Lord Braid

Senator of the College of Justice
- Incumbent
- Assumed office 23 June 2020
- Nominated by: Nicola Sturgeon; As First Minister
- Monarchs: Elizabeth II; Charles III

Personal details
- Born: Peter Braid
- Education: University of Edinburgh
- Occupation: Solicitor
- Profession: Lawyer; Judge

Peter Braid, Lord Braid is a Scottish judge who has been a Senator of the College of Justice since 23 June 2020.

== Career ==
Braid graduated from the University of Edinburgh before becoming a solicitor with the Scottish law firm, Morton Fraser. He was appointed as a Sheriff in 2005. In 2015, he was appointed by the Sheriff Principal of Lothian and Borders to be one of several Sheriffs who would sit in the new All-Scotland Personal Injury Court which was established following reforms to the court system in Scotland. Braid was also appointed by the Lord President of the Court of Session to sit as an Appeal Sheriff in the Sheriff Appeal Court upon its creation in 2015.

During the COVID-19 pandemic, Lord Braid declared that regulations made by the Scottish Ministers which required places of worship to close were unlawful, following a judicial review brought by a group of 27 church leaders in Scotland. In 2022, Braid sentenced a former Scottish Queen's Counsel to 10 years' imprisonment in relation to five charges of sexual abuse of children which had occurred in the 1970s and 1980s, describing the offences as being "of the utmost seriousness and depravity."

Braid was a commercial judge from 2021 until May 2025, including acting as the senior commercial judge from 2022. From May 2025 he was the senior family judge in the Court of Session.

On 28 January 2026 it was announced that the Lord President, Lord Pentland, and Lord Justice Clerk, Lord Beckett, had recommended Lord Braid for appointment to the Second Division of the Inner House of the Court of Session with effect from 1 July 2026 replacing Lord Armstrong who was due to retire.
