= Robert Weir, Lord Weir =

Scottish judge

The Honourable Lord Weir

Senator of the College of Justice
- Incumbent
- Assumed office 9 April 2020
- Nominated by: Nicola Sturgeon; As First Minister
- Monarchs: Elizabeth II; Charles III

Personal details
- Born: Robert Bruce Weir
- Education: Durham University (BA); University of Dundee (LLB)
- Occupation: Advocate
- Profession: Lawyer; Judge

Robert Bruce Weir, Lord Weir is a Scottish judge. He has been a Senator of the College of Justice since 9 April 2020.

== Early life and education ==
Weir is the son of Bruce Weir, who was also a Senator of the College of Justice. He was educated at Edinburgh Academy. He graduated from Durham University with a BA in History and obtained his LLB from Dundee University.

== Career ==
Weir joined Scottish law firm of Maclay Murray & Spens as a trainee solicitor in 1992, and was admitted to the Faculty of Advocates in 1995. He practised principally in commercial dispute resolution, with a speciality in maritime law. Wier was an Advocate Depute between 2005 and 2008 and took silk in 2010.

He was appointed as a Sheriff in 2015 sitting in South Strathclyde, Dumfries and Galloway until 2018, at which he was appointed a resident Sheriff at Edinburgh Sheriff Court. He was selected to hear cases in the All Scotland Personal Injury Court located at Edinburgh Sheriff Court. As a Sheriff, Weir determined that a woman had been raped by a man who had earlier been acquitted of rape following a trial in the High Court of Justiciary where the acquittal had been by the controversial not proven verdict. It was the first time in recent legal history in Scotland that a person acquitted of rape had been sued for damages.

Weir was installed as a Senator of the College of Justice in April 2020 taking the judicial title Lord Weir. He had sat as a Temporary Judge of the High Court between 2017 and his appointment as a Senator of the College of Justice. He is a member of the Personal Injury Committee of the Scottish Civil Justice Council, and has served as its chair since November 2023. In March 2024, it was announced that Weir would chair a public inquiry regarding the way in which allegations of misconduct against Sam Eljamel, a brain surgeon, were handled by NHS Tayside.
