= Alistair Clark, Lord Clark =

Scottish lawyer and judge

The Right Honourable Lord Clark PC

Senator of the College of Justice
- Incumbent
- Assumed office 24 May 2016
- Nominated by: Nicola Sturgeon; As First Minister
- Monarch: Elizabeth II

Personal details
- Profession: Advocate

Alistair MacDonald Clark, Lord Clark, PC (born 3 December 1955) is a Scottish lawyer who was appointed in 2016 as a Senator of the College of Justice, a judge of the Court of Session.

== Career ==
Alistair Clark began his career a university lecturer, teaching mostly commercial law and company law. He was admitted as an advocate in 1994, and appointed as a Queen's Counsel in 2008.

In May 2016, Clark was appointed as a Senator of the College of Justice. He was installed as a judge on 24 May 2016, taking the judicial title Lord Clark.

On 6 November 2024, Clark was appointed to the Privy Council following being appointed to the First Division of the Inner House on 23 September 2024.

== See also ==
- Scots law
- Courts of Scotland
