= Craig Sandison, Lord Sandison =

Scottish judge

The Honourable Lord Sandison

Senator of the College of Justice
- Incumbent
- Assumed office 1 March 2021
- Nominated by: Nicola Sturgeon; As First Minister
- Monarchs: Elizabeth II; Charles III

Personal details
- Born: Craig Sandison; 30 May 1966 (age 60)
- Education: University of Aberdeen, University of Edinburgh, University of Glasgow, University of Cambridge
- Occupation: Advocate
- Profession: Lawyer Judge

Craig Robert Kindness Sandison, Lord Sandison (born 30 May 1966) is a Scottish judge who has been a Senator of the College of Justice since 2021.

== Career ==
Sandison graduated from the University of Aberdeen in 1989, with a Bachelor of Laws degree and then from the University of Edinburgh with a Diploma in Legal Practice. He obtained a Diploma in Forensic Medicine from the University of Glasgow. Sandison obtained a master's degree in 1991 and a PhD in 1994, both from the University of Cambridge. He trained with Scottish solicitor's firm Brodies before becoming an Advocate at the Faculty of Advocates in 1996. He became a Queen's Counsel in 2009. It was announced on 4 February 2021 that Sandison had been appointed as a Senator of the College of Justice. He was installed as a Senator of the College of Justice at a ceremony in the Court of Session on 23 February 2021, taking the judicial title of Lord Sandison.

Sandison acted for Wings Over Scotland blogger Stuart Campbell in his defamation action against former Scottish Labour leader and Member of the Scottish Parliament Kezia Dugdale, over a newspaper column she had written. This was the first case to ever be heard by the Inner House of the Court of Session virtually and was done so in the wake of the widespread restrictions imposed in response to the COVID-19 pandemic.

Legal offices
Preceded by	Senator of the College of Justice; 2021–present	Incumbent
