= Paul Arthurson, Lord Arthurson =

Scottish politician

The Right Honourable Lord Arthurson PC KC

Senator of the College of Justice
- Incumbent
- Assumed office 2017
- Nominated by: Nicola Sturgeon; As First Minister
- Appointed by: Elizabeth II

Personal details
- Born: 16 December 1964 (age 61)
- Education: University of Edinburgh, Oxford
- Profession: Advocate

Paul Andrew Arthurson, Lord Arthurson (born 16 December 1964) is a Senator of the College of Justice, appointed in March 2017. He previously served as a sheriff, since 2005, and a temporary judge of the Court of Session, since 2013. He is a graduate of the University of Edinburgh. He was admitted to the Faculty of Advocates in 1991 and was appointed Queen's Counsel (QC) in Scotland in 2005

On 28 January 2026 it was announced that The Lord President and Lord Justice Clerk had recommended Lord Arthurson for appointment to the First Division of the Inner House of the Court of Session with effect from 1 February 2026.

Arthurson was appointed to the Privy Council in June 2026.

In 2026 he notably spared a violent child rapist from prison due to the perpetrator's Huntington's Disease.
