= Senator of the College of Justice =

Type of judge in Scotland

The senators of the College of Justice in Scotland are judges of the College of Justice, a set of legal institutions involved in the administration of justice in Scotland. There are three types of senator: Lords of Session (judges of the Court of Session); Lords Commissioners of Justiciary (judges of the High Court of Justiciary); and the Chairman of the Scottish Land Court. Whilst the High Court and Court of Session historically maintained separate judiciary, these are now identical, and the term senator is almost exclusively used in referring to the judges of these courts.

Senators of the college use the judicial courtesy title of Lord or Lady along with a surname or a territorial name. Note, however, that some senators have a peerage title, which would be used instead of the senatorial title. All senators of the college have the honorific, The Honourable, before their titles, while those who are also privy counsellors or peers have the honorific, The Right Honourable. Senators are made privy counsellors upon promotion to the Inner House, the senior part of the Court of Session.

Under section 11 of the Treason Act 1708, it is treason to kill a senator of the College of Justice "sitting in Judgment in the Exercise of their Office within Scotland".

== History ==
Henry Lauder, Lord St Germains, King's Advocate, was one of the nine advocates appointed at the institution of the College of Justice.

Originally, some officers of state were included as senators, including the Lord Advocate, Lord Clerk Register, Master of Requests and the Secretary of State.

== List of senators ==
The Court of Session Act 1988, when enacted, limited the number of senators of the College of Justice (aside from the chairman of the Scottish Land Court, who ranks as a senator) to 24. This was subsequently increased to 25 in 1991, 27 in 1993, 32 in 1999, 34 in 2004, 35 in 2016, and most recently 36 by The Maximum Number of Judges (Scotland) Order 2022. The current judges are as follows.

=== Inner House ===
The Lord President is the president of the First Division, and the Lord Justice Clerk is the president of the Second Division.

	Senator	Mandatory retirement	Inner House appointment	Outer House appointment	Division
1	The Rt Hon. Lord Pentland (Lord President of the Court of Session and Lord Justice General)	11 March 2032	July 2020	November 2008	First
2	The Rt Hon. Lord Beckett (Lord Justice Clerk)	2037	1 July 2023	17 May 2016	Second
3	The Rt Hon. Lord Malcolm	1 October 2028	1 July 2014	2007	Second
4	The Rt Hon. Lord Matthews	4 December 2028	August 2021	2007	Second
5	The Rt Hon. Lord Tyre	17 April 2031	5 January 2022	May 2010	First
6	The Rt Hon. Lady Wise	22 January 2033	5 January 2022	6 February 2013	First
7	The Rt Hon. Lord Clark	3 December 2030	23 September 2024	24 May 2016	First
8	The Rt. Hon. Lord Ericht	12 September 2038	3 February 2025	31 May 2016	First
9	The Rt. Hon. Lady Carmichael	26 November 2044	3 February 2025	30 June 2016	Second
10	The Rt. Hon. Lord Mulholland	18 April 2034	1 February 2026	15 December 2016	Second
11	The Rt. Hon. Lord Arthurson	16 December 2039	1 February 2026	17 March 2017	First
12	The Rt. Hon. Lord Braid	6 March 2033	1 July 2026	22 June 2020	Second

=== Outer House ===
	Senator	Mandatory retirement	Appointment
13	The Hon. Lord Brailsford	16 August 2029	2006
14	The Hon. Lord Summers	27 August 2039	17 March 2017
15	The Hon. Lord Fairley	20 February 2043	13 January 2020
16	The Hon. Lady Poole	11 August 2045	13 January 2020
17	The Hon. Lord Harrower		17 February 2020
18	The Hon. Lord Weir	21 Feb 2042	6 April 2020
19	The Hon. Lord Sandison	30 May 2041	1 March 2021
20	The Hon. Lady Haldane		1 March 2021
21	The Hon. Lord Richardson	26 August 2049	1 March 2021
22	The Hon. Lady Drummond	19 December 2042	16 May 2022
23	The Hon. Lord Young		16 May 2022
24	The Hon. Lord Lake		16 May 2022
25	The Hon. Lord Scott		16 May 2022
26	The Hon. Lord Stuart	24 April 2041	16 May 2022
27	The Hon. Lord Colbeck		19 May 2023
28	The Hon. Lord Cubie		17 June 2024
29	The Hon. Lady Hood		17 June 2024
30	The Hon. Lord Renucci		17 June 2024
31	The Hon. Lady Ross		17 June 2024
32	The Hon. Lady Tait		5 February 2025
33	The Hon. Lady Anwar		2 September 2026
34	The Hon. Lord Ewing		2 September 2026
35	The Hon. Lord Ghosh		3 September 2026
36	The Hon. Lady O'Neill		4 September 2026

=== Chairman of the Scottish Land Court ===
The chairman of the Scottish Land Court has the same rank and tenure as a judge of the Court of Session but does not count towards the maximum number of judges permitted in the Court of Session.

	Senator	Mandatory retirement	Appointment
1	The Hon. Lord Duthie	27 June 2050	9 January 2023

== Retired judges ==
There are also some retired judges who still sit occasionally in the Court of Session or the Court of Criminal Appeal to hear cases if needed when there is a shortage of available judges. They are also called senators of the College of Justice. As of July 2026, the following retired judge are available to sit:

	Senator	Becomes ineligible to act as a judge	Appointment	Retirement
1	The Hon. Lady Paton	2027	2000	31 December 2025
2	The Hon. Lord Woolman	16 May 2028	March 2008	May 2023
3	The Hon. Lord Menzies	28 August 2028	July 2001	2021
4	The Rt. Hon. Lord Carloway	20 May 2029	February 2000	February 2025
5	The Rt. Lord Bannatyne	August 2029	5 November 2008	2020
6	The Rt. Hon. Lady Smith	16 March 2030	2001	
7	The Rt. Hon. Lord Turnbull	2032	2006	
8	The Rt. Hon. Lady Dorrian	26 June 2032	February 2000	February 2025
9	The Hon. Lady Scott	2035	2012	2020
10	The Hon. Lord Armsrtong	26 May 2031	2012	2026

== See also ==
- Historic list of senators of the College of Justice
- Justice of the Supreme Court of the United Kingdom
- List of judges of the Court of Appeal of England and Wales
- List of High Court judges of England and Wales
