= John Scott (Scottish judge) =

Scottish judge

The Honourable Lord Scott

Senator of the College of Justice
- Incumbent
- Assumed office 18 May 2022
- Nominated by: Nicola Sturgeon; As First Minister
- Monarchs: Elizabeth II; Charles III

Personal details
- Born: John Scott
- Education: University of Glasgow
- Occupation: Solicitor
- Profession: Lawyer; Judge

John Scott, Lord Scott is a Scottish judge who has been a Senator of the College of Justice since 18 May 2022. He is the first Solicitor Advocate to be appointed directly to the office of Senator of the College of Justice.

== Career ==
Lord Scott graduated from the University of Glasgow and qualified as a solicitor in 1987. In 2001, Lord Scott became a Solicitor Advocate, gaining extended rights of audience allowing him to appear before the High Court of Justiciary. He was appointed (then) Queen's Counsel in 2011.

In 2013, Scott acted in the unsuccessful attempt by David Gilroy, who was convicted for the Murder of Suzanne Pilley, to have his case referred by the High Court of Justiciary to the Supreme Court of the United Kingdom, this followed his appeal to the Appeal Court of the High Court of Justiciary being refused. In 2016, Scott was elected President of the Society of Solicitor Advocates.

In 2018, the then Scottish Justice Secretary Michael Matheson appointed Scott to lead an independent review into the impact of policing during the 1984–1985 United Kingdom miners' strike in Scotland's communities. In 2019, Scott was appointed by the Scottish Government to chair a review of the legislation covering people who have issues with their mental health. In 2020, Scott was commissioned by the then Chief Constable of Police Scotland to review how Police Scotland were using emergency powers granted to them under legislation enacted to deal with the COVID-19 pandemic.

In 2023, Lord Scott sentenced Isla Bryson, a transgender woman, for rapes committed in 2016 and 2019.

On 24 April 2025, it was announced that Lord Scott would chair a public inquiry into the investigations into the murder of Emma Caldwell.
