= Alan Summers, Lord Summers =

Scottish lawyer (born 1964)

The Honourable Lord Summers

Senator of the College of Justice
- Incumbent
- Assumed office 2017
- Nominated by: Nicola Sturgeon; As First Minister
- Appointed by: Elizabeth II

Personal details
- Education: Dundee, Oxford, Edinburgh
- Profession: Advocate

Alan Andrew Summers, Lord Summers (born 27 August 1964) is a Scottish lawyer and judge.

== Biography ==
He is a graduate of the universities of Dundee, Oxford (St. Catherine's College) and Edinburgh. He lectured in the Department of Scots Law, at the University of Edinburgh, and then trained for the Scottish bar. He was called to the bar in 1994. He was appointed a Standing Junior to the Scottish Government in 2000. In 2007 became Special Counsel to the UK Government and acted for the UK Foreign and Commonwealth Office in the "Lockerbie" appeal (Megrahi v HMA). In 2008 he became Queens Counsel. At the senior bar he appeared in a number of appeals to the UK Supreme Court including Royal Bank of Scotland v Wilson and Cadder v HMA. He specialised in insolvency, property and commercial law. Between 2008 and 2012 he was Chairman of Faculty Services Ltd, the service company of the Scottish bar. In 2012 he was elected Treasurer of the Faculty of Advocates.

He was appointed a Senator of the College of Justice by Her Majesty the Queen on the advice of the First Minister, Nicola Sturgeon and installed in April 2017. He was appointed to be the Scottish judge in the Employment Appeal Tribunal on 1 January 2019.
