= Jonathan Lake, Lord Lake =

Scottish judge

The Honourable Lord Lake

Senator of the College of Justice
- Incumbent
- Assumed office 18 May 2022
- Nominated by: Nicola Sturgeon; As First Minister
- Appointed by: Elizabeth II

Personal details
- Profession: Advocate

Jonathan Lake, Lord Lake KC is a Senator of the College of Justice in Scotland who was appointed as a Senator in May 2022.

== Biography ==
In April 2023, one of Lord Lake's rulings received media attention for the sentence he passed onto a convicted rapist. Sean Hogg was not given a custodial sentence and instead given 270 hours of unpaid work. Lord Lake's ruling received some criticism, with a deputy Crown agent at the Crown Office and Procurator Fiscal Service calling it "unduly lenient". The man was later acquitted after an appeal.

On 6 February 2026, Lord Lake issued a declaration of incompatibility under the European Convention of Human Rights towards Section 170 of the Criminal Procedure (Scotland) Act 1995. Hearing a malicious prosecution suit brought by the journalist Mark Hirst towards the Lord Advocate and Crown Office in the Court of Session, Lake ruled that he had no choice but to dismiss the action as the Lord Advocate and Crown Office have effective immunity against being pursued for damages under Section 170 of the 1995 Act, "unless the person suing has suffered imprisonment". However, Lord Lake also declared that provisions of Section 170 were incompatible with Article 6 of the European Convention of Human Rights as an unjustifiable restriction on the pursuer's right to have the merits of his claim determined.
