= Iain Armstrong, Lord Armstrong =

Scottish advocate and judge

The Right Honourable Lord Armstrong FRSE PC

Senator of the College of Justice
- Incumbent
- Assumed office 15 February 2013
- Nominated by: Alex Salmond; As First Minister
- Appointed by: Elizabeth II

Personal details
- Education: University of Glasgow
- Profession: Advocate

Iain Gillies Armstrong, Lord Armstrong (born 26 May 1956) is a Senator of the College of Justice, a judge of the Supreme Courts of Scotland.

== Legal career ==
Iain Armstrong is a graduate of the University of Glasgow. He was called to the Scottish Bar in 1986. He served as standing junior counsel to the Department of Social Security from 1998 to 2000, when he was appointed a Queen's Counsel. Thereafter, he served as a full-time Advocate Depute in the Crown Office until 2003, when he returned to private practice. He was a member of Scotland's Standing Committee on Legal Education from 1995 until 1999. He was a governor of Fettes College from 2001 until 2011. He served as Vice-Dean of the Faculty of Advocates from 2008 until 2013. From 2009 until 2015 he was a member of the Advisory Panel to the School of Law of the University of Glasgow. On 15 February 2013, he was appointed a Senator of the College of Justice. He was elevated to the Inner House in June 2023.

He was sworn into His Majesty's Most Honourable Privy Council on 10 April 2024 as part of the 2024 Special Honours.
