= Douglas Fairley, Lord Fairley =

The Honourable Lord Fairley

Senator of the College of Justice
- Incumbent
- Assumed office 2020
- Nominated by: Nicola Sturgeon; As First Minister
- Appointed by: Elizabeth II

President of the Employment Appeal Tribunal
- Incumbent
- Assumed office 1 February 2025

Personal details
- Education: Glasgow
- Profession: Advocate

John Douglas Fairley, Lord Fairley is a Senator of the College of Justice. He was appointed as a Senator in November 2019.

== Career ==
He was educated at Hutchesons' Grammar School and the University of Glasgow School of Law. He graduated in 1989, with a first class Honours L.L.B and the John McCormick prize. Between 1992 and 1998 he was a solicitor. He became an advocate in 1999 and Queen's Counsel in 2012.

He served as an Employment Judge between 2010 and 2011 and as an Advocate Depute from 2011 to 2015.

In 2016 he defended criminal proceedings against one of the former Administrators of Rangers football club.

In 2018, he made the news in representing Transport Initiatives Edinburgh in the Edinburgh Tram Inquiry, with his remarks reported by the BBC and the Times. He also received some public attention for his work as advocate for Rangers Group.

Lord Fairley was formally installed as a Senator on 9 January 2020 in a ceremony in Court One of Parliament House, Edinburgh.

In September 2020, he was nominated by the Lord President to be a part-time Judge of the Employment Appeal Tribunal. On 15 January 2025, it was announced that the Lady Chief Justice of England and Wales had appointed Fairly as President of the Employment Appeal Tribunal with effect from 1 February 2025.

He married Una Frances Doherty KC in 2000.
