= Sean Smith, Lord Harrower =

Scottish judge

The Honourable Lord Harrower

Senator of the College of Justice
- Incumbent
- Assumed office 18 February 2020
- Nominated by: Nicola Sturgeon; As First Minister
- Monarchs: Elizabeth II, Charles III

Personal details
- Born: Sean Smith
- Education: University of Glasgow
- Occupation: Advocate
- Profession: Lawyer Judge

Sean Smith, Lord Harrower is a Scottish judge who has been a Senator of the College of Justice since February 2020.

== Career ==
Harrower was educated at Flora Stevenson's and at Broughton High School, Edinburgh. He was a fellow and lecturer in law at Emmanuel College, Cambridge between 1991 and 1996. He graduated from the University of Glasgow becoming an Advocate at the Faculty of Advocates in 1999. At the Bar, he specialised in tax and related matters. He was, at various times, Standing Junior Counsel to the Scottish Government, HM Revenue and Customs and the Officer of the Advocate General for Scotland. He became a Queen's Counsel in 2012 and continued his practice in revenue matters, but also spent two years as an Advocate Depute from 2017 until 2019. He appeared for the Procurator Fiscal in the Fatal Accident Inquiry into the 2013 Glasgow helicopter crash

On 21 November 2019, it was announced that he would be appointed as a Senator of the College of Justice. In February 2020, he was installed as a Senator of the College of Justice taking the judicial title of Lord Harrower in honour of his late mother. In 2022, Harrower refused a judicial review petition which argued that the Tied Pubs (Scotland) Act 2021 was outwith the legislative competence of the Scottish Parliament. In 2024, Harrower awarded a former director of Rangers Football Club £600,000 after he sued the Lord Advocate for malicious prosecution.

Legal offices
Preceded by	Senator of the College of Justice; 2020-present	Incumbent
