= Shona Haldane, Lady Haldane =

Scottish judge

The Honourable Lady Haldane

Senator of the College of Justice
- Incumbent
- Assumed office 1 March 2021
- Nominated by: Nicola Sturgeon; As First Minister
- Monarchs: Elizabeth II, Charles III

Shona Haldane, Lady Haldane is a Scottish judge who has been a Senator of the College of Justice since 2021.

== Biography ==
Haldane was educated at St George's School, Edinburgh, an all-girls independent school, where she became head girl. She studied law at the University of Edinburgh, graduating in 1987. Having completed her training, she was admitted to the Faculty of Advocates in 1996. She specialised in civil law, including commercial law, personal injury and public law. She took silk as a Queen's Counsel (QC) in 2010.

In February 2021, it was announced that Haldane was to be made a Senator of the College of Justice.

In December 2023, she was the judge who sat on the case about the Gender Recognition Reform (Scotland) Bill in the Outer House of Court of Session, where she ruled that it was lawful for the UK Government to overrule the Scottish Parliament under section 35 of the Scotland Act 1998.
