= Craig Turnbull, Lord Colbeck =

Scottish judge

The Honourable Lord Colbeck

Senator of the College of Justice
- Incumbent
- Assumed office 19 May 2023
- Nominated by: Nicola Sturgeon; As First Minister
- Monarch: Charles III

Sheriff Principal of Glasgow and Strathkelvin
- In office 1 September 2016 – 18 May 2023
- Nominated by: Nicola Sturgeon; As First Minister
- Monarchs: Elizabeth II; Charles III
- Preceded by: Craig Scott KC
- Succeeded by: Sheriff Principal Aisha Anwar KC (Hon)

Sheriff
- In office 2014 – 31 August 2016
- Nominated by: Nicola Sturgeon; As First Minister
- Monarch: Elizabeth II

Personal details
- Born: Craig Douglas Turnbull
- Education: University of Strathclyde
- Occupation: Solicitor
- Profession: Lawyer Judge

Craig Turnbull, Lord Colbeck is a Scottish judge who has been a Senator of the College of Justice since May 2023.

== Career ==
Colbeck, a graduate of the University of Strathclyde, was admitted as a solicitor in 1988 becoming a partner in Scottish law firm MacRoberts in 1997. He served as the Managing partner of MacRoberts from 2011 to 2014. He was appointed as a Part-Time Sheriff in 2011 and then as a Sheriff in 2014 before being appointed as Sheriff Principal of Glasgow and Strathkelvin in 2016.

As Sheriff Principal, Colbeck presided over the Fatal Accident Inquiry into the 2013 Glasgow Helicopter Crash.

On 19 January 2023, it was announced that he had been appointed as a Senator of the College of Justice by King Charles III on the recommendation of Nicola Sturgeon. He took up office on 19 May 2023, taking the judicial title of Lord Colbeck.

In January 2026, Colbeck was appointed as chair of the public inquiry into the death of Sheku Bayoh, replacing Lord Bracadale who resigned in October 2025 amid concerns regarding his impartiality.

Legal offices
Preceded by Stephen Woolman, Lord Woolman	Senator of the College of Justice; 2023–present	Incumbent
