= Lorna Drummond, Lady Drummond =

Scottish lawyer

The Honourable Lady Drummond

Senator of the College of Justice
- Incumbent
- Assumed office 2022
- Nominated by: Nicola Sturgeon; As First Minister
- Appointed by: Elizabeth II

Personal details
- Born: 19 December 1967 (age 58)
- Education: Glasgow University; University of Cambridge
- Profession: Advocate

Lorna Allison Drummond, Lady Drummond, KC (born 19 December 1967) is a lawyer, a Senator of the College of Justice in Scotland, and the Justice of Appeal in the Court of Appeal in the Territories of St Helena, Ascension Island and Tristan da Cunha in the South Atlantic. She is a former crown counsel of Ascension Island, in which role, she advised the government on criminal and civil matters.

She was appointed to the Court of Session in May 2022.

== Career ==
Drummond was called to the bar in 1998. She took silk in 2011.

As crown counsel of Ascension Island in the South Atlantic, she was the only qualified lawyer on the island, working in a legal system which relies almost entirely on lay magistrates, lay advocates and lay prosecutors.

On Ascension Island, Drummond organised a "Faculty of Advocates' MiniTrial", which required her to adapt two Scots law cases with "references to local features and places on Ascension" for a case involving an assault which led to severe injury, and involved a knife and the possession of the drug ecstasy with intent to supply.

In 2013, Drummond joined Axiom Advocates, primarily working in public law. In 2015, Drummond was appointed as Justice of Appeal in the Court of Appeal in the Territories of St Helena, Ascension and Tristan da Cunha, having worked in the past on both Ascension Island and St Helena as crown counsel.
