= List of women senators of the College of Justice =

A total of eleven women have been appointed to be senators (judges) of the College of Justice, the Supreme Courts of Scotland established in 1532. The most recent appointment was that of Lady Poole in January 2020, and the most recent retirement was that of Lady Rae later in June, which brought the number of current women judges back to nine.

== History ==
The first woman appointed as a permanent judge of the Court of Session was Hazel Cosgrove, in 1996. She was followed by Ann Paton in 2000, and in November 2001 by Anne Smith. Smith's appointment followed a controversy earlier that year when she and Leeona Dorrian QC were passed over in favour of men; but with only three women out of 32 judges, the Scottish courts were still labelled by The Scotsman newspaper as an "old boys' club".

The appointment in early 2005 of Leeona Dorrian raised the number of women judges to four. Lynda Clark's appointment in early 2006 briefly raised the number to five, but Cosgrove retired from the bench in March 2006. In May 2008, Scotland's first ever all-female bench was formed by Ladies Paton, Smith and Dorrian, who sat together to hear an appeal.

In November 2008, Valerie Stacey's elevation to the bench brought the number of female judges to five. No more women were appointed for another 4 years, but between 2012 and 2014 Maggie Scott, Morag Wise, Rita Rae and Sarah Wolffe brought the total to nine out of 32.

== Appointments ==
Appointed	Senator	Judicial title	Retired	Mandatory retirement date
1996	Hazel Cosgrove	Cosgrove	March 2006	
2000	Ann Paton	Paton	incumbent	2022
2001	Anne Smith	Smith	incumbent	16 March 2025
2005	Leeona Dorrian	Dorrian	incumbent	16 June 2027
2006	Lynda Clark	Clark of Calton	February 2019	
5 November 2008	Valerie Stacey	Stacey	incumbent	25 May 2024
2 November 2012	Maggie Scott	Scott	incumbent	2030
6 February 2013	Morag Wise	Wise	incumbent	
14 January 2014	Rita Rae	Rae	18 June 2020	
11 March 2014	Sarah P. L. Wolffe	Wolffe	incumbent	
30 June 2016	Ailsa Carmichael	Carmichael	incumbent	
10 January 2020	Anna Poole	Poole	incumbent	

== Serving women judges ==
Period start	Event	Number serving	Judges
1532	Creation of College of Justice	0	
1996	Appointment of Hazel Cosgrove	1	Cosgrove
2000	Appointment of Ann Paton	2	Cosgrove, Paton
2001	Appointment of Anne Smith	3	Cosgrove, Paton, Smith
2005	Appointment of Leeona Dorrian	4	Cosgrove, Dorrian, Paton, Smith
February 2006	Appointment of Lynda Clark	5	Clark of Calton, Cosgrove, Dorrian, Paton, Smith
March 2006	Retirement of Lady Cosgrove	4	Clark of Calton, Dorrian, Paton, Smith
5 November 2008	Appointment of Valerie Stacey	5	Clark of Calton, Dorrian, Paton, Smith, Stacey
2 November 2012	Appointment of Maggie Scott	6	Clark of Calton, Dorrian, Paton, Scott, Smith, Stacey
6 February 2013	Appointment of Morag Wise	7	Clark of Calton, Dorrian, Paton, Scott, Smith, Stacey, Wise
14 January 2014	Appointment of Rita Rae	8	Clark of Calton, Dorrian, Paton, Rae, Scott, Smith, Stacey, Wise
11 March 2014	Appointment of Sarah Wolffe	9	Clark of Calton, Dorrian, Paton, Rae, Scott, Smith, Stacey, Wise, Wolffe
30 June 2016	Appointment of Ailsa Carmichael	10	Carmichael, Clark of Calton, Dorrian, Paton, Rae, Scott, Smith, Stacey, Wise, Wolffe
26 February 2019	Retirement of Lynda Clark	9	Carmichael, Dorrian, Paton, Rae, Scott, Smith, Stacey, Wise, Wolffe
10 January 2020	Appointment of Anna Poole	10	Carmichael, Dorrian, Paton, Poole, Rae, Scott, Smith, Stacey, Wise, Wolffe
18 June 2020	Retirement of Rita Rae	9	Carmichael, Dorrian, Paton, Poole, Scott, Smith, Stacey, Wise, Wolffe
