= 2016 in Scotland =

- Centuries: 19th; 20th; 21st
- Decades: 1990s; 2000s; 2010s; 2020s
- See also: List of years in Scotland; Timeline of Scottish history 2016 in: The UK • England • Wales • Elsewhere; Scottish football: 2015–16 • 2016–17; 2016 in Scottish television

Events from the year 2016 in Scotland.

== Incumbents ==
- First Minister and Keeper of the Great Seal – Nicola Sturgeon (reappointed on 18 May 2016)
- Secretary of State for Scotland – David Mundell

=== Law officers ===
- Lord Advocate – Frank Mulholland; then, from 1 June 2016, James Wolffe
- Solicitor General for Scotland – Lesley Thomson; then, from 1 June 2016, Alison Di Rollo
- Advocate General for Scotland – Lord Keen of Elie

=== Judiciary ===
- Lord President of the Court of Session and Lord Justice General – Lord Carloway
- Lord Justice Clerk – vacant until April; then Lady Dorrian
- Chairman of the Scottish Land Court – Lord Minginish

== Events ==
=== January ===
- 1 January – Newly declassified records released by the Scottish Government show the workings of the Scottish Executive's first full year of operation, covering major events throughout the year 2000; including First Minister Donald Dewar's death in office.
- 4 January – As strong winds and heavy rain continue to batter parts of Scotland, with more than thirty flood warnings issued by SEPA, the owner of historic Abergeldie Castle is forced to evacuate the sixteenth century tower house in Aberdeenshire after the River Dee has swept away land behind the properly, leaving it only a few feet from the water.
- 5 January – The new head of Police Scotland is formally sworn in during a ceremony at the Scottish Police College at Tulliallan Castle in Fife.
- 9 January – Scotland's First Minister, Nicola Sturgeon, announces that every household, business or charity in the country directly affected by flood water will receive a grant of £1,500.
- 17 January – For the first time, the typical pay of a Scottish employee has risen above those in England, according to a new study.
- 19 January – The pro-Union Better Together organisation is fined £2,000 by Electoral Commission over referendum spending.

=== February ===
- 8 February – Natural gas from North Sea fields begins to flow from a new plant in Shetland operated by Total.

=== March ===
- 24 March
  - Longannet power station, the last coal-fired power plant in Scotland, is closed.
  - Murder of Asad Shah in Glasgow.

=== April ===
- 7 April – It is announced that the last native person born on the island of St Kilda, Rachel Johnson, has died at the age of 93 at a care home in Clydebank.
- 9 April – Two people are drowned and one is reported missing after the fishing boat Louisa sinks off the coast of the Western Isles.
- 13 April – Lady Dorian is appointed as Lord Justice Clerk in Scotland, succeeding Lord Carloway. She is the first woman to hold the post.

=== May ===
- 5 May – Elections to the Scottish Parliament are held. The Scottish National Party win the election and a third term in government, but fall two seats short of securing an overall majority, whilst the Scottish Conservatives replace Scottish Labour as the main opposition party, with Scottish Conservative leader, Ruth Davidson becoming the Leader of the Opposition.
- 17 May – John Beckett QC installed as a Senator of the College of Justice, with the judicial title Lord Beckett.
- 24 May – Alistair Clark QC installed as a Senator of the College of Justice, with the judicial title Lord Clark.
- 31 May – Andrew Stewart installed as a Senator of the College of Justice, with the judicial title Lord Ericht.

=== June ===
- 20 June – The Judicial Committee of the Privy Council rules that Murray Pringle, an accountant from High Wycombe in Buckinghamshire, England, is the legitimate heir to the baronetcy of Pringle of Stichill, in the Scottish Borders, which was dormant after the death of the 10th Baronet in 2013.

=== August ===
- 8 August – The Transocean Winner oil rig runs aground, at Dalmore beach, in Carloway, on the west side of Lewis. The oil rig was being towed from Norway to Malta, when it became detached from the tugboat.

=== September ===
- September – City Campus, City of Glasgow College, designed by Reiach and Hall Architects and Michael Laird Architects, opens.
- 25 September – The MV Hebrides ferry runs aground at Lochmaddy on North Uist and crashes into the harbour wall.
- 27 September – The first shale gas to be imported to the UK arrives at Ineos's Grangemouth Refinery from the United States; this month also Ineos opens a new headquarters building at Grangemouth.

=== November ===
- 18–26 November – The 2016 European Curling Championships take place in Renfrewshire.

=== December ===
- 15 December – Frank Mulholland appointed as a Senator of the College of Justice as Lord Mulholland, replacing Lord Stewart.

== Deaths ==
- 2 February – Martin Macdonald, Gaelic broadcaster and journalist (born 1937)
- 15 February – Walter McGowan, world champion boxer (born 1942)
- 27 February – Michael Bowes-Lyon, 18th Earl of Strathmore and Kinghorne, peer, soldier and politician (born 1957)
- 28 February – John Cameron, Lord Coulsfield, judge at the Pan Am Flight 103 bombing trial (born 1934)
- 14 March – Sir Peter Maxwell Davies, composer (born 1934 in England)
- 31 March – Ronnie Corbett, actor and comedian (born 1930)
- 6 May – Chris Mitchell, footballer (born 1988)
- 11 May – Joe Temperley, saxophonist (born 1929)
- 3 July – Jimmy Frizzell, footballer and football manager (born 1937)
- 26 July – Maggie Macdonald, singer in Scottish Gaelic (born 1952)
- 19 August – Danus Skene, politician and Chief of Clan Skene (born 1944)
- 30 September – Mike Towell, boxer (born 1991)
- 7 October – Alistair Urquhart, soldier, businessman and author (born 1919)
- 19 October – Valerie Hunter Gordon, inventor of the disposable nappy (born 1921 in England)
- 24 October – Benjamin Creme, artist, author and esotericist (born 1922)

== The arts ==
- May–September – £35m redevelopment of part of the Kelvin Hall in Glasgow opens containing art, cultural and health and fitness activities promoted in a partnership of Glasgow City Council, Glasgow Life, the University of Glasgow and the National Library of Scotland (to incorporate the latter's Moving Image Archive).

== See also ==
- 2016 in England
- 2016 in Northern Ireland
- 2016 in Wales
