= 2017 in Scotland =

- Centuries: 19th; 20th; 21st
- Decades: 1990s; 2000s; 2010s; 2020s
- See also: List of years in Scotland; Timeline of Scottish history 2017 in: The UK • England • Wales • Elsewhere; Scottish football: 2016–17 • 2017–18; 2017 in Scottish television

Events from the year 2017 in Scotland.

== Incumbents ==
- First Minister – Nicola Sturgeon
- Secretary of State for Scotland – David Mundell

=== Law officers ===
- Lord Advocate – James Wolffe
- Solicitor General for Scotland – Alison Di Rollo
- Advocate General for Scotland – Lord Keen of Elie

=== Judiciary ===
- Lord President of the Court of Session and Lord Justice General – Lord Carloway
- Lord Justice Clerk – Lady Dorrian
- Chairman of the Scottish Land Court – Lord Minginish

== Events ==
- 19 January – The Scottish Government sets a target of a 66% reduction in harmful emissions within a fifteen-year timescale
- 16 March – U.K. Prime Minister Theresa May formally rejects Nicola Sturgeon's second Scottish Independence Referendum timetable for Autumn 2018, or at least before Brexit negotiations are concluded.
- 27 April – The population of Scotland reaches a record high, standing at 5,404,700
- 4 May – United Kingdom local elections: Labour is pushed into third place by the Conservatives in Scotland, where the Scottish National Party is comfortably the largest; despite failing to take control of target councils.
- 12 May – WannaCry ransomware attack hits computers in many Scottish National Health Service institutions
- 8 June – The United Kingdom general election results in Scotland see the Scottish National Party re-emerge as the largest single party with 35 seats, but the Conservatives overtake Labour into second place, with Labour being pushed into third place for the first time since the 1918 general election 99 years previously. This is the most successful result for the Conservatives in Scotland since 1983, who gained twelve seats from the SNP. Notable losses included: Former First Minister, Alex Salmond and SNP Depute Leader, Angus Robertson
- 27 June – Nicola Sturgeon announces that she will delay plans for a proposed second Scottish independence referendum
- 19 August – The UK's last postbus runs on the Tongue–Lairg route
- 29 August – Kezia Dugdale resigns as Leader of the Scottish Labour Party after two years in the role
- 30 August – The Queensferry Crossing opens to traffic
- 31 August – STV, Scotland's national broadcaster, celebrates sixty years since its first broadcast
- 2 September – The first of 50,000 people begin their walk on the newly opened Queensferry Crossing; the walk is a "once in a lifetime" chance as the new bridge does not have pedestrian walkways
- 4 September
  - The Queen officially opens the new Queensferry Crossing
  - Rough Guides names Scotland as the world's most beautiful country
- 5 September – First Minister Nicola Sturgeon makes a statement to the Scottish Parliament, outlining the SNP Government's priorities for the coming year, including scrapping the 1% public sector pay cap, implementing of a new Education Bill as well as actions to support the Scottish economy
- 8 September – Phillip Gormley, the Chief Constable of Police Scotland, Scotland's national police force, resigns from the position following allegations of misconduct
- 12 September – Parts of Scotland is hit by torrential rain and gale-force winds, reaching 75 mph in some parts of the country
- 21 September – It is discovered several households in the Glasgow City Council area have similar cladding to that on Grenfell Tower which lead to a serious fire in June 2017; Glasgow City Council has not previously told residents nor the Scottish Fire & Rescue Service
- October – Hywind Scotland, the world's first commercial wind farm using floating wind turbines, is commissioned offshore of Peterhead
- 26 October – Women in Scotland are to be allowed to take abortion pills at home, bringing the country into line with others such as Sweden and France.
- 2 November – First Minister Nicola Sturgeon and Cabinet Secretary for Finance and Constitution Derek Mackay set out the Scottish Government's income tax options regarding a rise in the rate of Scottish income tax
- December (scheduled) – Abellio ScotRail introduces new (Class 385) electric trains as part of Edinburgh to Glasgow Improvement Programme
- Undated – Shieldhall Strategic Tunnel constructed to carry wastewater under Glasgow

== The Arts ==
- Jackie Kay publishes Bantam, her first poetry book as Makar (National Poet for Scotland)

== Deaths ==
- 1 January – George Miller (born 1929), cricketer
- 11 January – Canon Kenyon Wright (born 1932), Episcopal priest and political campaigner, chair of the Scottish Constitutional Convention
- 18 January – Johnny Little (born 1930 in Canada), footballer (Rangers, Morton, Scotland)
- 26 January – Tam Dalyell (born 1932), politician
- 3 February – Gordon Aikman, Scottish ALS campaigner (born 1985)
- 27 February – Alex Young (born 1937), footballer (Hearts, Everton, Scotland)
- 2 March – Tommy Gemmell (born 1943), footballer (Celtic, Dundee, Scotland) and manager
- 1 April – Stuart Markland (born 1948), footballer (Berwick Rangers, Dundee United, Montrose)
- 7 April – Mary Mumford, 15th Lady Herries of Terregles (born 1940), peeress
- 10 April – Sir Arnold Clark (born 1927), businessman
- 20 May – James Weatherhead (born 1931), Church of Scotland minister, Moderator of the General Assembly of the Church of Scotland (1993–1994)
- 25 June – Gordon Wilson (born 1938), leader of the Scottish National Party (1979–1990)
- 29 June – James Davidson (born 1927), politician, Liberal MP for West Aberdeenshire (1966–1970)
- 5 July – John McKenzie (born 1925), footballer (Partick Thistle, Dumbarton, Scotland)
- 19 July – Joe Walters (born 1935), footballer (Clyde)
- 20 July – John McCluskey, Baron McCluskey (born 1929), lawyer, judge and life peer, Solicitor General for Scotland (1974–1979)
- 2 August – Dave Caldwell (born 1932), footballer (Aberdeen)
- 4 August – Chuck Hay (born 1930), curler
- 15 August – Joe McGurn (born 1965), footballer (St Johnstone, Alloa Athletic, Stenhousemuir)
- 20 August – Gordon Williams (born 1934), screenwriter and novelist
- 31 August – Tormod MacGill-Eain (born 1936), Scottish Gaelic comedian, novelist, poet, musician and broadcaster
- 10 September – Stephen Begley (born 1975) rugby union player (Glasgow Warriors)
- 1 October - John Swinburne (born 1930), former MSP 2003–2007.
- 26 October – Sir Gavin Laird (born 1933), trade unionist.
- 29 December – Jim Baikie (born 1940), comics artist

== See also ==
- 2017 in England
- 2017 in Northern Ireland
- 2017 in Wales
