= Frank Mulholland, Lord Mulholland =

Scottish judge (born 1959)

The Right Honourable Lord Mulholland CBE
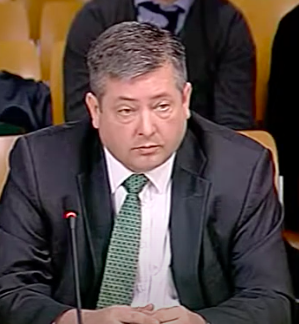

Senator of the College of Justice
- Incumbent
- Assumed office 15 December 2016
- Nominated by: Nicola Sturgeon; As First Minister
- Monarchs: Elizabeth II; Charles III
- Preceded by: Lord Stewart

Lord Advocate
- In office 19 May 2011 – 1 June 2016
- Monarch: Elizabeth II
- First Minister: Alex Salmond; Nicola Sturgeon
- Deputy: Lesley Thomson (Solicitor General)
- Preceded by: Lady Elish Angiolini
- Succeeded by: James Wolffe

Solicitor General for Scotland
- In office 19 May 2007 – 19 May 2011
- Monarch: Elizabeth II
- First Minister: Jack McConnell; Alex Salmond
- Preceded by: John Beckett
- Succeeded by: Lesley Thomson

Personal details
- Born: Francis Mulholland; 18 April 1959 (age 67) Coatbridge, Lanarkshire, Scotland
- Party: None
- Education: University of Aberdeen (LL.B., Dip.L.P.) University of Edinburgh (MBA)
- Occupation: Advocate
- Profession: Lawyer Judge

Francis Mulholland, Lord Mulholland, CBE, PC (born 18 April 1959) is a Scottish judge who has been a Senator of the College of Justice since 2016. He previously served from 2011 to 2016 as Lord Advocate, one of the Great Officers of State of Scotland and the country's chief Law Officer, and as Solicitor General, the junior Law Officer.

He was the first Advocate Depute and Senior Advocate Depute appointed from within the Procurator Fiscal Service, and only the second non-advocate appointed to the office of Lord Advocate, the first being his predecessor, Elish Angiolini. He was installed as a Senator of the College of Justice in December 2016, having served as a temporary judge for the previous 3 months.

During his career he appeared for the Crown in the 2004 Glasgow Ice Cream Wars appeals, prosecuted the significant HM Advocate v Transco case in 2005, the first ever prosecution of a public limited company for culpable homicide in the country, and oversaw prosecution of the infamous 2007 World's End murder trial, which collapsed due to insufficient evidence and resulted in a public dispute between the Lord Advocate of the time, Elish Angiolini, and the Lord Justice General, Lord Hamilton.

== Early life ==
Mulholland was born on 18 April 1959 in Coatbridge, to Charles and Jean Mulholland. He attended St Bernard's Primary School and Columba High School (now defunct) in Coatbridge. He studied at the School of Law of the University of Aberdeen, graduating with an LL.B. in 1981 and Diploma in Legal Practice in 1982, and completed his traineeship with Bird, Semple and Crawford Herron, Solicitors, Glasgow, being admitted as a solicitor in 1984, at which time he joined the Procurator Fiscal Service.

== Legal career ==
=== Early legal career ===
Mulholland's first posting was as a Procurator Fiscal Depute at Greenock, before being transferred to the same post at Glasgow in 1987. He remained there until 1991, when he was transferred to the Crown Office, working as a solicitor in the High Court Unit. He became a Notary Public (NP) in 1992 and joined the Society of Solicitors in the Supreme Courts of Scotland in 1993. In 1994, he moved from the Crown Office's High Court Unit to its Appeals Unit, and in 1995 qualified as a solicitor-advocate.

In 1997, he became the first member of the Procurator Fiscal service to be appointed an Advocate Depute, a lawyer charged with prosecuting in the High Court in the name of the Lord Advocate. He also graduated that year from the University of Edinburgh with a degree of Master of Business Administration (MBA). He became Assistant Procurator Fiscal at Edinburgh in 1999 and District Procurator Fiscal in 2000.

He remained in office at Edinburgh until 2003, when he returned to the ranks of Crown Counsel as the Senior Advocate Depute. He prosecuted the HM Advocate v Transco plc, the first prosecution of a public limited company for culpable homicide in Scotland, and represented the Crown in the successful 2004 appeals by Thomas Campbell and Joe Steele, convicted over the so-called Glasgow Ice Cream Wars. He was appointed Queen's Counsel (QC) in 2005, in the same round of appointments as John Beckett, whom he would later succeed as Solicitor General.

In January 2006, Mulholland was appointed by Lord Advocate Colin Boyd as Area Procurator Fiscal for Lothian and Borders, the head of the Procurator Fiscal Service in that sheriffdom. In this role, he oversaw the high-profile trial for the 1977 World's End murders, which was thrown out of court by the trial judge, Lord Clarke, due to a lack of evidence. The Lord Advocate at the time, Elish Angiolini, made a statement to the Scottish Parliament, saying she was "disappointed" at the decision. This was criticised by Lord Justice General Lord Hamilton, head of the Scottish judiciary, who said it undermined the independence of the judiciary.

=== Solicitor General for Scotland ===
Following the 2007 Scottish election, newly elected SNP First Minister Alex Salmond appointed Mulholland to succeed Labour Party member John Beckett as Solicitor General, the junior of the two Law Officers of the Crown in Scotland. Beckett, who had been junior defence counsel for Abdelbaset al-Megrahi in the Lockerbie trial, was subsequently appointed a floating sheriff.

The SNP government said at the time that they believed Mulholland to have no political affiliation. His appointment was approved by the Scottish Parliament without the need for a vote and he was sworn in as Solicitor General at a ceremony at the Court of Session on 30 May 2007. His appointment was significant in that it was the first time neither the Lord Advocate nor the Solicitor General had been a member of the Faculty of Advocates. Both were invited to join the faculty by its dean, Richard Keen, in October 2008.

Whilst Solicitor General, he formed the new Serious and Organised Crime Division within the Crown Office, as well as leading the successful prosecution of Peter Tobin in 2007 for the 1991 murder of fifteen-year-old Vicky Hamilton.

=== Lord Advocate ===
Official Lord Advocate portrait, 2011

Mulholland was appointed Lord Advocate, the senior Law Officer in Scotland, following the 2011 Scottish Parliament election. He succeeded Elish Angiolini and his appointment was agreed by the Scottish Parliament on 25 May. He was succeeded as Solicitor General by Lesley Thomson, Area Procurator Fiscal for Glasgow. On 13 July 2011, Mulholland was appointed to the Privy Council.

Mulholland was appointed Commander of the Order of the British Empire (CBE) in the 2017 New Year Honours for services to law in Scotland for his service as Lord Advocate.

=== Senator of the College of Justice ===
On 11 May 2016 it was announced that he was to be appointed a Senator of the College of Justice, his appointment to take effect later in the year.

On 1 September 2016, Mullholland was appointed as a temporary judge of the Court of Session, to fill the gap caused by Lady Smith's appointment as chair to the Scottish Child Abuse Inquiry. The Judicial Office for Scotland announced that "Judge Mulholland will not hear any criminal case in which, by reason of his previous role as Lord Advocate and head of the prosecution service, he would require to recuse himself; nor any civil case involving the Scottish government which, given his former role as the Scottish government's principal legal adviser, he would again need to recuse himself. The requirement for Judge Mulholland to recuse himself will, of course, diminish over time."

On 15 December 2016, Mulholland was formally installed as a permanent Senator of the College of Justice, taking the judicial title of Lord Mulholland. He replaced Lord Stewart, who had retired.

On 28 January 2026 it was announced that the Lord President, Lord Pentland, and Lord Justice Clerk, Lord Beckett, had recommended Lord Mulholland for appointment to the Second Division of the Inner House of the Court of Session with effect from 1 February 2026, replacing Lady Paton who had retired.

=== Malicious prosecution of David Whitehouse and Paul Clark ===
In 2021 Mulholland's successor as Lord Advocate apologised to Paul Clark and David Whitehouse for the decision to prosecute them in 2015 over the takeover of Rangers football club. In a statement to the Scottish Parliament, James Wolffe QC said the prosecution had taken place without probable cause and was malicious. Damages of over £20 million were awarded to Green and Whitehouse. The former Labour MP Sir Brian Donohoe subsequently called on Mulholland to step down as a Senator of the College of Justice, saying his reputation had been badly damaged by the scandal.

== Awards and honours ==
In June 2013, he was awarded an honorary degree from the University of Aberdeen by the Duchess of Rothesay.

== See also ==
- First Salmond government
- Government of the 4th Scottish Parliament

Legal offices
Preceded by John Beckett	Solicitor General for Scotland; 2007–11	Succeeded by Lesley Thomson
Preceded by Elish Angiolini	Lord Advocate; 2011–2016	Succeeded by James Wolffe
Preceded by Angus Stewart, Lord Stewart	Senator of the College of Justice; 2016–present	Incumbent
