= Lord Stewart =

Lord Stewart may refer to:

- Lord Steward, a royal official in the United Kingdom
- Angus Stewart, Lord Stewart (b. 1946), a Scottish judge
- Lord Bernard Stewart (1623–1645), a Royalist commander in the English Civil War
- Charles Vane, 3rd Marquess of Londonderry (1778–1854), a British peer who was created Baron Stewart before inheriting the marquessate
- Keith Stewart, Baron Stewart of Dirleton, a British lawyer
