= 2017 in Scottish television =

This is a list of events in Scottish television from 2017.

== Events ==
=== February ===
- 22 February – Tony Hall, Baron Hall of Birkenhead, the BBC's director general, announced a new dedicated TV channel for Scotland with a £30 million budget.

=== April ===
- 23 April – Local channels STV Glasgow and STV Edinburgh close and are replaced by a single channel STV2 which acts as a sister channel to STV. STV2 also launches in Aberdeen, Dundee and Ayr, the three areas which STV had also been awarded a local TV licence. A single networked schedule is broadcast in all five areas.
- 24 April – The first edition of a new primetime weeknight news programme called STV News Tonight, which combines news from across all of Scotland with UK and international news, is broadcast on STV2.
- 27 April – STV announce the first Scottish live televised leaders debate of the 2017 United Kingdom general election on 24 May, chaired by the broadcaster's political editor Bernard Ponsonby, with the leaders of four parties invited: the Scottish National Party (SNP), the Conservatives, Labour and the Liberal Democrats.

=== May ===
- 5 May – BBC announces a 90-minute televised debate for the General election 2017 on 21 May chaired by Sarah Smith, with the leaders of the five main Scottish parties: SNP, Conservatives, Labour, Scottish Greens and Liberal Democrats.

=== November ===
- 5 November – 2017 Scotland BAFTA Awards were held at the Radisson Blu Hotel in Glasgow.

== Debuts ==
- 22 January – Timeline

== Television series ==
- Reporting Scotland (1968–1983; 1984–present)
- Sportscene (1975–present)
- Landward (1976–present)
- The Beechgrove Garden (1978–present)
- Eòrpa (1993–present)
- Only an Excuse? (1993–2020)
- River City (2002–2026)
- The Adventure Show (2005–present)
- An Là (2008–present)
- Trusadh (2008–present)
- STV Rugby (2009–2010; 2011–present)
- STV News at Six (2009–present)
- The Nightshift (2010–present)
- Scotland Tonight (2011–present)
- Shetland (2013–present)
- Scot Squad (2014–present)
- Still Game (2002–2007; 2016–2019)
- Two Doors Down (2016–present)

== See also ==
- 2017 in Scotland
