= 2016 in Scottish television =

This is a list of events in Scottish television from 2016.

== Events ==
=== March ===
- 24 March – the first Scottish Parliament election leaders' debate featured Nicola Sturgeon, Patrick Harvie, Ruth Davidson, Kezia Dugdale, Willie Rennie, and David Coburn. The live debate was hosted by BBC Scotland in Glasgow.
- 29 March – the second leaders' debate featured the five leaders of the parties which held seats in the last Parliament. The live debate was hosted by STV.

=== May ===
- 25 May – Jim McColl and the production team of Tern television for the 1000th episode of The Beechgrove Garden receive the 2016 Royal Television Society Scotland Awards.

=== September ===
- 21 September – STV announce that they will launch a new half-hourly programme covering domestic, UK and international news- to be rolled out early the following year, ahead of the BBC arriving at a decision about a Scottish Six programme.

=== November ===
- 6 November – Shetland won best TV drama and Douglas Henshall was named best TV actor at the BAFTA Scotland awards.

=== December ===
- 7 December – Donalda MacKinnon appointed BBC Scotland's first female director.
  - 14 December – Scotland 2016 is broadcast on BBC Two Scotland for the final time.

== Debuts ==
- 5 August – Highlands: Scotland's Wild Heart made for BBC Scotland by Maramedia, a Glasgow-based production company.
- The River (2016) on BBC

== Ending this year ==
- 14 December – Scotland 2016 (2014)

== Television series ==
- Reporting Scotland (1968–1983; 1984–present)
- Sportscene (1975–present)
- Landward (1976–present)
- The Beechgrove Garden (1978–present)
- Eòrpa (1993–present)
- Only an Excuse? (1993–2020)
- River City (2002–2026)
- The Adventure Show (2005–present)
- An Là (2008–present)
- Trusadh (2008–present)
- STV Rugby (2009–2010; 2011–present)
- Gary: Tank Commander (2009–present)
- STV News at Six (2009–present)
- The Nightshift (2010–present)
- Scotland Tonight (2011–present)
- Shetland (2013–present)
- Scot Squad (2014–present)
- Still Game (2002–2007; 2016–2019)
- Two Doors Down (2016–present)

== Deaths ==
- 31 March – Ronnie Corbett, 85, comedian and writer

== See also ==
- 2016 in Scotland
