= Murder of Karen Buckley =

2015 murder in Scotland

- Karen Buckley
- Location: 55.958492°N 4.359152°W; Glasgow
- Date: 12 April 2015; 11 years ago 1am-4am (GMT)
- Attack type: Murder by bludgeoning with a spanner
- Weapon: Spanner
- Victims: Karen Buckley, aged 24
- Perpetrators: Alexander Pacteau
- Criminal information
- Mug Shot of Alexander Pacteau, convicted murderer of Karen Buckley
- Motive: None
- Verdict: Guilty
- Convictions: Murder
- Sentence: Life imprisonment with the possibility of parole after 23 years
- Judge: Lady Rita Rae

On 12 April 2015, 24-year-old nursing student Karen Buckley was murdered in Glasgow, Scotland, after leaving a nightclub that she had attended with her friends at 1 a.m. She was approached by Alexander Pacteau, a 21-year-old courier company owner, and entered his car after presumably being offered a lift home. Pacteau went on to beat her to death with a spanner, put her body inside a barrel full of caustic soda, and hide it at a farm shortly after.

Only three days later, on 15 April 2015, Pacteau was arrested as a suspect in Buckley's disappearance after an abundance of evidence pointed to him being potentially guilty. He would later confess to her murder and be sent to life imprisonment with the possibility of parole in 23 years.

== Background ==
=== Karen Buckley ===
Karen Buckley was born in 1991 and grew up on a farm in Mourneabbey, County Cork, Ireland with parents John and Marian Buckley and her three older brothers. Karen had a normal upbringing as a teenager, she attended St. Mary's Secondary School in Mallow, County Cork and played Gaelic football for Mourneabbey. After finishing secondary school Buckley attended the University of Limerick and graduated with a degree in nursing. Buckley was fond of travel and going out and was often described as kind, compassionate, family-driven and determined.

After graduating, Buckley secured a job at the Princess Alexandra Hospital in Essex, England, where she worked for a few months before moving to Scotland to study occupational therapy at Glasgow University. She lived in an apartment in Garnethill, Glasgow near some of her friends.

=== Alexander Pacteau ===
Alexander Benjamin Pacteau was born in January 1994 to parents Noreen and Guillaume Pacteau. His father was French and owned a successful courier business, and his mother was a stay-at-home parent. Pacteau was the oldest of four children. Pacteau was described as a badly behaved child; he was very obnoxious, often threw tantrums and caused mischief, to the point that he was given the nickname "trouble". Pacteau grew up wealthy in Bearsden and attended Kelvinside Academy as a teenager, but after his father's business collapsed, Pacteau switched to attend Bearsden Academy. During childhood, Pacteau was an average student, with a small circle of friends and was socially awkward. Pacteau dropped out of school in 2011 at age 17 to begin his own courier business. He briefly attended a business course before dropping out.

In November 2011, Pacteau was accused of attacking a separate 24-year-old woman after approaching her outside a nightclub, she agreed to enter a taxi with him, as they were looking for it, he pushed her into an alley, and allegedly sexually assaulted her. The woman's screams were heard by two men on a balcony who rushed to her aid. In 2013 he was found not guilty by a court. In 2013 Pacteau's parents split up, with Pacteau choosing to live with his mother in Drymen, eventually moving in with his father in his apartment. Pacteau's father would eventually kick him out after a spat with his father's new girlfriend, with Pacteau moving into an apartment in Drumchapel shortly afterwards. Pacteau struggled to find employment, leading to an incident in 2014 where he faced a conviction for forging bank notes and being sentenced to carry out 25 hours of community service.

In February 2015, Pacteau moved into a three-bedroom apartment in Kelvinside, Glasgow.

== Initial disappearance ==
On 11 April 2015, Pacteau and a group of his friends planned to attend "The Sanctuary", a nightclub in Glasgow. After the group had spent the night drinking at Pacteau's flat, Pacteau arranged for two taxis to collect himself and his friend group but only one arrived, so Pacteau drove half of the group to the club in his Ford Focus, while the taxi took the other half. Pacteau's group arrived at 11:38pm and went to a booth in the club that they had booked beforehand. A few minutes after Pacteau, at 11:45pm Karen Buckley and some of her friends arrived at the club.

At around 1am, Buckley told her friends that she was leaving the club and that they would catch up later that day. While her friends expressed concern over Buckley leaving alone, she assured them that she would get a taxi and she would be okay, further assured by the fact that Buckley was not drunk. CCTV footage later captured Buckley outside the club running into Pacteau, who had told a steward he was retrieving something from his car, where the two are shown having a brief conversation (presumably Pacteau offering Buckley a lift) before walking in the direction of Pacteau's car together. The two did not know each other.

Later that day, Buckley's friends contacted Police Scotland and reported her missing after she had not returned home like she had intended to and a widescale police operation was implemented. It was found that Buckley had left her jacket in the club, and on CCTV she was caught talking to a man who was later identified as Pacteau in Dumbarton Road. Police Scotland released several screenshots of the CCTV footage, urging anyone with any knowledge of Buckley's whereabouts, the man she was talking to, or the Ford Focus shown in the footage to come forward. Her parents flew to Scotland from Ireland soon after the report to plead for Buckley's return.

== Murder ==
In the early morning of 12 April, after Buckley entered Pacteau's car and the pair drove to Kelvin Way, Pacteau went on to repeatedly strike Karen with a spanner around 13 times and strangled her.

=== Attempts to cover murder ===
Pacteau then drove the body to his apartment while his flatmate were gone. He carried Buckley's body to the bathroom and placed it in a bath full of caustic soda, which he had been seen buying on CCTV beforehand, in an attempt to dissolve the body and clear the flat of any traces of blood.

However, his flatmate was expected to return soon so Pacteau, fearful of the amount of time he had left, threw the spanner used as the murder weapon into the Forth and Clyde Canal, drained the bathtub, and placed Buckley's body inside a duvet overnight. The following day he would attempt to clean the mattress and duvet of blood, and when that failed he went on to simply burn everything which Buckley's body had touched, purchase a large blue barrel, which he filled with caustic soda and placed the body in. He went on to leave the barrel at High Craigton Farm, after making a deal to rent an outhouse with the farmer. On top of the barrel, he had placed a bicycle wheel, sheet, and paper shredder.

At some point, Pacteau had had his car thoroughly cleaned, and he had hidden Buckley's handbag at Dawsholm Park.

== Investigation ==
=== Suspicion falls on Pacteau ===
Pacteau was seen multiple times on CCTV outside the Sanctuary nightclub on the night Buckley disappeared.

Due to CCTV footage of Pacteau talking to Buckley moments prior to her disappearance, Pacteau emerged as a prime suspect early on. After Buckley was last seen, CCTV footage showed Pacteau's car, a grey Ford Focus, driving down Dumbarton Road, turning to Kelvin Way, and re-emerging 12 minutes later.

The day after Buckley's disappearance, Pacteau was seen on multiple CCTV cameras in supermarkets and DIY stores buying various cleaning supplies, he had even asked a shop assistant at another supermarket for recommendations on products that could remove blood from a mattress. He had made other odd purchases following Buckley's disappearance including over six litres of caustic soda from separate shops, a mask, gloves, and a large blue barrel. After searching Pacteau's phone, police found that he had looked up chemical properties of sodium hydroxide.

=== Interrogation ===
After Pacteau was identified on CCTV and his car matched the one shown on CCTV, officers visited his apartment twice to speak to him. On the first visit, no one answered the door, but on the second one at around 6pm, Pacteau answered and invited them in. As soon as Pacteau opened the door, the officers immediately noticed a strong smell of bleach. The detectives looked around his apartment and in his bedroom they noticed a roll of duct tape, nail brushes, a toolbox, and that his mattress did not fit his bed frame.

During questioning, Pacteau told the officers that he met Karen outside "The Sanctuary" nightclub, then they went to his apartment and she eventually left at around 4 am. Later, Pacteau agreed to go to Helen Street police station in Govan to give a witness statement by 15 April. However, when he did this, it was noticed that his story had changed, as he now said that after Buckley went to his apartment, the pair had a few drinks, consensual sex, and then Buckley had hit her head on the bed frame before leaving the flat at 4am. He stated that he didn't notice the blood on the bedsheet until later in the morning after she had gone. Pacteau also said that when Buckley was announced as missing, he "panicked", knowing he was probably the last person to see her, so he had gotten rid of some of his clothes and the blood-stained mattress from his flat and burned it. Furthermore, after searching his clothes Police found a receipt in his trouser pocket which showed he had purchased padlocks and caustic soda at some point.

Following the overload of CCTV evidence and his suspicious behaviour, police decided there was sufficient evidence to treat him as a suspect in the murder.

=== Forensic search and Dawsholm Park search ===
Buckley's handbag, containing her phone and passport, had been found by a member of the public near a rubbish bin at Dawsholm Park, resulting in a wide search there which included helicopters and sniffer dogs. This caused more suspicion of Pacteau's story as Buckley would be walking in the opposite direction of the park if his story of her leaving his flat at 4am was true.

After Pacteau was an official suspect, Police cordened his apartment and car off to search it forensically. Pacteau was sent to stay at a nearby Holiday Inn. Swabs taken from Pacteau's flat later proved traces of Buckley's blood and dirt was found on his car tyres which proved he had been at Dawsholm Park, the area Buckley's handbag had been found, at some point. Forensic evidence was damning against Pacteau as small blood spots were found in his car, bathroom, and bedroom.

== Arrest ==
With the overwhelming amount of evidence connecting him to the disappearance, Pacteau was detained in a Starbucks on 15 April 2015 in Nelson Mandela Place in Glasgow city centre at around 2pm and again taken to Helen Street Police Office for further questioning.

At the police station, police found a note in Pacteau's pocket which outlined what he had said to them on his first visit, presumably in an attempt to remember what he had said the first time.

== Body discovery ==
Following Pacteau's detainment, Police released a statement that Pacteau had been detained due to clear connections with Buckley's disappearance, and about an hour later, they received a call from an acquaintance of Pacteau's with information leading to High Craigton Farm, saying that Pacteau has stored fireworks and other items there.

Officers arrived there at around 3:30pm and initially looked for storage units with new padlocks on them, as Pacteau had bought padlocks recently. After a few hours of searching, officers found a blue barrel hidden under a sheet, bicycle wheel and paper shredder. As they knew Pacteau had bought caustic soda, they waited for the barrel to be deemed safe for examining. Once it was, at 8pm on April 15, the police were met with the gruesome sight of Buckley's body, naked and submerged in caustic soda.

The barrel was then taken to Southern General Hospital in Glasgow, where a post-mortem examination was carried out, revealing that Buckley had suffered multiple soft neck injuries, and about 12 or 13 heavy blows to her head, which fractured her skull and led to subdural haemorrhage, causing her brain to bleed out. Pacteau's fingerprints were also found inside the barrel.

When questioned further, Pacteau changed his story for a third time, saying that during consensual sex, after Karen had hit her head, she got angry at him and slapped him in the face, and in retaliation Pacteau hit her repeatedly with a spanner. This was not believed.

== Trial ==
In August 2015, Pacteau appeared in The High Court in Glasgow where he would admit to murdering Buckley. The judge, Lady Rita Rae, told the High Court that Pacteau, from Bearsden, Glasgow, must serve a minimum of 23 years for the murder of Buckley before he could apply for parole.

Detective superintendent Jim Kerr, who led the investigation, admitted that the attack was unmotivated, and any woman could have been subjected to what Buckley was. He said: "I think there was a premeditated plan that night to find some victim. He has been calculated and callous. They're complete strangers and he's made a concerted effort to destroy any evidence as to Karen's whereabouts. He had the opportunity at various times during this investigation to tell us exactly where she was and he didn't do that either."

The trial resulted in Pacteau being sentenced to life in prison.

== Aftermath and memorials ==
Buckley's parents made a statement thanking the police and people of Scotland for their work on the case and for helping bring their daughter justice.

Shortly after the conviction, a vigil was held to celebrate Buckley's life and to honour her family before her family headed back to Ireland to arrange Buckley's funeral. In 2016, Buckley's father collected her master's degree on behalf of his daughter.

== See also ==
- List of solved missing person cases (2010s)
- Murder of Amanda Duffy
- Murder of Esther Brown
