= Rector of the University of Glasgow =

Senior post within the University of Glasgow

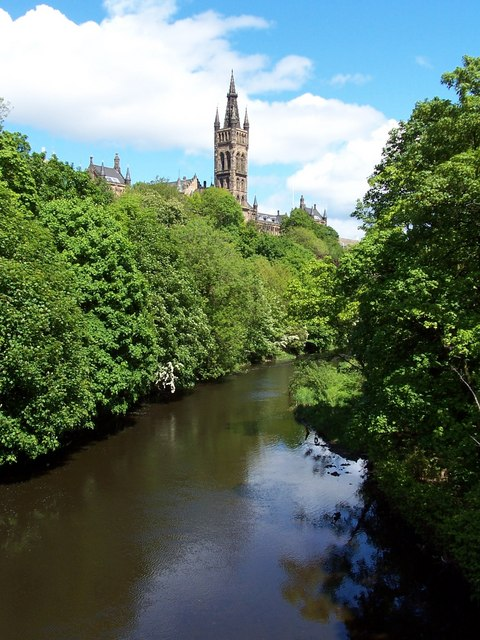
The tower of the University of Glasgow above Kelvingrove Park

The (Lord) Rector of the University of Glasgow is one of the most senior posts within the institution, elected every three years by students. The theoretical role of the rector is to represent students to the senior management of the university and raise issues which concern them. In order to achieve this, the rector is the statutory chair of the Court, the governing body of the university.

The position's place in the university was enshrined by statute in the Universities (Scotland) Act 1889, which provided for the election of a rector at all of the universities in existence at the time in Scotland (being St Andrews, Glasgow, Aberdeen and Edinburgh). Students of the University of Dundee also elect a rector.

The latest rectorial election was concluded on 26 March 2024, and featured four candidates: Dr Ghassan Abu-Sittah, Susan McCabe, Paul Sweeney MSP, and Lady Rita Rae, who was seeking re-election. Dr Ghassan Abu-Sittah, who received over 80% of the votes, was consequently installed as rector on the 11th of April 2024.

== Former rectors ==
Students have not always voted for working rectors; anti-apartheid activists Winnie Mandela (1987–1990) and Albert Lutuli (1962–1965) were elected on the understanding that they would be unable to undertake the position's responsibilities, while Mordechai Vanunu (2005–2008) was unable to fulfil his duties as he was not allowed to leave Israel and Edward Snowden (2014–2017) was not expected to fulfill his duties due to an ongoing self-imposed exile in Russia. However, other recent Rectors have been elected on the presumption they will be working rectors, e.g. Ross Kemp (1999–2000), who resigned from the post after the Students' Representative Council voted to request his resignation, such was the extent of student dissatisfaction with his performance. At the Rectorial election in February 2004, no nominations for the post of rector had been received. Upon the end of Greg Hemphill's term, the university was left without a rector for the first time in the position's history. The University Senate set another election date for December, when Mordechai Vanunu was elected. The post was left vacant for a second time at the end of Aamer Anwar's term in March 2020, with the scheduled Rectorial election postponed until March 2021 due to the COVID-19 pandemic. The previous rector was Lady Rita Rae, who was the first woman to hold the position in a standing capacity in the University's history. However, during her term she faced heavy criticism from the student body due to her alleged absenteeism, which she denied.

== Nations ==
Until 1977, for Rectorial election purposes, the university was divided into four 'nations' based on the students' birthplace, originally called Clidisdaliae, Thevidaliae, Albaniae and Rosay, and later as Glottiana, Loudoniana, Transforthana and Rothseiana. Three of the 'nations' consisted of defined areas in Scotland, with Loudoniana consisting of students from all other places.

== List of rectors ==
17th-century University of Glasgow rectors
Years	Name	Nationality	Biography
1643–1644	Archibald Fleming 1st Baronet of Ferme	Scotland	Commissary and Burgess
1648–1650	Robert Ramsay	Scotland	Clergyman
1669–1678	William Fleming 2nd Baronet of Ferme	Scotland	Commissary and Burgess
1690–1691	David Boyle	Scotland	Lord Clerk Register
1691–1718	Sir John Maxwell of Nether Park	Scotland	Commissioner for Renfrewshire in the Scottish Parliament

18th-century University of Glasgow rectors
Years	Name	Nationality	Biography
1691–1718	Sir John Maxwell of Nether Park	Scotland	Commissioner for Renfrewshire in the Scottish Parliament
1718–1720	Mungo Graham of Gorthie	Scotland	Commr. justiciary for Highlands
1720–1723	Robert Dundas, of Arniston, the elder	Scotland	Lord President of the Court of Session
1723–1725	James Hamilton of Aikenhead	Scotland	
1725–1726	Sir Hugh Montgomerie of Hartfield	Scotland	
1726–1729	George Ross	Scotland	Master of Ross, 13th Lord Ross
1729–1731	Francis Dunlop of Dunlop	Scotland	
1731–1733	John Orr of Barrowfield	Scotland	
1733–1738	Colin Campbell of Blythswood	Scotland	
1738–1740	George Bogle of Daldowie,	Scotland	Glasgow Tobacco Lord
1740–1742	John Graham of Dugalston	Scotland	
1742–1743	John Orr of Barrowfield	Scotland	
1743–1746	George Bogle of Daldowie	Scotland	
1746–1748	Sir John Maxwell of Pollock	Scotland	
1748–1750	George Bogle of Daldowie	Scotland	
1750–1753	Sir John Maxwell of Pollock	Scotland	
1753–1755	William Mure of Caldwell	Scotland	
1755–1757	John Boyle	Scotland	The 3rd Earl of Glasgow
1757–1759	Patrick Boyle, Lord Shewalton	Scotland	
1759–1761	James Milliken of Milliken	Scotland	
1761–1763	The 15th Earl of Erroll	Scotland	Grand Master Mason of the Grand Lodge of Scotland
1763–1764	Thomas Miller	Scotland	Lord Glenlee, Lord Advocate
1764–1767	William Mure of Caldwell	Scotland	
1767–1768	Dunbar Douglas	Scotland	The 4th Earl of Selkirk
1768–1770	Sir Adam Ferguson of Kilkerran	Scotland	
1770–1772	Robert Ord	Scotland	
1772–1773	Lord Frederick Campbell	Scotland	Parliamentarian, Lord Clerk Register
1773–1775	Charles Schaw Cathcart,	Scotland	9th Lord Cathcart, General (British Army), Ambassador to Russia
1775–1777	Sir James William Montgomery	Scotland	Lord Advocate, Chief Baron of Exchequer
1777–1779	Andrew Stewart of Torrance	Scotland	
1779–1781	The 7th Earl of Lauderdale	Scotland	Scottish representative peer
1781–1783	Henry Dundas	Scotland	Lord Advocate
1783–1785	Edmund Burke	Ireland	Philosopher
1785–1787	Robert Graham of Gartmore	Scotland	Parliamentarian, former student
1787–1789	Prof. Adam Smith	Scotland	Professor of Moral Philosophy, author of The Wealth of Nations, former student
1789–1791	Walter Campbell of Shawfield	Scotland	
1791–1793	Thomas Kennedy of Dunure	Scotland	
1793–1795	William Mure of Caldwell	Scotland	
1795–1797	William McDowell of Garthland	Scotland	
1797–1799	George Oswald of Auchencruive	Scotland	
1799–1801	Lord Succoth	Scotland	Lord Justice General

19th-century University of Glasgow rectors
Years	Name	Nationality	Biography
1799–1801	Lord Succoth	Scotland	Lord Justice General
1801–1803	Lord Craig	Scotland	
1803–1805	Robert Dundas of Arniston	Scotland	Lord Advocate, Chief Baron of Exchequer
1805–1807	Henry Glassford of Dugalston	Scotland	
1807–1809	Archibald Colquhoun of Killermont	Scotland	Lord Advocate
1809–1811	Archibald Campbell of Blythswood	Scotland	
1811–1813	Lord Archibald Hamilton	Scotland	parliamentarian
1813–1815	General The 1st Baron Lynedoch	Scotland	Previously styled, up until May 1814, as General Sir Thomas Graham
1815–1817	Lord Boyle	Scotland	Lord Justice Clerk
1817–1819	The 4th Earl of Glasgow	Scotland	Prominent Scottish peer
1819–1820	Kirkman Finlay	Scotland	Lord Provost of Glasgow
1820–1822	Francis Jeffrey	Scotland	Senator of the College of Justice, former student
1822–1824	Sir James Mackintosh	Scotland	Jurist
1824–1826	Henry Brougham	Scotland	Lord Chancellor 1830–1834
1826–1829	Thomas Campbell	Scotland	Poet, former student
1829–1831	The 3rd Marquess of Lansdowne	England	Chancellor of the Exchequer
1831–1834	Henry Thomas Cockburn	Scotland	Senator of the College of Justice
1834–1836	Lord Stanley	England	a later Prime Minister of the United Kingdom
1836–1838	Sir Robert Peel	England	2nd Bt., the former Prime Minister of the United Kingdom
1838–1840	Sir James Graham	Scotland	2nd Bt., Home Secretary
1840–1842	The 2nd Marquess of Breadalbane	Scotland	parliamentarian, former Grand Master Mason of the Grand Lodge of Scotland
1842–1844	Fox Maule	Scotland	parliamentarian and a later Grand Master of the Grand Lodge of Scotland
1844–1846	Andrew Rutherfurd	Scotland	Lord Advocate
1846–1847	Lord John Russell	England	Prime Minister of the United Kingdom
1847–1848	William Mure of Caldwell	Scotland	classical scholar, parliamentarian
1848–1850	Thomas Babington Macaulay	England	Parliamentarian
1850–1852	Sir Archibald Alison, 1st Bt.	Scotland	Institutional legal writer
1852–1854	The 13th Earl of Eglinton	Scotland	a former (and a later) Lord Lieutenant of Ireland
1854–1856	The 8th Duke of Argyll	Scotland	parliamentarian
1856–1859	Sir Edward Bulwer-Lytton	England	writer and politician
1859–1862	The 8th Earl of Elgin	Scotland	Viceroy of India 1862–1863
1862–1865	The 3rd Viscount Palmerston	England	Prime Minister of the United Kingdom
1865–1868	Lord Glencorse	Scotland	Lord President of the Court of Session
1868–1871	The 15th Earl of Derby	England	a former (and a later) Secretary of State for Foreign Affairs
1871–1877	Benjamin Disraeli (1st Earl of Beaconsfield from 1876)	England	Prime Minister of the United Kingdom
1877–1880	William Ewart Gladstone	England	Prime Minister of the United Kingdom
1880–1883	John Bright	England	Quaker, activist
1883–1884	Henry Fawcett	England	economist and parliamentarian
1884–1887	Edmund Law Lushington	England	Professor of Greek
1887–1890	The 1st Earl of Lytton	England	former Viceroy of India
1890–1893	A.J. Balfour	Scotland	former Chief Secretary for Ireland and a later Prime Minister of the United Kingdom
1893–1896	Sir John Eldon Gorst	England	Solicitor General for England and Wales
1896–1899	Joseph Chamberlain	England	statesman, father of Sir Austen Chamberlain (Rector 1925–1928)
1899–1902	The 5th Earl of Rosebery	Scotland	former Prime Minister of the United Kingdom

20th-century University of Glasgow rectors
1899–1902	The 5th Earl of Rosebery	Scotland	former Prime Minister of the United Kingdom
1902–1905	George Wyndham	England	Chief Secretary for Ireland
1905–1908	H.H. Asquith	England	Prime Minister of the United Kingdom
1908–1911	The 1st Earl Curzon of Kedleston	England	former Viceroy of India, Foreign Secretary
1911–1914	Augustine Birrell	England	Chief Secretary for Ireland and poet
1914–1919	Raymond Poincaré	France	President of the French Republic and a former (and later) Prime Minister of France
1919–1922	Bonar Law	Scotland	Prime Minister of the United Kingdom, former student
1922–1925	The 1st Earl of Birkenhead	England	Lord Chancellor
1925–1928	Sir Austen Chamberlain	England	parliamentarian and statesman
1928–1931	Stanley Baldwin	England	Prime Minister of the United Kingdom
1931–1934	Compton Mackenzie	Scotland	novelist
1934–1937	Sir Iain Colquhoun	Scotland	7th Bt.
1937–1938	Dick Sheppard	England	pacifist
1938–1945	Sir Archibald Sinclair	Scotland	4th Bt., Leader of the British Liberal Party
1945–1947	Sir John Boyd-Orr	Scotland	physician, nutritionist and Nobel laureate (former student)
1947–1950	Walter Elliot	Scotland	politician (former student)
1950–1953	John MacCormick	Scotland	lawyer and famed nationalist (former student)
1953–1956	Tom Honeyman	Scotland	physician, director of Kelvingrove Art Gallery (former student)
1956–1959	Rab Butler	England	became Home Secretary while rector and a former Chancellor of the Exchequer (and a later Foreign Secretary)
1959–1962	Quintin Hogg	England	The 2nd Viscount Hailsham, Lord President of the Council (and a later Lord Chancellor)
1962–1965	Albert Lutuli	South Africa	President of the African National Congress and Nobel Peace Prize laureate (Absentee)
1965–1968	The 1st Baron Reith	Scotland	formerly the first Director-General of the BBC
1968–1971	George MacLeod	Scotland	The Baron MacLeod of Fuinary; Founder of the radical Christian organisation, the Iona Community; Past Moderator of the Church of Scotland
1971–1974	Jimmy Reid	Scotland	Trade union activist, his inaugural speech on social alienation was famous for its reference to the rat race
1974–1977	Arthur Montford	Scotland	sports journalist
1977–1980	John L. Bell	Scotland	Elected while a student at the university
1980–1984	Reginald Bosanquet	England	TV newsreader
1984–1987	Michael Kelly	Scotland	Lord Provost of Glasgow
1987–1990	Winnie Madikizela-Mandela	South Africa	South African activist and politician
1990–1993	Pat Kane	Scotland	musician, alumnus.
1993–1996	Johnny Ball	England	TV presenter
1996–1999	Richard Wilson	Scotland	actor
1999–2000	Ross Kemp	England	actor

21st-century University of Glasgow rectors
2001–2004	Greg Hemphill	Scotland	actor and alumnus
2004–2005	Position vacant		
2005–2008	Mordechai Vanunu	Israel	Israeli nuclear technician and whistle-blower (Absentee)
2008–2014	Charles Kennedy	Scotland	former Leader of the Liberal Democrats and alumnus.
2014–2017	Edward Snowden	United States	computer professional/intelligence whistleblower (Absentee)
2017–2020	Aamer Anwar	Scotland	Lawyer, human rights campaigner and alumnus
2019–2020	Position vacant		The 2020 election was postponed for a year due to the COVID-19 pandemic
2021–2024	Rita Rae, Lady Rae	Scotland	Former Senator of the College of Justice
2024-present	Dr Ghassan Abu-Sittah	Palestine	War surgeon who operated in Gaza during the Gaza war

== See also ==
- Ancient university governance in Scotland
- Chancellor of the University of Glasgow
- Principal of the University of Glasgow
