= Robin McEwan, Lord McEwan =

Scottish lawyer and former judge

The Honourable Lord McEwan

Senator of the College of Justice
- In office 2000–2008
- Nominated by: Donald Dewar; As First Minister
- Appointed by: Elizabeth

Personal details
- Born: Robin Gilmour McEwan; 12 December 1943 Paisley
- Died: 30 December 2023 (aged 80) Ayr, Scotland
- Spouse: Sheena
- Children: Two daughters
- Education: University of Glasgow
- Website: Scottish Courts Service

Robin Gilmour McEwan, commonly called Lord McEwan was a Scottish lawyer and former judge of the High Court of Justiciary and Court of Session, the country's Supreme Courts.

== Early life ==
McEwan was born on 12 December 1943 in Paisley, Renfrewshire, to Ian G. McEwan and Mary McEwan. He was educated at Paisley Grammar School, and the School of Law of the University of Glasgow, where he graduated with a First in Law. He held the Faulds Fellowship in Law at the university from 1965 to 1968, having been admitted to the Faculty of Advocates in 1967, and took a Ph.D. in 1969, entitled The rights and liabilities of the undisclosed principal in the law of agency.

From 1974 to 1976, McEwan was Standing Junior Counsel to the Department of Energy, and was appointed Advocate Depute in 1976, serving until 1979. He took silk in 1981, and became Chairman of the Industrial Tribunals the same year, serving until 1982, when he was appointed Sheriff of South Strathclyde, Dumfries and Galloway, first at Lanark but moving in 1988 to Ayr. He was a member of the Scottish Legal Aid Board from 1989 - 1996.

=== Publications ===
In 1980, he published a textbook on Pleading in Court and co-authored A Casebook of Damages in Scotland with Ann Paton; the two would later be appointed to the bench in the same year. He has also contributed to the Stair Memorial Encyclopaedia.

== The Bench ==
In 1991, McEwan became a temporary judge of the Court of Session and High Court of Justiciary, Scotland's supreme courts, and was appointed a permanent Senator of the College of Justice in 2000, taking the judicial title, Lord McEwan. He sat in the Outer House. He retired in 2008, his vacancy being filled by Valerie Stacey, Lady Stacey.

== Personal life ==
McEwan married Sheena McIntyre in 1973, with whom he has two daughters. He enjoyed golf, and was a member of the Honourable Company of Edinburgh Golfers and Prestwick Gold Club, and the New Club, Edinburgh. He was an Episcopalian and Chancellor of the Diocese of Glasgow and Galloway. He had been Deputy Chairman of the Boundary Commission for Scotland and a member of the Scottish Civil Courts Review since 2007. He died at the age of 80 on 30 December 2023.
