= Salman Abu Sitta =

Palestinian researcher and writer (born 1937)

- سلمان ابو ستة
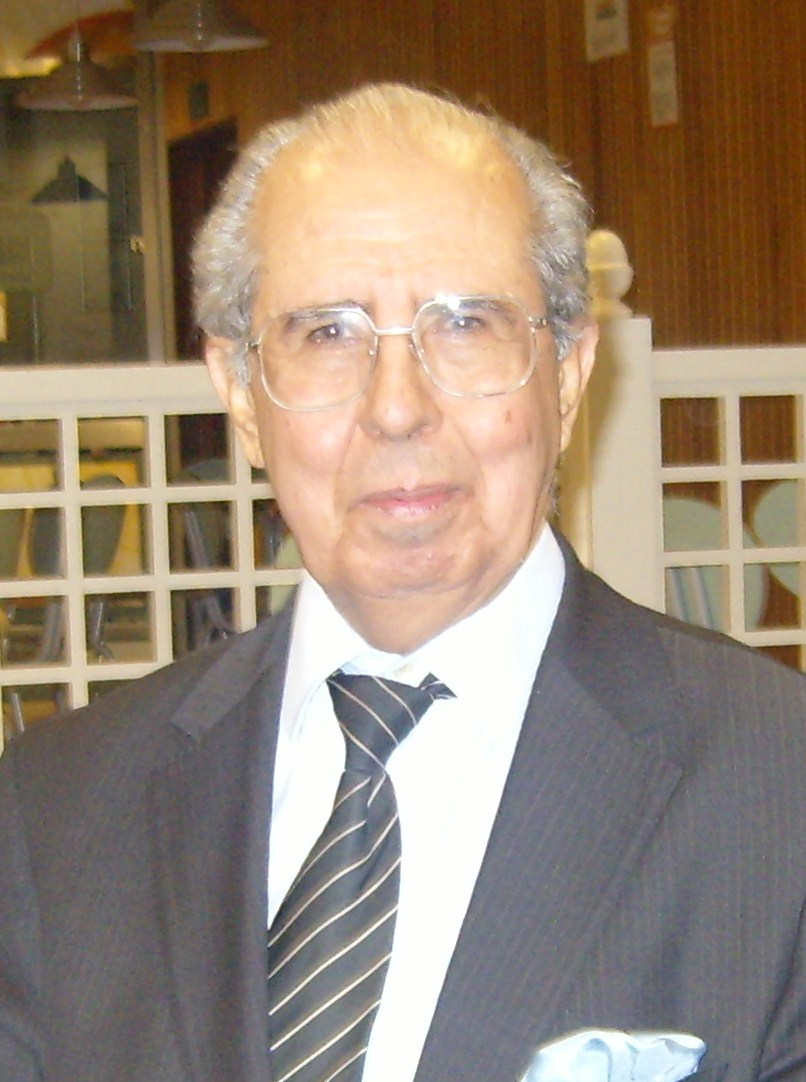
- Salman Abu Sitta after giving a lecture at the University of Nottingham
- Born: 1937 (age 88–89); Ma'in Abu Sitta, Beersheba district, Mandatory Palestine
- Family: Ghassan Abu-Sittah (nephew)

Academic background
- Education: Cairo University; University College London

Academic work
- Discipline: Palestinian Studies

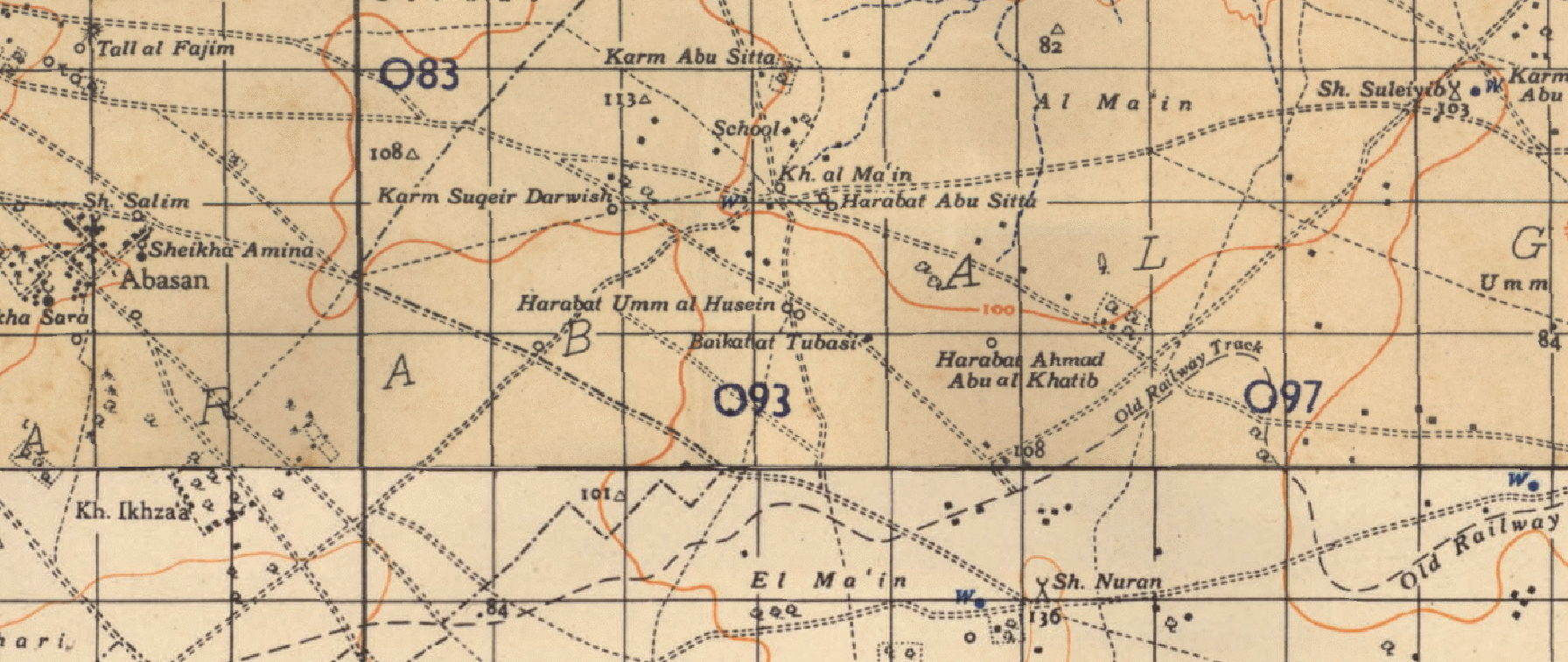
1940 Map with the village Al-Ma'in Abu Sitta, his birthplace, just eight kilometers from the Mediterranean Sea.

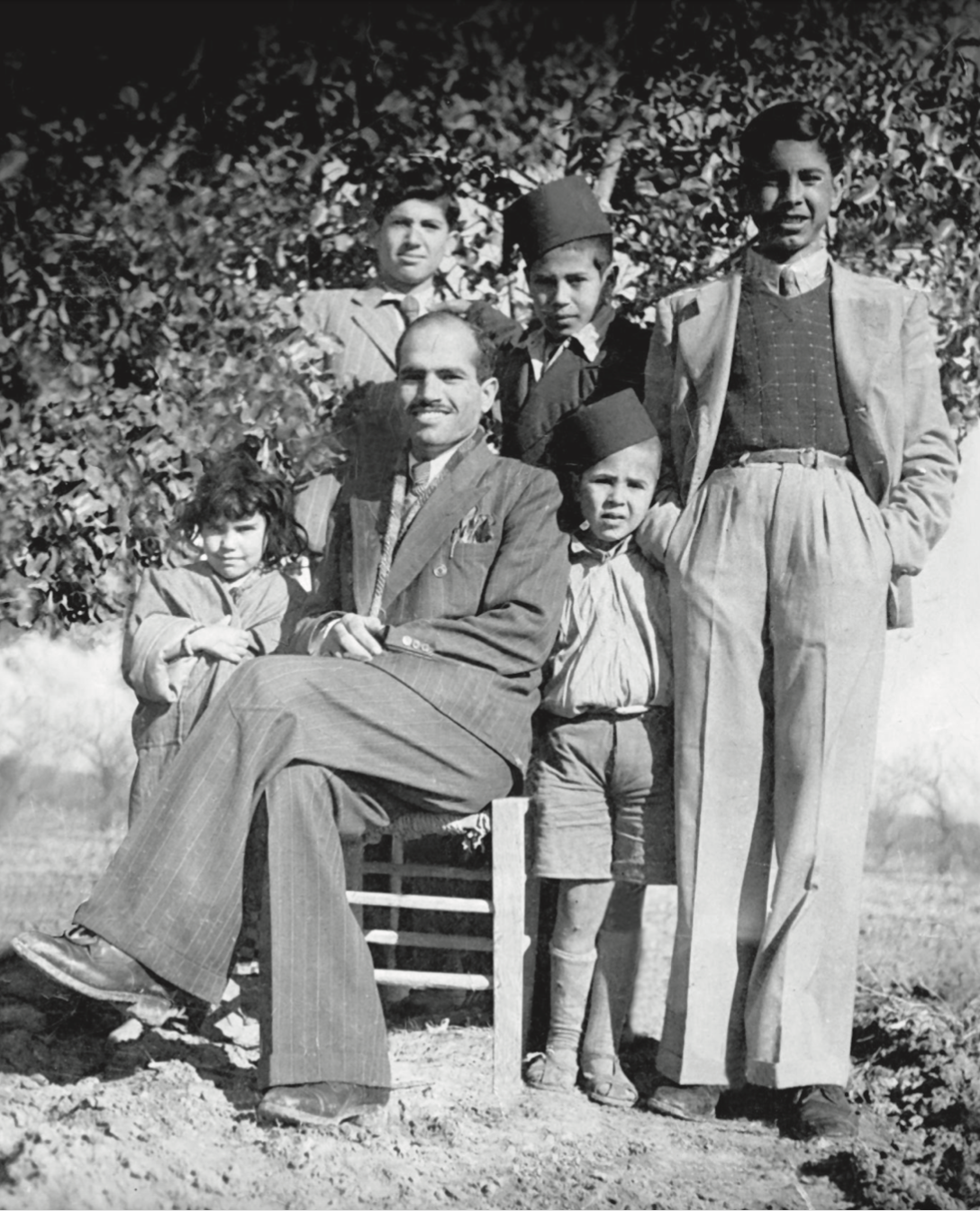
Salman Abu Sitta (center) aged six with his family.

Salman Abu Sitta (Arabic: سلمان ابو ستة; born 1937) is a Palestinian researcher. Abu Sitta, who was expelled from Palestine as a child in 1948, is most known for mapping Palestine and developing a practical plan for implementing the right of return of Palestinian refugees. He is the founder and President of Palestine Land Society in London, which aims to document Palestinian history and land.

== Early life ==
Salman Abu Sitta was born in 1937 into a Palestinian family. His family's land and the village bore their name, Ma'in Abu Sitta (the Abu Sitta springwell), in Beer Sheba District of Mandatory Palestine. Abu Sitta has recounted his childhood experiences of the Haganah destroying his village during the 1948 Palestine War and his family becoming refugees in Gaza. The kibbutzim of Nirim, Ein HaShlosha, Nir Oz, and Magen were later built on land belonging to his family.

Abu Sitta later attended and graduated from al-Saidiya secondary school in Cairo, Egypt, ranking first in Egypt. After graduating from Cairo University's Faculty of Engineering in 1958, Abu Sitta went to the United Kingdom to continue his post-graduate studies, receiving his PhD in Civil Engineering from the University of London, UCL.

== Career ==
He was a member of the Palestine National Council. He studied Palestinian refugee affairs and authored hundreds of papers on the subject. He directed international development and construction projects. He was the founder and President of the Palestine Land Society (PLS) He was the General Coordinator of the Right of Return Congress.

Abu Sitta engaged in debates with Israelis who professed interest in peace without the return of the refugees, including Uri Avnery and Rabbi Michael Lerner.

== Palestinian expulsion (al Nakba) ==
Abu Sitta researched Palestine before, during and after the Nakba, the expulsion and/or flight of Palestinians during the 1948 Palestine War. Abu Sitta's described his work as ensuring that "the memories and identity of the occupied homeland are never lost". He is regarded by Uri Avnery as perhaps 'the world's foremost expert on the Nakba'. The documentation process began when he was 30 years old, when he stumbled on the memoirs of the Turkish chief of Beersheba, when Palestine was under Ottoman rule. The document dated to the early twentieth century.

"It sort of started from there, and it has never stopped," Abu Sitta says. "I kept collecting all and any material on every inch of my homeland."

Abu Sitta claimed to show that the return of the refugees to their homes is sacred to Palestinians, legal under international law and possible without major disruption of Jewish settlement in Palestine. His work also includes the compendium Atlas of Palestine 1917-1966.

In 2016, Abu Sitta published his memoirs, Mapping My Return. In it, he describes his experiences as a child during the Nakba, his research, and his travels, including a 1995 trip he took to visit the ruins of Palestinian villages in Israel. He describes the fields that existed on his family's land in historical Palestine to challenge the Zionist assertion that the state of Israel "made the desert bloom".

== Views ==
Salman Abu Sitta strongly supports the Palestinian right of return. Abu Sitta formulated "a proposal to implement the Palestinian right of return without displacing Israel’s existing population". According to Abu Sitta, residential areas constitute just 2.5% of Israel's land area and it is possible for most refugees to have their lands back without displacing Israelis.

== Published works ==
- The Return Journey. (2007) Palestine Land Society ISBN 0-9549034-1-2
- Mapping My Return: A Palestinian Memoir American University in Cairo Press Series G - Reference, Information and Interdisciplinary Subjects Series. (2016) American University in Cairo Press, 2016 / Oxford University Press, 2016 ISBN 978-977-416-730-0
- Atlas of Palestine, 1917-1966 . Palestine Land Society (December 2010) ISBN 978-0-9549034-2-8
- The Palestinian Nakba 1948: The register of depopulated localities in Palestine (Occasional Return Centre studies) (1998 reprinted 2000) Palestinian Return Centre ISBN 1-901924-10-6

=== Articles ===
- Peace Palestine - Traces of Poison: Israel's Dark History Revealed, December 4, 2007 (about the biological war)
- Geography of Occupation
- Palestine Remembered Palestine Right Of Return, Sacred, Legal, and Possible
- Jerusalemite 7 June 2007 "Atlas of Palestine 1948: Reconstructing Palestine"

=== Videos ===
- 'Right of Return Conference, Day 1: Keynote Address, 13 May 2013.
- Dr Salman Abu Sitta’s Address to Balfour at the University of Edinburgh, Council for British Research in the Levant, 30 November 2022
