= Ghassan Abu-Sittah =

British-Palestinian plastic and reconstructive surgeon

Ghassan Abu-Sittah FRCS
- غسان أبو ستة
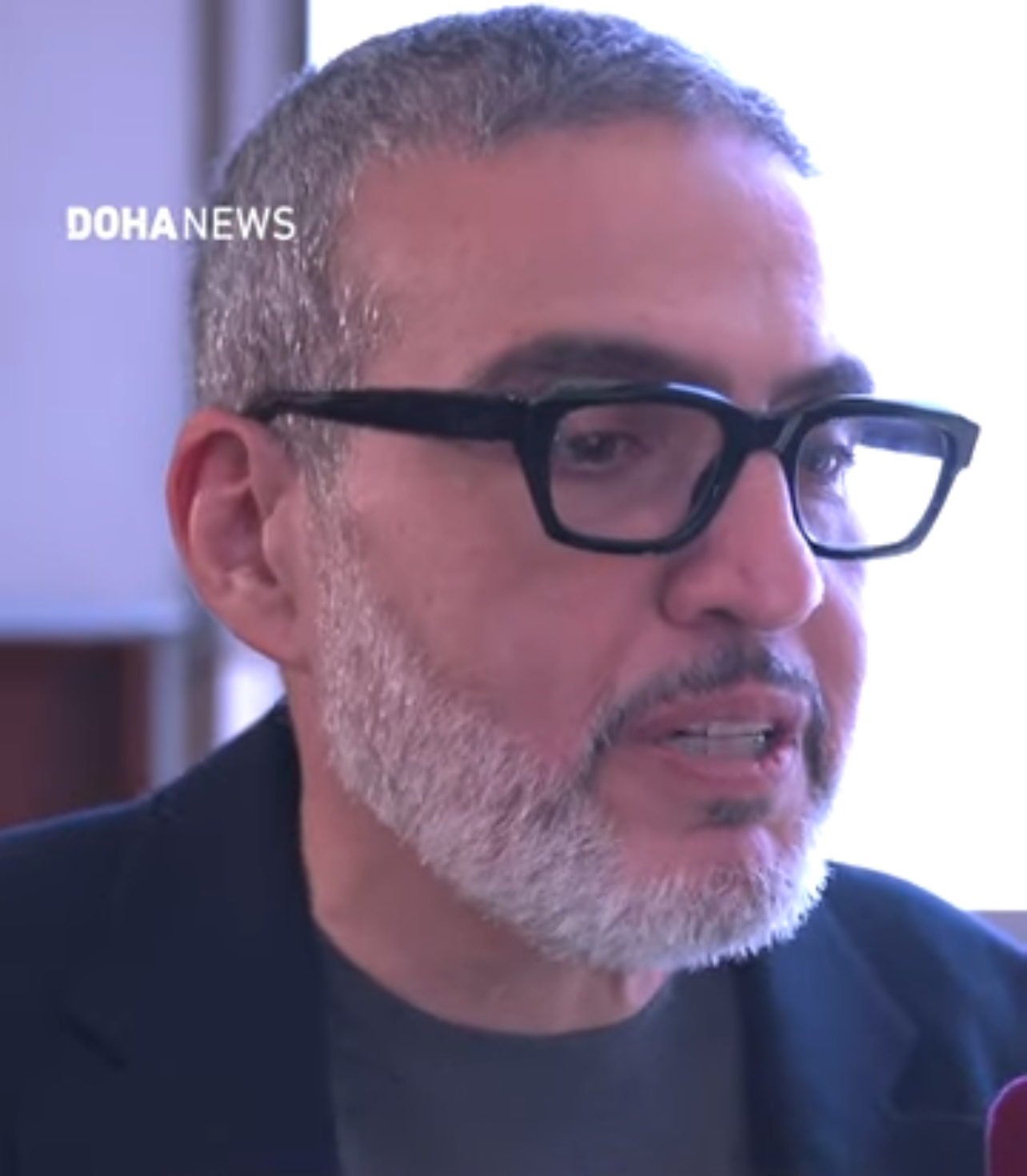
- Abu-Sittah in 2023
- Born: Ghassan Soleiman Abu-Sittah; 1969 (age 56–57); Kuwait
- Other name: Ghassan Abu Sitta
- Education: University of Glasgow
- Children: 3
- Family: Salman Abu Sitta (uncle)
- Medical career
- Profession: Doctor
- Field: Plastic and reconstructive surgery
- Institutions: Great Ormond Street Hospital; Royal London Hospital; American University of Beirut Hospital; Al-Shifa Hospital; Al-Ahli Arab Hospital
- Sub-specialties: Craniofacial surgery; Trauma surgery

Rector of the University of Glasgow
- Incumbent
- Assumed office 2024
- Preceded by: Rita Rae, Lady Rae
- Website: drghassanabusittah.com

Ghassan Soleiman Abu-Sittah (Arabic: غسان أبو ستة; born 1969 in Kuwait) is a British-Palestinian plastic and reconstructive surgeon who specialises in craniofacial surgery, aesthetic surgery, cleft lip and palate surgery, and trauma-related injuries. Since April 2024 he has served as Rector of the University of Glasgow.

He is known for providing medical assistance as a surgeon in twelve crisis and conflict areas, like in Iraq, Lebanon, Syria, and Yemen, where he supported local clinics and doctors, particularly in the Gaza Strip. He first visited the Gaza Strip as a medical student during the First Intifada in 1989, and was a member of Medical Aid for Palestinians during the Second Intifada starting 2000. He also travelled to the Gaza Strip during the 2008–2009 war, the 2012 operation, the 2014 war, and the 2018 Great March of Return.

Abu-Sittah returned to the Gaza Strip after the start of the Gaza war in 2023, where he provided medical assistance with Doctors Without Borders out of the Al-Shifa Hospital. He has spoken to news outlets and participated in press conferences discussing his experiences. In January 2024, he travelled to The Hague to meet with International Criminal Court (ICC) investigators. Germany subsequently attempted to ban him from entering the Schengen Area, but the ban was overturned in court.

== Early life and education ==
Abu-Sittah was born in 1969 in Kuwait to a Palestinian father and a Lebanese mother. He is the nephew of Salman Abu Sitta. Abu-Sittah's father's family originated in Ma'in Abu Sitta, south east of Gaza, where they had their house and Abu-Sittah's grandfather had built a school. During the Nakba, Zionist armed forces Haganah attacked the village, destroying indiscriminately and shooting anyone who got in their way. His father's family were expelled from their land and became refugees in the Gaza Strip. They later moved to Kuwait and, in the 1980s, to the United Kingdom.

In 1988, Abu-Sittah followed in his father's footsteps and studied medicine at Glasgow University.

== Career ==
After receiving his medical education at the University of Glasgow and completing his residency training in London, Abu-Sittah and began working for the National Health Service (NHS). He pursued three specialised fellowships: Pediatric Craniofacial Surgery and Cleft Surgery at Great Ormond Street Hospital, as well as Trauma Reconstruction at the Royal London Hospital.

In January 2011, Abu-Sittah joined the faculty of the American University of Beirut Hospital and moved to Beirut. He also provided remote assistance for surgeons working in the Gaza Strip. While in Lebanon, Abu Sitah's demonstrated his interest in Palestinian politics by writing Opinions for local papers.

He worked as the director of AUB’s Plastic and Reconstructive Surgery Department from 2012 until September 2020. In 2015, he also co-founded and co-directed the Conflict Medicine Program at the AUB's Global Health Institute.

Abu-Sittah returned to live in London with his wife and three sons, providing reconstructive and aesthetic consultations at his clinic in 2020. Since 2021, he was a lecturer at the Centre for Blast Injury Studies at Imperial College London and at the Conflict and Health Research Group of King's College London.

Abu-Sittah first visited the Gaza Strip as a medical student during the First Intifada in 1989. He was inspired to focus on conflict medicine by Ang Swee Chai. Abu-Sittah travelled to Gaza as a member of Medical Aid for Palestinians to provide medical assistance during the Second Intifada, the 2008-2009 Gaza War, the 2012 Israeli operation in the Gaza Strip, the 2014 Gaza War, and the 2018–2019 Gaza border protests. He worked on voluntary missions in twelve crisis and conflict areas in the West Asia, like in Iraq, Lebanon, Syria, and Yemen, where he supported local clinics and doctors.

Abu-Sittah was an editor and co-author of the book Reconstructing the War Injured Patient (2017) and The War Injured Child: From Point of Injury Treatment Through Management and Continuum of Care (2023). He is a trustee of the Institute for Palestine Studies. In April 2024, he was elected the Rector of the University of Glasgow.

=== Gaza war ===
Abu-Sittah returned to Gaza on 9 October 2023 at the onset of the Gaza war. He told Vogue Arabia that he provided medical assistance with Doctors Without Borders at Al-Shifa Hospital and Al-Ahli Arab Hospital, operating on victims of the conflict. Abu-Sitta was at Al-Ahli Arab Hospital during the night of the attack and wrote: "This incident served as a litmus test for what was to come: Israel’s full war on Gaza’s healthcare infrastructure. After Al-Ahli was hit, and no one was held to account, the domino pieces began to fall rapidly. Hospitals were targeted one after the other. It became obvious that the attacks were systemic."

He witnessed the war and spoke to news outlets and posted updates on Twitter about the hospital and some of the patients during the Al-Shifa Hospital siege.

On 16 October 2023, Abu-Sittah's family in London was questioned by the Metropolitan Police about his work in Gaza.

On 18 November, after 43 days voluntary work during the war, Abu-Sittah returned to England, as he became "redundant" because he could no longer perform surgeries due to a lack of medical supplies. In London he gave a press conference discussing his experiences, and gave testimony that he treated patients suffering from white phosphorus burns, which the Israeli army denied using. Scotland Yard’s War Crimes Unit contacted Abu-Sittah for witness testimony as it is obliged to gather evidence for the International Criminal Court (ICC) probe into alleged war crimes committed in Gaza.

In January 2024, he travelled to the Netherlands to meet with International Criminal Court (ICC) investigators in The Hague. And he gave evidence to the International Court of Justice (ICJ) for South Africa's genocide case against Israel. The ICJ also heard Nicaragua's lawsuit against Germany for facilitating genocide against Palestine by supplying weapons under the Genocide Convention.

Abu-Sittah was elected Rector of his alma mater, the University of Glasgow, on 26 March 2024, winning 80% of the vote.

The Times reported that Abu-Sittah had compared Israeli leadership to "the psychosis of the Germans in the 30s and the 40s.", further characterising the supporting western powers, including the US, UK, Germany, France, Australia and Canada, as being "the axis of genocide".

In April 2024, German authorities denied his entry to Germany while he was en route to speak at the Palestine Congress conference in Berlin where he would present evidence on the war in Gaza and his witness statement as a doctor working in two hospitals. Berlin also denied entry to Germany to other guests, including former Greek Finance Minister Yanis Varoufakis (DIEM25), who was also due to speak at the Palestine Congress conference. Shortly thereafter, the event was shut down by the police who said they cancelled it because Salman Abu Sitta, Ghassan Abu Sittah's uncle and one of the event speakers, was "forbidden from being politically active in Germany". Organisers of the event had, according to their statements after the cancellation, not been informed of this ban.

He was scheduled to speak to the Senate in France about the medical crisis in Gaza at the invitation of a Green Senator but was denied entry to France, on 4 May 2024, based on a Schengen-Area-wide entry ban for one year against him put in place by German authorities. Lawyers were able to provide the Greens with a link that allowed Abu-Sittah to join the symposium via video. Abu-Sittah was scheduled to speak to authorities in the ICC, which was exploring issuing arrest warrants for Israeli war criminals, including Prime Minister of Israel Benjamin Netanyahu.

Lawyers of the International Centre of Justice for Palestinians (ICJP) challenged the ban with the help of German lawyers. Subsequently the ICJP announced the travel restriction was overturned. And the Potsdam Administrative Court ruled on 14 May 2024 that the measures taken against Abu-Sittah were unlawful.

After thousands of people suffered "almost identical injuries" when PETN booby-trapped pagers were detonated in the coordinated Israeli attack in Lebanon and Syria on 17 September 2024, Abu-Sittah volunteered at the American University of Beirut Medical Center, providing medical assistance.

== Personal life ==
As of 2023, he lives in London with his wife and three sons.

== Awards ==
Ghassan Abu Sitta is recipient of several recognitions including the Royal College of Surgeons fellowship in 2010 and the American University of Beirut Humanism and Professionalism award in 2015. He was granted the TRT World Citizen of the Year award and the TAKREEM Lifetime Achievement award 2023. In 2018, American University of Beirut's Bioethics and Professionalism program inaugurated The Ghassan Abu-Sittah Library in his honour.

== Bibliography ==
- The War Injured Child: From Point of Injury Treatment Through Management and Continuum of Care. Edited by Ghassan Soleiman Abu-Sittah, Jamal J. Hoballah. 1st ed. 2023. Cham, Switzerland: Springer, 2023. ISBN 978-3031286124
- Reconstructing the war Injured patient. Edited by Ghassan Soleiman Abu-Sittah, Jamal J. Hoballah, Joseph Bakhach. Cham, Switzerland : Springer, 2017. ISBN 978-3319568874

== Documentary films ==
- A Palestinian Surgeon's Return to Gaza (2003) - Journeyman Pictures
- Abu-Sittah was the subject of a film A State of Passion documenting his recollections from volunteering as a surgeon in Gaza; directed by Carol Mansour and Muna Khalid, it premiered at the 2024 Cairo International Film Festival.

Academic offices
Preceded by Rita Rae, Lady Rae	Rector of the University of Glasgow; 2024–present	Succeeded by Incumbent
