= Valerie Stacey, Lady Stacey =

Scottish lawyer and judge

The Honourable Lady Stacey
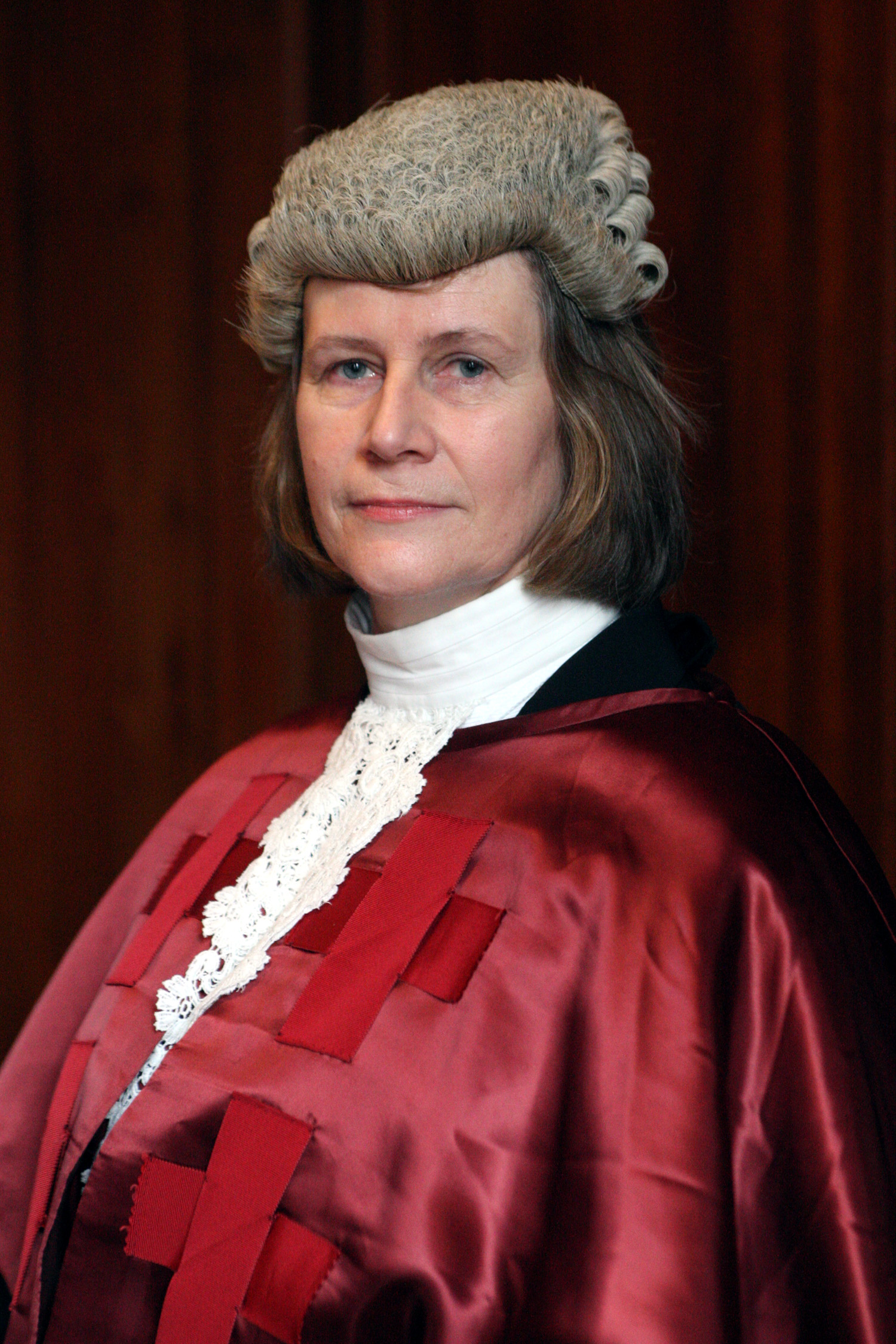

Senator of the College of Justice
- Incumbent
- Assumed office 5 November 2008
- Nominated by: Alex Salmond; As First Minister
- Appointed by: Elizabeth II
- Preceded by: Lord McEwan

Personal details
- Born: Valerie Elizabeth Thom; 25 May 1954 (age 72)
- Spouse: Andrew Stacey
- Education: University of Edinburgh
- Profession: Advocate
- Website: Scottish Courts Service

Valerie Elizabeth Stacey, Lady Stacey (born 1954) is a Scottish lawyer, and a Senator of the College of Justice, a judge of the country's Supreme Courts. She was the first woman ever elected Vice-Dean of the Faculty of Advocates.

== Early life ==
Born Valerie Thom, she was educated at Elgin Academy and studied at the School of Law of the University of Edinburgh. She worked as a solicitor from 1978 to 1986, and was admitted to the Faculty of Advocates in 1987. She married Andrew Stacey in 1981.

== Legal career ==
Stacey was appointed Advocate Depute in 1993, and Standing Junior Counsel to the Home Office in 1996. In 1997, while still at the Home Office, she was appointed a Temporary Sheriff. She demitted both these offices in 1999, and was appointed Queen's Counsel, returning to private practice. She was appointed a Special Advocate, having been vetted to work on certain cases. In 2004, she was elected Vice-Dean of the Faculty of Advocates, the first woman ever elected to this post. She stood in the election for Dean of the Faculty in 2007, but was defeated by Richard Keen QC. She was a member of the Sentencing Commission from 2003 to 2006, and of the Judicial Appointments Board for Scotland from 2005 to 2007. On 5 November 2008, it was announced she would be appointed to the Bench of the High Court of Justiciary and Court of Session, Scotland's Supreme Courts, in succession to Lord McEwan, who retired. She took the judicial title, Lady Stacey.

== Personal life ==
Thom married Andrew Stacey in 1981; the couple have two sons.

== See also ==
- List of Senators of the College of Justice
