= George Miller (cricketer) =

Scottish cricketer (1929–2016)

Personal information
- Born: 19 August 1929; Edinburgh, Scotland
- Died: 19 August 2016 (aged 87)
- Source: ESPNcricinfo, 6 January 2017

George Miller (19 August 1929 – 19 August 2016) was a Scottish cricketer. He played one first-class match for Scotland in 1955. He was also the secretary for the Scottish Cricket Union between 1966 and 1976.
