= Sarah P. L. Wolffe, Lady Wolffe =

American-Scottish judge

The Honourable The Hon Lady Wolffe
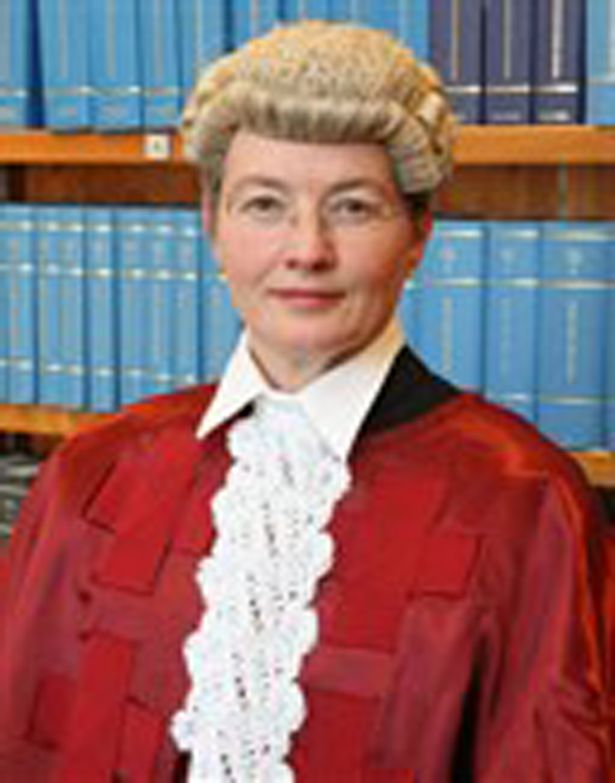
- Official portrait, 2014

Senator of the College of Justice
- In office 2014–2021
- Nominated by: Alex Salmond; As First Minister
- Appointed by: Elizabeth II

Personal details
- Born: Sarah Poyntell LaBudde Hanover, New Hampshire, U.S.A.
- Spouse: James Wolffe (m. 1987)
- Education: Dartmouth College; University of Edinburgh; Balliol College, Oxford

Sarah Poyntell LaBudde Wolffe, Lady Wolffe is an American-born Scottish lawyer and judge who is currently a Nominated Fellow of the Institute for Advacned Studies in the Humanities and an Honorary Professor (at the Law School), both at the University of Edinburgh. She previously served as Senator of the College of Justice from 2014 to 2021. Wolffe was the first US-born member of the Scottish judiciary and the first woman appointed as a Commercial Judge in the Court of Session.

== Early life ==
Sarah Poyntell LaBudde was born in the United States, where she earned a Bachelor of Arts at Dartmouth College in Hanover, New Hampshire. In 1987, she moved to England and studied at Balliol College, Oxford. The same year, she met James Wolffe and they married. They both moved to Edinburgh, Scotland, and she studied at the University of Edinburgh, gaining an LLB in 1989 and a Diploma in Legal Practice the following year.

== Early career ==
Wolffe then qualified as a solicitor in 1992. She became a member of the Faculty of Advocates in 1994. From 1996 to 2008 Wolffe was standing junior counsel to the Department of Trade and Industry and its successor departments. Since 2007 she acted as an ad hoc advocate depute. In 2008, she was appointed a Queen's Counsel.

== Senator of the College of Justice ==
=== Nomination and appointment ===
Wolffe became a member of the Outer House in March 2014.

=== Tenure ===
In September 2021, Wolffe announced her intention to step down as judge in the Court of Session.

== Academic and Professional career ==
On 8 September 2026, Wolffe took up a position at the Institute for Advanced Studies in the Humanities. She was previously a Professor of Practice at the University of Strathclyde's Law School, where she taught civil justice and commercial law. She is also an Honorary Professor of the University of Edinburgh.

Wolffe is a member of the Executive Committee of the Conference on European Restructuring and Insolvency Law ('CERIL'), based in Leiden, The Netherlands (appointed 2022) (https://www.ceril.eu/about-ceril/executive).

Wolffe is also the Senior Legal Chair of the Discipline Tribunals of the Financial Reporting Council (appointed in 2022)(https://www.frc.org.uk/about-us/tribunals/) and a Commissioner of the Marshall Aid Commemoration Commission (appointed 2022) (https://marshall-wpta.azurewebsites.net/the-commission/who-we-are/lady-sarah-wolffe/).

Wolffe rejoined Axiom Advocates in December 2025 (https://www.axiomadvocates.com/advocate/sarah/).

== Personal life ==
In 1987, she married James Wolffe KC, the Lord Advocate from 2016 to 2021. They have two sons.
