= Rita Rae, Lady Rae =

Scottish judge

The Honourable Lady Rae CBE, KC

Senator of the College of Justice
- In office 2014–2020
- Nominated by: Alex Salmond; As First Minister
- Appointed by: Elizabeth II

Personal details
- Born: Rita Emilia Anna Rae; 20 June 1950 (age 76) Glasgow, Scotland
- Education: University of Edinburgh

Rita Emilia Anna Rae, Lady Rae, CBE, KC (born 20 June 1950) is a Scottish lawyer, judge and a former Senator of the College of Justice.

== Career ==
Rae modelled herself on her grandfather, who was an Italian lawyer who opposed Mussolini and died in 1937.

Rae became a solicitor in 1974, joined the Faculty of Advocates from 1982, and was appointed a Queen's Counsel in 1992 (which changed to King's Counsel upon the death of Queen Elizabeth II on 8 September 2022).

From 2003 to 2006, Rae was a member of the Sentencing Commission for Scotland.

Rae served as a temporary sheriff from 1987 to 1997. She was appointed a sheriff at Glasgow in 1997. She became temporary judge at the Court of Session in 2004. From 2001 to 2007, she was a member (and vice-chair from 2005) of the Parole Board for Scotland.

Rae was appointed as a permanent judge (a Lord Ordinary) of the Court of Session and a Judge of the Supreme Courts in January 2014. She acted as a Temporary Judge in the Supreme Courts, part time, from 2010 – 2013.

In 2015, Lady Rae presided over the trial of Alexander Pacteau after his guilty plea to the murder of Karen Buckley in Glasgow. She retired in June 2020.

In June 2019, Lady Rae was awarded an Honorary Doctorate in Laws from the University of Glasgow.

On 21 April 2021, Rae was elected Rector of the University of Glasgow, succeeding Aamer Anwar.

On 11 April 2024, Rae was succeeded as Rector by Dr Ghassan Abu-Sittah.

In 2022, Rae Became first chair of the new Scottish Catholic Safeguarding Standards agency.

On 18 November 2022, Rae was awarded a Fellowship from New College Lanarkshire for her "Outstanding Contribution to Scottish Public Life".

In November 2023, Rae became Chair of the Council of the Scottish Association for the Study of Offending.

Rae was appointed as a Commander of the Order of the British Empire (CBE) in the 2026 New Year Honours list for services to for services to the Law, to Charity and to Education in Scotland.

== Bibliography ==
Academic offices
Preceded by Aamer Anwar	Rector of the University of Glasgow; 2021–2024	Succeeded by Ghassan Abu-Sittah
