= Ann Paton, Lady Paton =

Scottish advocate and judge (born 1952)

The Right Honourable Lady Paton
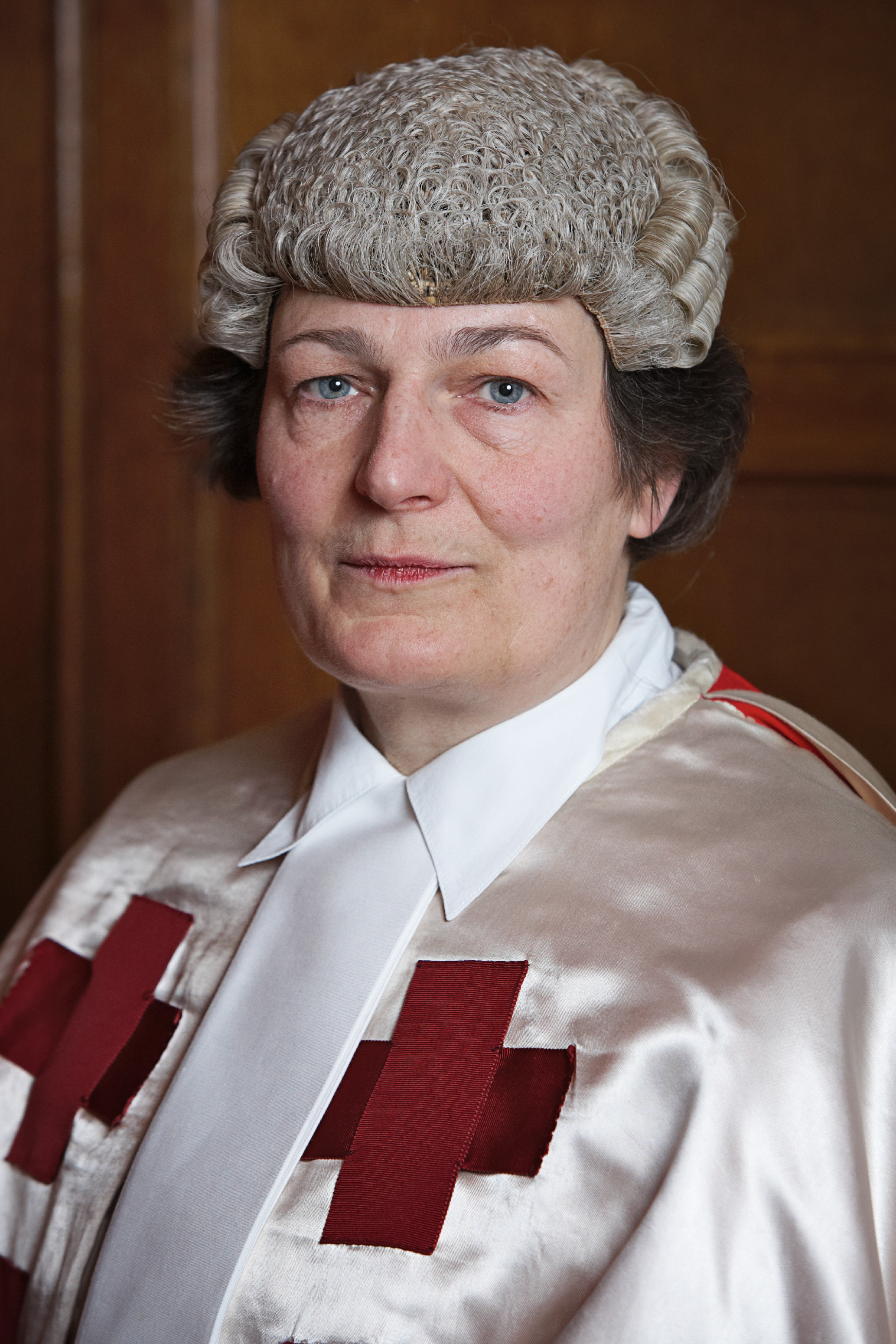
- Paton's official portrait from 2020

Senator of the College of Justice
- In office 2000 – 31 December 2025
- Nominated by: Donald Dewar; As First Minister
- Appointed by: Elizabeth II

Personal details
- Born: Ann McCargow; 1952 (age 73–74) Glasgow, Scotland
- Spouse: James Paton
- Education: University of Glasgow
- Profession: Advocate

Ann Paton, Lady Paton, PC (born 1952) is a retired Scottish advocate and judge. She was a Senator of the College of Justice, sitting in the High Court of Justiciary and the Inner House of the Court of Session. In 2019 she became the Chairman of the Scottish Law Commission and she retired from that post on 31 December 2025. Paton was the second woman ever appointed as a Senator of the College of Justice, after Lady Cosgrove.

== Early life ==
Born Ann McCargow in Glasgow in 1952, she was educated at the independent Laurel Bank School for Girls. She was dux in 1969. She studied at the University of Glasgow (M.A., LL.B.) and was awarded the John MacCormick Prize for the most distinguished law graduate of 1974. She married James Paton in 1974, and was admitted to the Faculty of Advocates in 1977.

== Legal career ==
Paton was appointed Standing Junior Counsel to the Queen's and Lord Treasurer's Remembrancer in 1979, and to the Office of Fair Trading in 1981. She took silk in 1990 and served as an Advocate Depute from 1992 to 1994. She was a member of the Working Party responsible for the 3rd edition of the Ogden Tables (1998). From 1995 to 2000, she was a member of the Criminal Injuries Compensation Board and Director of the Scottish Council of Law Reporting from 1995 until her appointment as a Judge. She was appointed a Senator of the College of Justice in 2000, a judge of the Supreme Courts of Scotland. She was promoted to the Inner House of the Court of Session in 2007, and appointed to the Privy Council. She sits in the Second Division.

Lady Paton was a member of the Parole Board for Scotland from 2003 until 2007. She chaired the Personal Injuries User Group in the Court of Session from 2003 to 2008. She chairs the Judicial Studies Working Party in Scotland responsible for the Scottish Equal Treatment Benchbook: Guidance for the Judiciary (1st edition 2002; 2nd edition 2008).

== Publications ==
Paton's first publication on joining the Scottish Bar was a Map of the Sheriffdoms and Sheriff Court Districts in Scotland, published by W. Green, Law Publishers in association with John Bartholomew & Son Ltd. She was Joint Assistant Editor of Gloag and Henderson, The Law of Scotland, from the 8th edition (1980) to the 10th edition (1995). In 1983, Paton co-authored A Casebook on Damages in Scotland with Robin McEwan, later a fellow judge as Lord McEwan. She undertook two subsequent revisions as sole author; the first in 1989, as Damages in Scotland, and the second in 1997, as Damages for Personal Injuries in Scotland. She continues as sole editor of the work which is now in loose leaf form. She was the author of the Faculty Digest 1971–80, a survey of cases decided in the Scottish Courts during that decade.

== Personal life ==
Lady Paton married Dr James Y. Paton in 1974; they have no children. Her interests include sailing, music and art.

== See also ==
- List of Senators of the College of Justice
