= Maggie Scott, Lady Scott =

Scottish lawyer and judge

The Honourable Lady Scott

Senator of the College of Justice
- Incumbent
- Assumed office 2012
- Nominated by: Alex Salmond; As First Minister
- Appointed by: Elizabeth II

Personal details
- Born: Margaret Elizabeth Scott; 1960 (age 65–66) Nairobi, Kenya
- Profession: Advocate
- Website: Judiciary of Scotland

Margaret Elizabeth Scott, Lady Scott (born 1960, Nairobi, Kenya) is a Scottish lawyer who was appointed a judge in 2012.

== Early life and education ==
Scott was born in 1960 in Nairobi, Kenya. She graduated from the University of Edinburgh with a Bachelor of Laws (LLB) degree and from the University of Strathclyde with a Diploma in Legal Practice (DipLP).

== Legal career ==
Scott was admitted as a solicitor in 1989, and she was called to the bar in Scotland (the Faculty of Advocates) in 1991. She "took silk" (became a Queen's Counsel) in 2002. She has acted as lead counsel in a number of high-profile appeal cases such as the Lockerbie bombing and the Glasgow Ice Cream Wars, in which she defended Abdelbaset al-Megrahi and Thomas "TC" Campbell, respectively. She was also successful in the appeal case of Kim Galbraith, whose murder conviction for shooting her policeman husband was reduced to diminished responsibility.

=== Megrahi's second appeal ===
On 6 November 2008, Scott applied to the Court of Criminal Appeal for Megrahi's release on bail pending the second appeal against his conviction at the Pan Am Flight 103 bombing trial in 2001. The three judges reserved their judgment on the application. A week later, Megrahi's bail application was refused. Megrahi was told he would remain in jail for the duration of his second appeal.

=== Judicial career ===
From 2003 to 2012, Scott was a part-time sheriff. On 2 November 2012, she was installed as a Senator of the College of Justice, taking the judicial title Lady Scott.

=== Controversy ===
Scott provoked public anger in July 2013 when sentencing a man convicted of several incidences of rape, as she appeared to praise him for having overcome his difficult background and succeeded at running a business. Her comment was viewed as inappropriate, with the Scottish Conservative Chief Whip John Lamont arguing that, "plenty of people have had tough lives ... but don’t rape anyone."

In March 2017, Scott granted a man who confessed to the rape of a 12-year-old child an absolute discharge. Although Scott acknowledged that Scottish law dictates an individual under the age of 13 is considered incapable of giving consent in any circumstance, she stated that the victim was not distressed and that all eyewitnesses believed her to be over 16. Rape Crisis England and Wales critiqued Scott's ruling, saying that, as a 12-year-old has no legal capacity to consent, sexual activity with them is always illegal. Moreover, it is an adult's responsibility to ensure that their partner is capable of giving consent. In a letter published after the trial, the victim claimed that she was unconscious at the time of the attack, further calling into question her ability to consent.

== Personal life ==
Scott's partner is Frank Richard Crowe, a sheriff. Together they have one son.
