= Hazel Cosgrove, Lady Cosgrove =

Scottish lawyer and judge

The Right Honourable Lady Cosgrove CBE
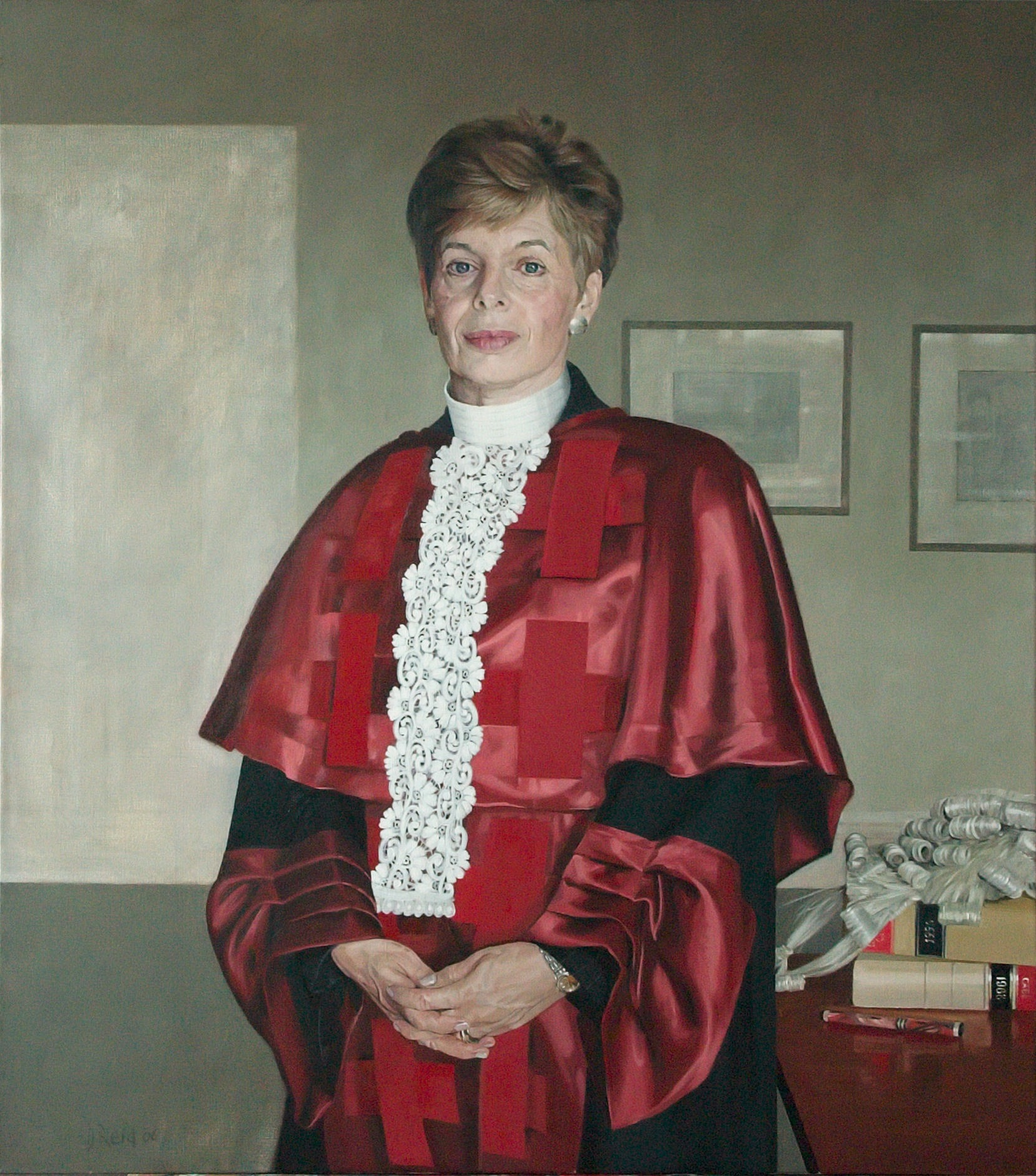
- Official portrait, 2000

Senator of the College of Justice
- In office 12 July 1996 – 24 March 2006
- Nominated by: John Major; As Prime Minister
- Appointed by: Elizabeth II

Personal details
- Born: Hazel Josephine Aronson; 12 January 1946 (age 80) Glasgow, Scotland
- Spouse: John Allan Cosgrove (m. 1967)
- Education: University of Glasgow
- Occupation: Judge
- Profession: Advocate

Hazel Josephine Cosgrove, Lady Cosgrove, CBE (née Aronson; born 12 January 1946), is a Scottish lawyer and judge who served as a Senator of the College of Justice from 1996 to 2006. She was the first woman appointed to the College of Justice.

Born and raised in Glasgow, Cosgrove graduated law at the University of Glasgow, becoming the first in her family to attend university. Admitted to the Faculty of Advocates in 1968, she served as Standing Junior Counsel to the Department of Trade from 1977 to 1979 and became the first woman to serve as a Sheriff judge of Glasgow and Strathkelvin in 1979. She was a member of the Parole Board for Scotland from 1988 to 1991. In 1991, she was appointed to the Queen's Counsel. Cosgrove went on to serve as a Sheriff of Lothian and Borders at Edinburgh from 1983 to 1996. From 1992 to 1996, she was a temporary judge in the High Court of Justiciary and Court of Session.

In 1996, a vacancy was made in the College of Justice and Cosgrove was nominated by Prime Minister John Major to be appointed a Senator of the College of Justice. She was appointed on 12 July 1996, becoming the first female to be appointed a Senator. She used the judicial title, Lady Cosgrove. As a Senator, Cosgrove was one of seven judges who rewrote the rape law in Scotland in 2002. She was Deputy Chairman of the Boundary Commission for Scotland from 1997 to 2006. In 2003, she was the first woman to be appointed to the Inner House of the Court of Session. Cosgrove retired as judge in 2006.

Cosgrove received an CBE to her services the criminal justice system in Scotland. Having once been told "the bar is no place for a woman", she broke the 'glass ceiling' in Scotland's legal profession and has always encouraged other women to follow in her footsteps, advocating equality for women through her own achievements.

== Early life ==
Hazel Josephine Aronson was born on 2 January 1946 in Glasgow, the daughter of Moses Aron Aronson and Julia Tobias. She is of Ashkenazi Jewish origin with Russian-Jewish ancestry (all of her 4 grandparents lived in the Pale of Settlement and fled due to constant pogroms). She was educated at Glasgow High School for Girls. Cosgrove studied at the School of Law of the University of Glasgow, graduating LL.B. in 1966, the first in her family to attend university.

== Legal career ==
In 1968, Cosgrove was admitted to the Faculty of Advocates. When she revealed to other members of the legal profession, which was dominantly male, she wanted to become an advocate, she was told "the bar is no place for a woman". She used her maiden name, Aronson, until 1996 after the judiciary preferred for her to use her maiden name, however, she thought otherwise.

Cosgrove served as Standing Junior Counsel to the Department of Trade from 1977 to 1979, and took silk to become a Queen's Counsel in 1991. She was the first woman to serve as a Sheriff of Glasgow and Strathkelvin from 1979 to 1983 and of Lothian and Borders at Edinburgh from 1983 to 1996. She was a member of the Parole Board for Scotland from 1988 to 1991, Chairman of the Mental Welfare Commission from 1991 to 1996, and Chairman of the Expert Panel on Sex Offending from 1997 to 2001.

== Senator of the College of Justice ==
=== Appointment ===
"The public must have confidence that its legal system is representative of and has the ability to respond to and deal with the needs and problems of all of its citizens. A profession which is not truly representative of all of its citizens cannot enjoy that confidence. The increasing presence of women in the profession will, I believe, be a positive force."

— Lady Cosgrove speaks to students at Strathclyde University

In 1992, Cosgrove served as a temporary judge for the Court of Session and High Court. After a vacancy was held in 1996, she was nominated by Prime Minister John Major to be appointed as a Senator of the College of Justice. She was appointed on 12 July 1996, becoming the first woman to be appointed as a judge in College of Justice. She used the judicial title, Lady Cosgrove.

=== Tenure ===
In February 2003, Lady Cosgrove was appointed to the Inner House of the Court of Session and sworn of Her Majesty's Privy Council. She received a CBE in 2004 for services to the criminal justice system in Scotland, and has also been awarded honorary degrees from a number of institutions. Lady Cosgrove retired as a Senator of the College of Justice on 24 March 2006 shortly after her 60th birthday, however she still sits on the bench occasionally when there is a shortage of judges.

== Personal life ==
Cosgrove now lives in London with her husband John Cosgrove, a retired dental surgeon, the son of Dr Isaac Cosgrove, Glasgow Rabbi and Freemason. They have two children: a son and a daughter. She has a younger sister Danielle who is a solicitor.
