= Angus Stewart, Lord Stewart =

Scottish lawyer and judge

The Honourable Lord Stewart

Senator of the College of Justice
- In office 5 November 2010 – 14 December 2016
- Nominated by: Alex Salmond; As First Minister
- Monarch: Elizabeth II
- Succeeded by: Lord Mulholland

Personal details
- Born: Angus Stewart
- Education: Balliol College, Oxford; University of Edinburgh
- Profession: Advocate

Angus Stewart, Lord Stewart is a Scottish lawyer and retired judge. From 2010 to 2016 he was a Senator of the College of Justice, a judge of the Supreme Courts of Scotland.

== Early life and education ==
Stewart was born in Campbeltown and educated at Dalintober Primary School and the Edinburgh Academy.

He studied at Balliol College, Oxford (BA), and the School of Law of the University of Edinburgh (LL.B.) and was admitted to the Faculty of Advocates in 1975.

== Legal career ==
Stewart served as Standing Junior Counsel to the Department of Environment from 1983 to 1988, when he was appointed Queen's Counsel. The following year, he was appointed a Temporary Sheriff. He was Keeper of the Advocates' Library from 1994 to 2002 and Chairman of the Scottish Council of Law Reporting from 1997 to 2001. He edited two of the four volumes of the Faculty of Advocates Minute Book, published in 1999 and 2008 respectively by the Stair Society. He was Senior Advocate Depute from 2005 to 2007 and Leading Counsel to the Billy Wright Inquiry in Northern Ireland, from 2008 to 2010. The inquiry, chaired by Scottish judge Lord MacLean, investigated claims of collusion between prison authorities and the paramilitary Irish National Liberation Army in the death of Loyalist Volunteer Force leader Billy Wright in the Maze Prison in 1997.

On 14 October 2010, the Scottish Government announced that the Queen, on the recommendation of the First Minister, Alex Salmond, had appointed Stewart a Senator of the College of Justice, a judge of the country's supreme courts, the High Court of Justiciary and Court of Session. He took up the office on 5 November 2010 with the judicial title, Lord Stewart.

He retired from the College of Justice on 14 December 2016, on his 70th birthday. Frank Mulholland, a former Lord Advocate, was appointed to the college in his place.

== See also ==
- Senator of the College of Justice
