= James Wolffe =

Former Lord Advocate; 2016–2021

The Right Honourable James Wolffe KC FRSE FSAScot FRIAS
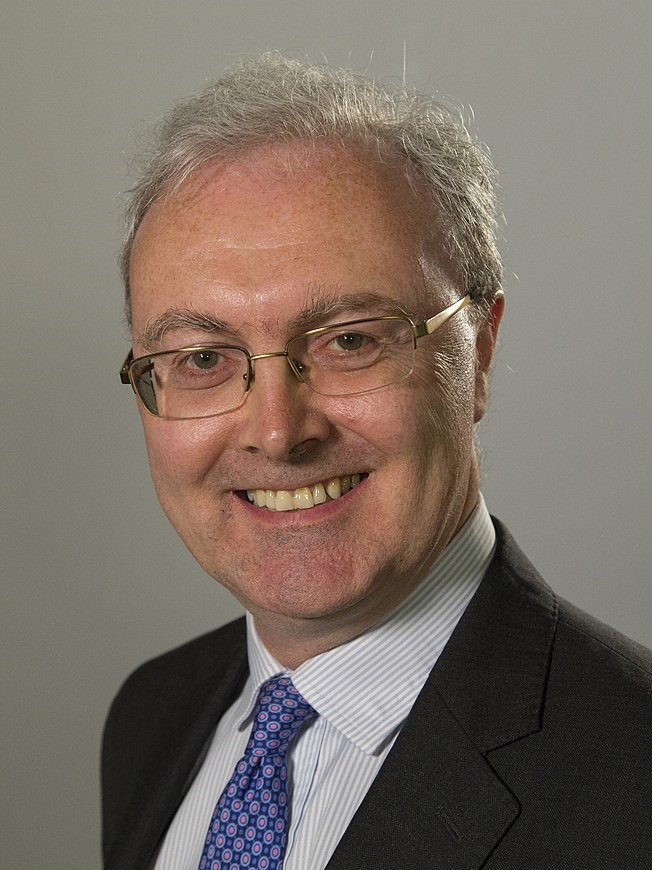
- Official portrait, 2016

Lord Advocate
- In office 1 June 2016 – 22 June 2021
- Monarch: Elizabeth II
- First Minister: Nicola Sturgeon
- Solicitor General: Alison Di Rollo KC
- Preceded by: Frank Mulholland KC
- Succeeded by: Dorothy Bain KC

Personal details
- Born: Walter James Wolffe; 20 December 1962 (age 63) Dumfries, Scotland
- Party: Independent
- Spouse: Lady Wolffe
- Children: 2 sons
- Education: University of Edinburgh; Balliol College, Oxford
- Occupation: Advocate
- Profession: Lawyer

Walter James Wolffe KC FRSE FSAScot FRIAS (born 20 December 1962) is a Scottish advocate who served as Lord Advocate from 2016 to 2021. He previously served as Dean of the Faculty of Advocates from 2014 to 2016, and Vice-Dean of the Faculty of Advocates from 2013 to 2014.

== Early life ==
Walter James Wolffe was born on 20 December 1962 in Dumfries to Alexandra L. Graham and Antony Curtiss Wolffe MBE. He attended Gatehouse of Fleet Primary School and then Kirkcudbright Academy. Wolffe studied at the University of Edinburgh, graduating with an honours degree in law and a diploma in legal practice. He then went on to study at Balliol College, Oxford to take a Bachelor of Civil Law degree.

== Legal career ==
=== Early career ===
Wolffe trained as a solicitor at a commercial firm in Edinburgh. After qualifying, he worked as Legal Assistant to the Lord President of the Court of Session. After working for a year at Parliament House, Wolffe was admitted as an advocate in 1992. He served as First Standing Junior Counsel to the Scottish Government from 2002 to 2007. Wolffe took silk in 2007, earning the post nominal of QC. He spent ten years practicing in commercial and public law, before serving as full-time prosecutor as Advocate Depute at the High Court of Justiciary from 2007 to 2010.

Wolffe has been instructed for cases at all levels, including the Supreme Court of the United Kingdom, the Judicial Committee of the Privy Council and the European Court of Human Rights. He has been called to the bar of England & Wales in 2013.

=== Dean of the Faculty of Advocates; 2014 to 2016 ===
Wolffe was elected Vice-Dean of the Faculty of Advocates in February 2013. In February 2014, he was elected Dean of the Faculty of Advocates, replacing Richard Keen. Wolffe was the winner of an election defeating Gordon Jackson QC, Andrew Smith QC and Alan Summers QC. Wolffe is the first Dean to be elected by an electronic vote. Following his election he responded: "It is a great honour to be elected by the Faculty as its Dean. The people of Scotland have been well served by the independent Bar throughout its existence. I look forward to leading the profession during the next chapter of its history."

== Lord Advocate ==
On 31 May 2016 the Scottish Government announced that First Minister Nicola Sturgeon had recommended Wolffe to the Scottish Parliament for appointment as Lord Advocate by the Queen. His appointment was confirmed by the Scottish Parliament on 1 June 2016.

In 2020, Wolffe informed the Scottish Government of his intention to step down as Scotland's Lord Advocate after the May 2021 Scottish Parliament election. Prior to Nicola Sturgeon's re-election as First Minister, it was confirmed that both Wolffe and Solicitor General Alison Di Rollo, would resign as Scotland's law officers.

== Awards and honours ==
Wolffe had the following awards and honours:

- Member of the Privy Council (16 November 2016);
- Queen's Counsel (which became King's Counsel on 8 September 2022 upon the death of Queen Elizabeth II and the accession of King Charles III);
- Fellow of the Royal Society of Edinburgh (FRSE);
- Honorary LLD, Glasgow University;
- Fellow of the Society of Antiquaries of Scotland (FSAScot);
- Fellow of the European Law Institute;
- Honorary Fellow of the Royal Incorporation of Architects in Scotland (FRIAS);
- Honorary Bencher, King's Inns, Dublin

== Personal life ==
Wolffe married Sarah Poyntell LaBudde, in 1987, a Senator of the College of Justice in the Supreme Courts of Scotland. They have two sons.

Legal offices
Preceded by Frank Mulholland	Lord Advocate; 2016–2021	Succeeded by Dorothy Bain
