= Colin Sutherland, Lord Carloway =

Scottish advocate and judge

The Right Honourable Lord Carloway FRSE
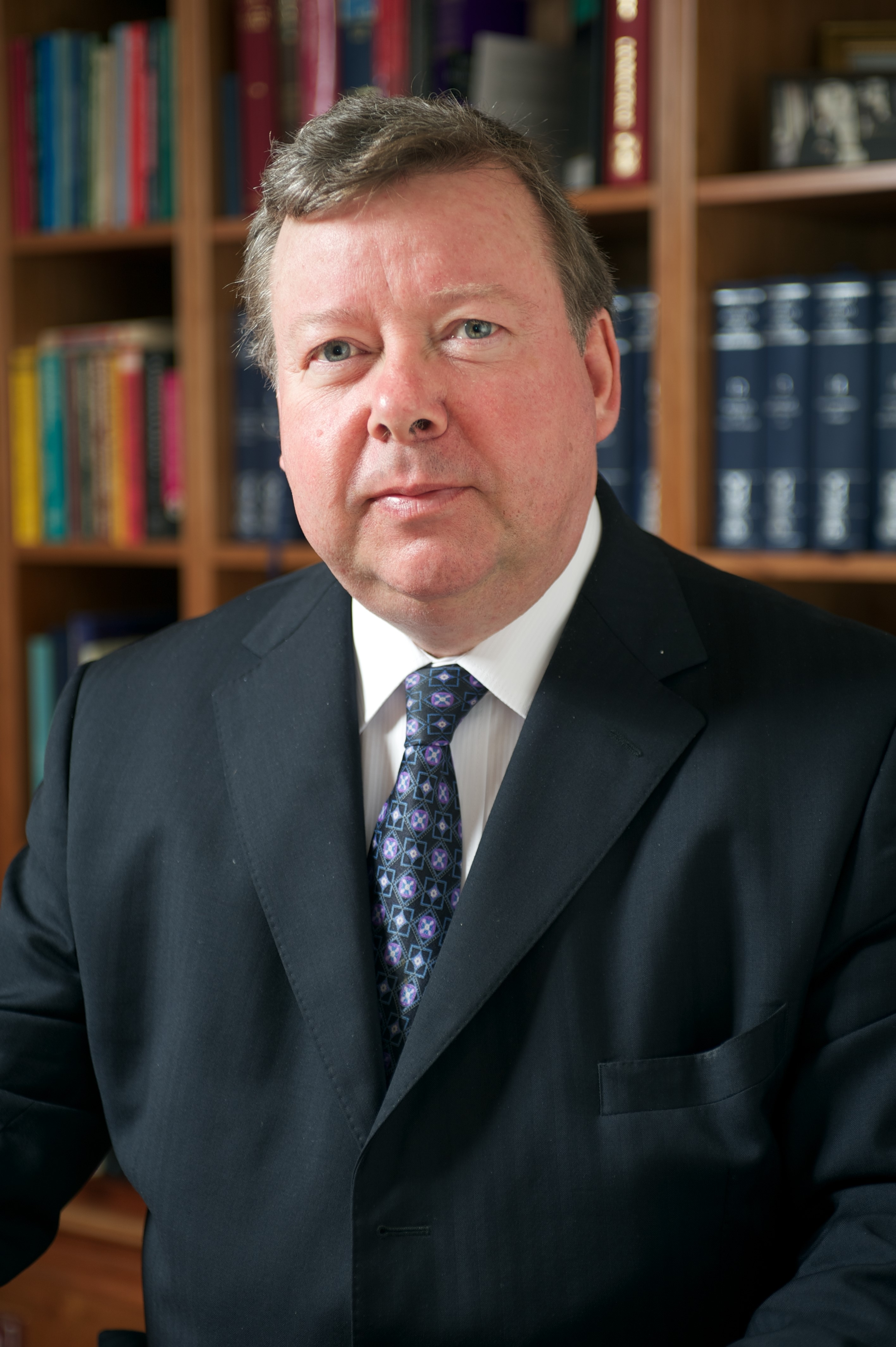

Lord President of the Court of Session Lord Justice General
- In office 18 December 2015 – 3 February 2025
- Nominated by: Nicola Sturgeon; As First Minister
- Appointed by: Elizabeth II
- Deputy: Lady Dorrian
- Preceded by: Lord Gill
- Succeeded by: Lord Pentland

Lord Justice Clerk
- In office 15 August 2012 – 18 December 2015
- Nominated by: Alex Salmond; As First Minister
- Appointed by: Elizabeth II
- Preceded by: Lord Gill
- Succeeded by: Lady Dorrian

Senator of the College of Justice
- In office February 2000 – 3 February 2025
- Nominated by: Donald Dewar; As First Minister
- Monarch: Elizabeth II

Personal details
- Born: 20 May 1954 (age 72) Falkirk, Scotland
- Spouse: Jane Turnbull
- Education: University of Edinburgh
- Profession: Advocate

Colin John MacLean Sutherland, Lord Carloway (born 20 May 1954) is a Scottish advocate and judge who served as the Lord President of the Court of Session and Lord Justice General from 2015 until his retirement in February 2025. He was previously Lord Justice Clerk from 2012 to 2015 and was a Senator of the College of Justice from February 2000 until his retirement. On 4 June 2024, Lord Carloway announced his intention to retire from judicial office in early 2025.

Born in Falkirk, Lord Carloway studied at the University of Edinburgh's Law School, where he earned a Bachelor of Laws. In 1977, he was admitted to the Faculty of Advocates and served as an Advocate Depute in the late 1980s. Before being nominated as a Judge in 2000, he served as the Treasurer of the Faculty of Advocates. As a Senator of the College of Justice he presided over the 2004 prosecution of gas transporter Transco and published the Carloway Review. In 2012, Lord Gill, who had served as the Lord Justice Clerk, was appointed the Lord President and Lord Carloway succeeded him.

Following the retirement of Lord Gill, Lord Carloway was nominated by First Minister Nicola Sturgeon to succeed him. He was officially appointed by Queen Elizabeth II on 18 December 2015, becoming the most senior judge in Scotland.

== Early life ==
Colin John MacLean Sutherland was born, on 20 May 1954, in Falkirk. He was educated at Hurst Grange Preparatory School in Stirling and the Edinburgh Academy, before studying at the School of Law of the University of Edinburgh (LL.B. (Hons)).

== Career ==
=== As advocate ===
Sutherland was admitted to the Faculty of Advocates in 1977, and appointed Advocate Depute in 1986, serving until 1989. He became Queen's Counsel in 1990 and was Treasurer of the Faculty of Advocates from 1994 to 2000.

=== As Judge ===
==== In the Court of Session 2000 onwards ====
Sutherland was appointed a Senator of the College of Justice, a judge of the Court of Session and High Court of Justiciary, Scotland's Supreme Courts, in February 2000. He took the judicial title, Lord Carloway, and was promoted to the Inner House of the Court of Session and appointed to the Privy Council in 2008.

Lord Carloway presided over the 2004 prosecution of gas transporter Transco under health and safety legislation for an explosion in Larkhall in December 1999 which killed a family of four, fining the company a record £15m. After 2008 he was almost exclusively involved in appellate work as a member of the Second Division, one of the two appeal court chambers in Scotland, chaired by the Lord Justice Clerk.

==== Lord Justice Clerk 2012–2015 ====
Lord Carloway was appointed Lord Justice Clerk on 15 August 2012.

==== Lord President and Lord Justice General 2015–2025 ====
Lord Carloway's appointment as Lord President and Lord Justice General was announced on 18 December 2015. He stepped down from the post on 3 February 2025.

In December 2022, as Lord President of the Court of Session, Lord Carloway unveiled a plaque commemorating the 1778 Knight v. Wedderburn case, which ruled that slavery was incompatible with Scots law.

== The Carloway Review ==
In October 2010, Lord Carloway was asked by the then Justice Secretary Kenny MacAskill to undertake a review of the Scottish criminal law following the decision by the UK Supreme Court in the case of Cadder v HM Advocate. The report was released in November 2011 and became known as the Carloway Review. The Report did not immediately lead to the recommended abolition of the requirement for corroboration owing to considerable judicial opposition.

== Publications ==
He is an assistant editor of Green’s Litigation Styles and contributed the chapters on "Court of Session Practice" to the Stair Memorial Encyclopaedia and "Expenses" in Court of Session Practice.

== Personal life ==
Lord Carloway married Jane Turnbull in 1988, with whom he has two sons. He was the joint editor of Parliament House Portraits: the Art Collection of the Faculty of Advocates, and is a former president of the Scottish Arts Club. He is the lead vocalist in, and plays bass guitar for, the Faculty of Advocates band, The Reclaimers.

== Honours ==
Lord Carloway is an Honorary Bencher of Lincoln's Inn in London and King's Inn in Dublin, and is a Fellow of the Royal Society of Edinburgh (FRSE).

== See also ==
- Corroboration in Scots law
- List of Senators of the College of Justice

Legal offices
Preceded by Lord Gill	Lord Justice Clerk; 2012–2015	Succeeded by Lady Dorrian
Preceded by Lord Gill	Lord President of the Court of Session and Lord Justice General; 2015–2025	Succeeded by Lord Pentland
Order of precedence in Scotland
Preceded by Lord Nicholas Windsor as Son of the Duke of Kent	Gentlemen as Lord President	Succeeded by Lord Mackay of Clashfern as Lord Clerk Register
