= Leeona Dorrian, Lady Dorrian =

Scottish advocate and judge

The Right Honourable Lady Dorrian PC, KC
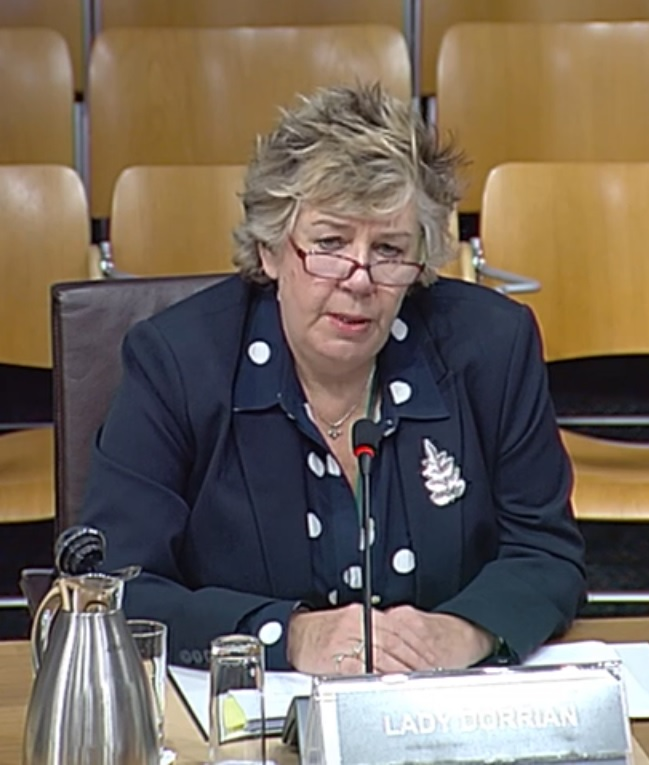
- Dorrian before the Scottish Parliament, 2018

Lord Justice Clerk
- In office 13 April 2016 – 3 February 2025
- Appointed by: Elizabeth II
- Preceded by: Lord Carloway
- Succeeded by: Lord Beckett

Senator of the College of Justice
- In office 2005 – 3 February 2025
- Nominated by: Jack McConnell; As First Minister
- Monarchs: Elizabeth II; Charles III

Personal details
- Born: Leeona June Dorrian; 16 June 1957 (age 69) Edinburgh, Scotland
- Education: University of Aberdeen
- Occupation: Judge
- Profession: Advocate

Leeona June Dorrian, Lady Dorrian PC, KC (born 16 June 1957) is a Scottish advocate and judge who served as the Lord Justice Clerk from 2016 until her retirement from judicial office on 3 February 2025. She was the first woman to hold the position of Lord Justice Clerk. She was a Senator of the College of Justice from 2005 until her retirement in 2025, having served as a temporary judge for three years prior.

== Early life ==
Dorrian was born in Edinburgh and educated at Cranley Girls' School in the city. She studied at the School of Law of the University of Aberdeen, graduating LL.B. in 1977, and was admitted to the Faculty of Advocates in 1981.

== Early career ==
Dorrian served as Standing Junior Counsel to the Health and Safety Executive and Commission between 1987 and 1994, Advocate Depute between 1988 and 1991, and as Standing Junior to the Department of Energy between 1991 and 1994. She was appointed Queen's Counsel in 1994, and called to the English Bar in 1991, at the Inner Temple. Between 1997 and 2001 she was a member of the Criminal Injuries Compensation Board.

== College of Justice ==
Dorrian was appointed a Temporary Judge of the Court of Session in 2002, and in 2005 became a full-time Senator of the College of Justice, taking the judicial title, Lady Dorrian. She was promoted to the Inner House in 2012.

Lady Dorrian became a member of The Management Board of The Aberdeen Law Project in 2010. She was elected a Fellow of the Royal Society of Edinburgh in 2022.

=== Lord Justice Clerk ===
In April 2016, Lady Dorrian was appointed as Lord Justice Clerk, succeeding Lord Carloway who had been promoted to Lord President of the Court of Session. She was the first woman to serve as Lord Justice Clerk, and at the time of her appointment was one of nine women out of thirty one judges in Scotland.

Lady Dorrian was involved in the 2021 trial of former First Minister, Alex Salmond for sexual misconduct for which he was acquitted. She also permitted the application for a ban on publication of the names of the complainers in that trial and a ban on the publication of any material that could identify any complainer. Blogger and former British ambassador to Uzbekistan, Craig Murray, was jailed for eight months in 2021 for providing information in his blog that may have allowed readers to identify some of the complainers by "jigsaw identification". This incarceration, wherein Lady Dorrian delivered the "Opinion of the Court", caused some media attention.

== See also ==
- List of Senators of the College of Justice

Legal offices
Preceded by Lord Carloway	Lord Justice Clerk; 2016–2025	Succeeded by Lord Beckett
