= List of tribunals in the United Kingdom =

List of specialist courts in the United Kingdom

This is a list of tribunals currently in existence in the United Kingdom.

== Two-tier system ==
Together, the two general tribunals may be known as the 'two-tier system'.

=== First-tier Tribunal ===
The First-tier Tribunal hears appeals from regulators and decision-makers in a wide range of subject areas, currently:

- Alternative business structures (licensed conveyancers)
- Charity
- Claims management services
- Consumer credit
- Environmental sanctions
- Estate agents
- Examination boards
- Gambling
- Immigration services
- Freedom of information and data protection
- Local government standards
- Transport
- Asylum support
- Social security and child support
- Criminal injuries compensation
- Care standards
- Mental health
- Special educational needs and disability
- Primary health lists
- Tax
- MPs' expenses
- War pensions and armed forces compensation
- Immigration and asylum

==== Chambers of the First-Tier Tribunal ====
The First-Tier Tribunal is divided into 7 chambers:

- General Regulatory Chamber
- Social Entitlement Chamber
- Health, Education and Social Care Chamber
- Tax Chamber
- War Pensions and Armed Forces Compensation Chamber
- Immigration and Asylum Chamber
- Property Chamber

=== Upper Tribunal ===
The Upper Tribunal hears appeals from the First-tier Tribunal and also from the:

- Independent Safeguarding Authority
- Traffic commissioners
- Financial Conduct Authority
- Pension Regulator
- Welsh devolved tribunals

== Devolved tribunals ==
A number of tribunals exercise functions devolved to the devolved administrations. These tribunals as such replace the functions of UK-wide tribunals in their subject area for their jurisdiction.

=== Scotland ===
Scotland has a number of tribunals administered by the Scottish Courts and Tribunals Service, as well as some with their own administration.

==== Scottish two-tier tribunals ====
Scotland has upper and first-tier tribunals, which mirror the UK-wide system (though their remits differ). The Upper Tribunal for Scotland acts as an appeal tribunal equivalent to the Outer House, whilst the First-tier Tribunal for Scotland hears cases at first instance or on appeal from local authorities.

==== Other SCTS tribunals ====
- Mental Health Tribunal for Scotland
- Pensions Appeals Tribunal
- Lands Tribunal for Scotland

==== NHS Scotland tribunals ====
The NHS Tribunal Scotland handles cases referred by Health Boards of fraud and other misconduct by medical, dental, ophthalmic or pharmaceutical practitioners, and considers whether the practitioner should be disqualified from working in the NHS in Scotland.

The National Appeal Panel considers appeals against decisions taken by Health Boards in Scotland on applications to provide NHS pharmaceutical services.

==== Other Scottish tribunals ====
The Crofters Commission regulates crofting in the Scottish Highlands and Islands.

Children's Hearings took over, from the Scottish courts, most of the responsibility for dealing with children and young people under 16, and in some cases under 18, who commit offences or who are in need of care and protection.

=== Wales ===
Wales maintains several tribunals under the President of Welsh Tribunals. These are:

- Adjudication Panel for Wales
- Agricultural Land Tribunal for Wales
- Mental Health Review Tribunals for Wales
- Special Educational Needs Tribunal for Wales
- Residential Property Tribunal for Wales
- Welsh Language Tribunal - deal with appeals against decisions by the Welsh Language Commissioner in relation to Welsh Language Standards.

The Valuation Tribunal for Wales is self-administered.

=== England ===
Though not England-only tribunals are not technically 'devolved' as such, they act similarly.

The Valuation Tribunal for England hears disputes related to council tax and business rate valuations on appeals from councils.

NHS England's NHS Resolution FHS Appeal Unit hears, on behalf of the Secretary of State for Health, appeals from decisions of primary care trusts regarding applications to provide NHS pharmaceutical services in England, and also decides contractual disputes between primary care trusts and general practitioners, dentists or opticians.

=== London ===
Formerly named the Parking and Traffic Appeals Service, Parking adjudicators hear parking appeals against fixed penalty notices issued for parking, bus lane and various traffic sign contraventions within Greater London.

== Education ==
=== School admission appeal panels ===
School admission appeal panels are set up by local education authorities or school governing bodies to hear appeals against a child's non-admission to their preferred school, or against the school place allotted to them.

=== School exclusion appeal panels ===
School exclusion appeal panels are set up by local education authorities or school governing bodies to hear appeals against decisions to exclude a child from school.

=== Schools adjudicators ===
Schools adjudicators decide on objections to published admission arrangements for admitting children to schools, and decide on statutory proposals for school organisation.

== Employment ==
=== Employment tribunals ===
Employment tribunals hear claims regarding employment including unfair dismissal, redundancy payments and discrimination. They deal with other claims relating to wages and other payments.

=== Employment Appeal Tribunal ===
The Employment Appeal Tribunal hears appeals from the employment tribunals.

=== Police Appeals Tribunal ===
The Police Appeals Tribunal hears appeals against the findings of internal disciplinary proceedings brought against members of the police force.

=== Reserve forces appeal tribunals ===
Reserve forces appeal tribunals hear appeals from members of the United Kingdom reserve forces (the Army Reserve, the Royal Auxiliary Air Force, the Royal Naval Reserve and the Royal Marines Reserve), or their civilian employers, against decisions on exemption from call-out to active service or regarding financial assistance.

=== Reserve forces reinstatement committees and umpires ===
Reserve forces reinstatement committees hear applications from members of the United Kingdom reserve forces (the Army Reserve, the Royal Auxiliary Air Force, the Royal Naval Reserve and the Royal Marines Reserve) who consider that they have been refused their right to return to their civilian job following demobilisation. Umpires hear appeals on determinations or orders of the committees.

== Finance and commerce ==
=== Company Names Tribunal ===
The Company Names Tribunal makes decisions in disputes about opportunistic company name or limited liability partnership name registrations, when someone registers one or more variations of the name of a well-known company in order to get that company to buy the registration from them.

=== Competition Appeal Tribunal ===
The Competition Appeal Tribunal hears appeals against decisions of the Competition and Markets Authority (including its predecessor bodies, the Competition Commission and the Office of Fair Trading), Ofcom, Ofgem, Ofwat, the Office of Rail Regulation or the Secretary of State for Business and Trade, under the Competition Act 1998, the Enterprise Act 2002, the Energy Act 2004 or related regulations. It also hears appeals of decisions of the Civil Aviation Authority under the Civil Aviation Act 2012; the Payment Systems Regulator under the Payment Services Regulations 2009, Financial Services (Banking Reform) Act 2013 and the Payment Card Interchange Fee Regulations 2015; and about decisions under the Subsidy Control Act 2022.

=== Foreign Compensation Commission ===
The Foreign Compensation Commission assessed the amount of compensation British claimants were entitled to receive under international and British law for losses suffered abroad. It closed on 29 March 2013.

=== Office of Fair Trading adjudicators ===
Office of Fair Trading adjudicators hears representations made by consumer credit licence applicants or holders against a notice that the OFT is minded to refuse, revoke or suspend their licence, and also from estate agents who have been notified that the OFT is considering issuing a warning or prohibition order against them.

== Health and care ==
=== Gender Recognition Panel ===
The Gender Recognition Panel assesses applications from transgender people for legal recognition of the gender in which they now live.

=== Medical practitioners tribunals ===
Medical practitioners tribunals, organised by the Medical Practitioners Tribunal Service, make decision about the fitness to practice of doctors. The MPTS was set up in 2012 to separate the adjudication function of the General Medical Council from its investigatory function.

=== Misuse of Drugs Tribunal ===
The Misuse of Drugs Tribunal considers whether there are grounds for prohibiting a health care practitioner from prescribing controlled drugs. The Tribunal has not sat for many years.

=== Primary care trust discipline committees ===
Primary care trust discipline committees investigate disciplinary matters against various primary health care professionals.

== Intellectual property ==
=== Comptroller-General of Patents, Designs and Trade Marks ===
The Comptroller (also known as the Registrar of Trade Marks or Designs) can decide disputes relating to trade marks, patents and registered and unregistered designs.

=== Controller of Plant Variety Rights ===
The Controller of Plant Variety Rights considers applications for plant variety rights, and hears representations from others who may be affected by the grant of such rights before making a final decision.

=== Copyright Tribunal ===
The Copyright Tribunal decides disputes about the terms and conditions of licences offered by, or licensing schemes operated by, collective licensing bodies in the copyright and related rights area.

=== Plant Varieties and Seeds Tribunal ===
The Plant Varieties and Seeds Tribunal hears appeals against decisions of the Controller of Plant Variety Rights regarding plant variety rights, against decisions of the Agriculture Ministers on the listing of new varieties of the main agricultural and vegetable species and seeds certification, and against the decisions of the Forestry Commissioners on matters concerning forest reproduction materials.

== Property and land ==
=== Adjudicator to HM Land Registry ===
The Adjudicators to HM Land Registry deal with disputes arising from applications to register, or change the registration of, land in England and Wales.

=== Agricultural arbitrators ===
Agricultural arbitrators settle disputes between agricultural landlords and tenants, mostly relating to rent reviews.

=== Agricultural land tribunals ===
The agricultural land tribunals deal with issues relating to agricultural tenancies, and drainage disputes between neighbours.

=== Commons commissioners ===
Commons commissioners decide disputes about the registration of common land.

=== Forestry committees ===
Forestry committees deal with appeals against refusals by the Forestry Commissioners to grant a felling licence or the replanting conditions attached to a felling licence, or against a restocking notice or a felling direction served by the Forestry Commissioners.

=== Planning inquiries ===
The Planning Inspectorate hears appeals against planning decisions by local authorities, and against enforcement action. It also decides appeals on a range of similar matters, such as tree preservation orders or rights of way orders which have been objected to.

== Pensions ==
=== Board of the Pension Protection Fund ===
The Board of the Pension Protection Fund considers applications for compensation to occupational pension schemes, with insolvent employers, that suffer a loss that can be attributable to an offence involving fraud or dishonesty.

=== Pensions Ombudsman and Pension Protection Fund Ombudsman ===
The Pensions Ombudsman makes binding determinations on complaints concerning occupational and personal pension schemes.

The Pension Protection Fund Ombudsman can review certain decisions of the Pension Protection Fund and also deals with appeals from decisions of the Financial Assistance Scheme.

=== Pensions Regulator ===
The Determinations Panel of the Pensions Regulator decides whether to impose sanctions where an investigation has identified breaches of the law or codes of practice relating to pensions, and also considers applications for the Pensions Regulator to use its powers.

=== Police and fire fighters pensions appeals tribunals ===
The Police Pensions Appeals Tribunal hears appeals against decisions of police authorities to refuse to grant a pension, or to grant a smaller pension than is claimed.

The Fire Fighters Pensions Appeals Tribunal performs a similar role.

== Transport ==
=== Civil Aviation Authority ===
Panels of members of the Civil Aviation Authority hear appeals regarding refusals to grant, or variations or revocations of, an aerodrome licence, an air operator's certificate, an air traffic controller's licence, approval for a person to provide an air traffic control service, a certificate of airworthiness or a permit to fly, approval of equipment for use on board an aircraft or in the provision of an air traffic control service, a maintenance engineer's licence and a pilot's licence.

== Traffic ==
=== Road User Charging Adjudicator Tribunal ===
Road User Charging Adjudicators hear appeals against congestion charging and low emission zone penalties in Greater London.

=== Traffic commissioners ===
The traffic commissioners license operators of heavy goods vehicles and public service vehicles (buses), grant vocational licences to drivers of such vehicles, and register local bus services; they also take action against operators and drivers where the required standards are not met, and can fine bus companies where services do not run on time.

=== Traffic Penalty Tribunal (including Bus Lane Adjudicators) ===
The Traffic Penalty Tribunal decides appeals against parking and bus lane penalties issued in England (outside London) and Wales. It was created by statutory instrument to fulfil provisions of the Traffic Management Act 2004, it is partly responsible to the PATROL joint committee, a collection of local authorities responsible for enforcing PCNs who make use of the traffic penalty tribunals adjudication process.

Decisions of the Traffic Penalty Tribunal can be challenged by judicial review. The appeal process is governed by the Civil Enforcement of Parking Contraventions (England) Representations and Appeals Regulations 2007 and The Civil Enforcement of Parking Contraventions (England) General Regulations 2007.

The tribunal handles roughly 25000 cases per year, the vast majority of appeals are handled virtually

== Other ==
=== Horserace Betting Levy Appeal Tribunal ===
The Horserace Betting Levy Appeal Tribunal hear appeals against the amount of levy collected by the Horserace Betting Levy Board to be used in the improvement of horseracing and breeds of horses, and for the advancement of veterinary science and education.

=== Information Commissioner ===
The Information Commissioner considers complaints that organisations may have breached data protection laws, or that public authorities have not complied with the law on freedom of information. It also considers complaints made under the Privacy and Electronic Communications Regulations 2003.

=== Investigatory Powers Tribunal ===
The Investigatory Powers Tribunal hears complaints about surveillance carried out by a public body under the Regulation of Investigatory Powers Act, including any alleged conduct by or on behalf of the Security Service (MI5), the Secret Intelligence Service (MI6) and the Government Communications Headquarters (GCHQ).

=== Proscribed Organisations Appeal Commission ===
The Proscribed Organisations Appeal Commission deals with appeals in cases where the Home Secretary has decided not to de-proscribe organisations (remove their status as illegal organisations) believed to be involved in terrorism. The Commission is an independent tribunal that was established under the Terrorism Act 2000.

=== Scottish Charities Appeal Panel ===
The Scottish Charities Appeal Panel hears appeals against decisions of the Office of the Scottish Charity Regulator.

=== Solicitors Disciplinary Tribunal ===
The Solicitors Disciplinary Tribunal adjudicates upon alleged breaches, by solicitors, of rules or their code of professional conduct. Cases are prosecuted by the Solicitors Regulation Authority.

== Tribunals which have never sat ==
=== Antarctic Act Tribunal ===
The Antarctic Act Tribunal would consider any appeal against the Secretary of State in cases where permits for a British expedition to enter or remain in Antarctica, granted under the Antarctic Act 1994, have been revoked or suspended.

=== Chemical Weapons Licensing Appeal Tribunal ===
The Chemical Weapons Licensing Appeal Tribunal would consider any appeal against the Secretary of State where a licence to produce, use or have possession of toxic chemicals or precursors under the Chemicals Weapons Act 1996 has been refused, revoked or varied.

=== Conveyancing appeal tribunals ===
Conveyancing appeal tribunals would have heard appeals against decisions of the Authorised Conveyancing Practitioners Board, set up to regulate the conveyancing industry. However the board was never formally established, and the tribunal has therefore never sat.

=== Industrial Arbitration Tribunal ===
The Industrial Arbitration Tribunal decides disputes arising from vesting and compensation orders which the Secretary of State has the power under the Industry Act 1975 to issue in regard to the transfer of control of important manufacturing undertakings to non-residents. These powers have never been exercised.

=== Justices and Clerks Indeminification Tribunal ===
The Justices and Clerks Indeminification Tribunal would hear appeals by magistrates and clerks from decisions of magistrates' courts committees regarding indemnification against costs incurred in disputing any claims made against them.

=== Mines and Quarries Tribunal ===
The Mines and Quarries Tribunal would enquire into the competence of a person to continue to hold a certificate in regard to the performance of duties relating to mines and quarries. The tribunal has never been convened.

=== Sea Fish Licence Tribunal ===
The Sea Fish Licence Tribunal would have heard appeals from individual fishermen against their "days at sea" allocations in their licence, under the Sea Fish (Conservation) Act 1967. However the "days at sea" programme envisaged by the Act was never commenced and the tribunal has never been convened.

== Former tribunals ==
A number of tribunals have been abolished since the system's establishment.

=== Insolvency Practitioners Tribunal ===
The Insolvency Practitioners Tribunal heard referrals in respect of the refusal to grant, or the intention to withdraw, a license to act as an insolvency practitioner. It was abolished by Deregulation Act 2015.

=== Aircraft and Shipbuilding Industries Arbitration Tribunal ===
The Aircraft and Shipbuilding Industries Arbitration Tribunal was established to hear appeals over the valuation of shares to compensate individual operators following the nationalisation of the UK aerospace and shipbuilding industries in the late 1970s. It was abolished in March 2013.

=== Residential Property Tribunals Service ===
The Residential Property Tribunals Service was a collective of domestic property-related tribunals. It was made up of the:

- Leasehold valuation tribunal
- Rent assessment committee
- Residential property tribunal

It was abolished under the Transfer of Tribunal Functions Order 2013 and its functions were transferred to the Property Chamber of the First-tier Tribunal with effect from 1 July 2013.

==== Rent assessment committees and rent tribunals ====
Rent assessment committees and rent tribunals determines disputes about fair and market rents, for examples objections to rents assessed by the Rent Service, establishing an open market rent figure or deciding new rental terms after the end of an assured tenancy or assured shorthold tenancy.

==== Residential property tribunals ====
Residential property tribunals deal with appeals against the refusal by a local housing authority or housing association to allow a tenant to buy their home on the grounds that the property is particularly suitable for occupation by elderly persons, applications for and appeals against empty dwelling management orders, and appeals against various other types of housing orders and notices.

==== Leasehold valuation tribunals ====
Leasehold valuation tribunals decide disputes relating to residential leasehold property, for example the price to be paid when renewing a lease, the tenant's right of first refusal when the landlord sells the property and service charges.
