= Tax court =

Tax courts are courts of limited jurisdiction that deal with tax issues.

Notable examples include:

- United States Tax Court, a United States federal court
  - List of Judges of the United States Tax Court
  - Uniformity and jurisdiction in U.S. federal court tax decisions
- State and local courts (United States):
  - Oregon Tax Court of the Oregon Judicial Department
  - Hawaii Tax Appeal Court of the Hawai'i State Judiciary
  - Indiana Tax Court
  - Massachusetts Appellate Tax Board
  - Minnesota Tax Court
  - New Jersey Tax Court
  - New York City Tax Appeals Tribunal
- Tax Court of Canada
  - Tax Court of Canada Act
- Provincial courts (Canada):
  - Assessment Review Board which hears appeals on issues regarding property assessment, classifications, and taxes in Ontario
  - Regional Assessment Appeal Court of Nova Scotia
- United Kingdom
  - The tax chamber of the First-tier Tribunal
  - The tax chamber of the First-tier Tribunal for Scotland
  - The tax and chancery chamber of the Upper Tribunal which hears appeals from the tax chamber of the First-Tier Tribunal
  - The tax chamber of the Upper Tribunal for Scotland which hears appeals from the tax chamber of the First-tier Tribunal for Scotland.
  - Valuation Tribunal for England which considers appeals of local council decisions on council tax, business rates and other related matters in England.
  - Valuation Tribunal for Wales which considers appeals of local council decisions and decisions by the Valuation Office Agency on council tax and non-domestic rates.
  - Council Tax Reduction Review Panel in Scotland.
- EFTA Court
- Philippine Court of Tax Appeals
- Fiscal Court (Germany)
- Federal Fiscal Court in Austria, see de:Bundesfinanzgericht
- Tax justice courts (Italy)
