= Franks Report =

Two inquiries in the United Kingdom resulted in a Franks Report, both conducted by Sir Oliver Franks:

- Franks Report (1957), on administrative tribunals and inquiries
- Franks Report (1983), into the causes of the Falklands War
