= Stephen Woolman, Lord Woolman =

Scottish legal academic (born 1953)

The Right Honourable Lord Woolman
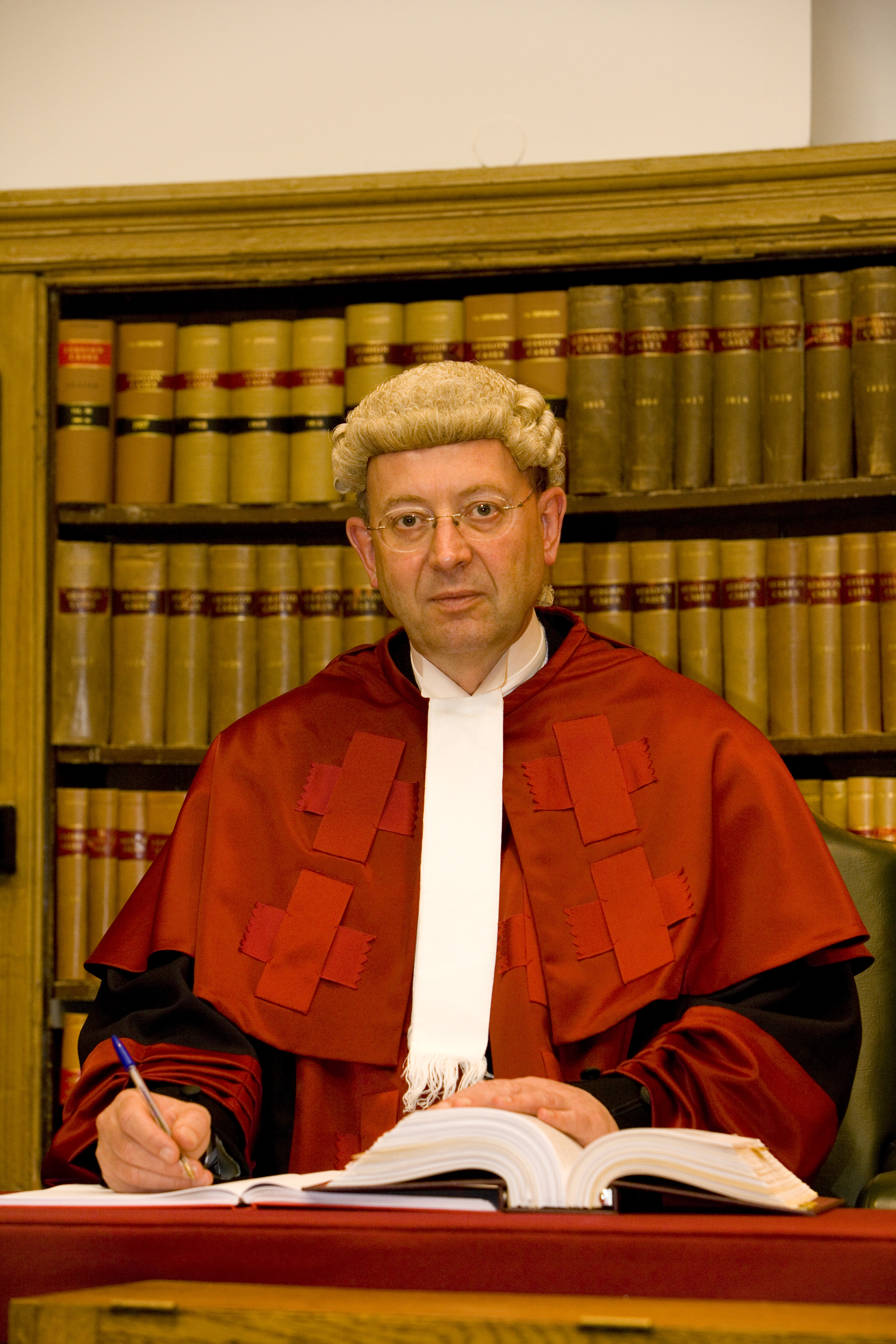
- Official portrait in 2008

Senator of the College of Justice
- In office March 2008 – May 2023
- Nominated by: Alex Salmond; As First Minister
- Appointed by: Elizabeth II
- Preceded by: Lord Philip

President of the Scottish Tribunals
- In office August 2020 – 30 April 2023
- Appointed by: Lord Carloway; As Lord President
- Preceded by: Lady Smith

Personal details
- Born: Stephen Errol Woolman; 16 May 1953 (age 73)
- Education: University of Aberdeen
- Profession: Advocate

Stephen Errol Woolman, Lord Woolman, PC (born 16 May 1953) is a Scottish legal academic and a retired Senator of the College of Justice.

== Early life ==
Woolman was educated at George Heriot's School, Edinburgh and studied law at the University of Aberdeen. He was a lecturer in the Faculty of Law of the University of Edinburgh from 1978 to 1987, serving as Associate Dean from 1981 to 1984. He published the first edition of his work on Contract in 1987, being admitted to the Faculty of Advocates the same year.

== Legal career ==
Woolman served as Standing Junior Counsel to the Office of Fair Trading (1991 to 1995), the Procurement Executive of the Ministry of Defence (1991 to 1995), and the Inland Revenue (1996 to 1998). He was appointed a Queen's Counsel in 1998 and served as Advocate Depute from 1999 to 2002. He was keeper of the Advocates' Library and a trustee of the National Library of Scotland from 2004 to 2008, and chairman of the Scottish Council of Law Reporting from 2007 to 2008.

He was appointed Senator of the College of Justice, a judge of the High Court of Justiciary and Court of Session, the Supreme Courts of Scotland, in 2008, as Lord Woolman. He sat in the Inner House of the Court of Session. He also served as President of the Scottish Tribunals, replaced by Lady Wise. He was formerly deputy chairman of the Boundary Commission for Scotland (2009 – 2015).

He holds an honorary LLD from the University of Aberdeen and was elected as a fellow of the Royal Society of Edinburgh in 2022. He retired in May 2023.

=== Publications ===
- Woolman on Contract, 1987 (6th ed. 2018) W. Green & Sons. (ISBN 978 0 414 01647 7)

== Personal life ==
Lord Woolman married Helen Mackinnon in 1977, with whom he has two daughters.

== See also ==
- List of Senators of the College of Justice
