= Tenancy deposit schemes (Scotland) =

The Tenancy Deposit Schemes (Scotland) Regulations 2011 (SSI 2011/176) is a piece of Scottish Statutory Legislation passed by the Scottish Parliament that regulates how tenancy deposits are handled in the private rented sector. Exercising powers granted under the Housing (Scotland) Act 2006, the regulations came into statutory force on 7 March 2011, with physical protection services commencing operations on 2 July 2012. Under the legislation, any private landlord or letting agent who requests or receives a monetary deposit must register with their local authority and transfer the funds to a government-backed third-party administrator.

The regulations cap total tenant deposits at the equivalent of two months' rent and restrict landlords from demanding hidden start-of-tenancy fees. Deposits must be formally protected in a custodial scheme within 30 working days of the lease beginning, alongside the mandatory provision of prescribed information to the tenant. Landlords are legally required to use one of three authorized independent providers:

- Letting Protection Service Scotland
- MyDeposits Scotland
- SafeDeposits Scotland

Disagreements regarding deductions at move-out are adjudicated by a free, independent Alternative Dispute Resolution (ADR) system. Non-compliance with the regulations falls under the jurisdiction of the First-tier Tribunal for Scotland (Housing and Property Chamber), which holds the statutory authority to order landlords to pay mandatory financial awards up to three times the original deposit value.

== Background and Reasons for Introduction ==
Prior to the implementation of the regulations, private landlords held tenant deposits directly, leaving tenants with limited, costly options—such as small claims court—if a landlord withheld money without justification. The framework was introduced into Scots law to safeguard funds against "unscrupulous" or insolvent landlords, and to balance a landlord's security with a tenant's right to a fair refund.

At the time of inception, the Scottish Housing Minister, Keith Brown, estimated that up to 11,000 tenants in Scotland had their deposits wrongly or unfairly retained each year, totaling millions of pounds in unprotected cash. By transferring custody to an independent body, the regulations ensured access to a free alternative dispute resolution (ADR) mechanism to adjudicate disagreements over property damage, unpaid rent, or cleaning costs at checkout.

== Landlord Duties and Requirements ==
The regulations establish strict administrative timelines and transparency duties for landlords:

=== Deposit Lodgement and Deadlines ===
Landlords must pay any received deposit over to an approved scheme administrator within 30 working days of the tenancy's start date.

=== Prescribed Information ===
Within that same 30-working-day window, the landlord is legally mandated to provide the tenant with specific "prescribed information" under Regulation 42. This must include confirmation of the deposit amount, the date received, the date lodged with the scheme, the property address, the landlord's local authority registration status, and the terms under which deductions might be made.

== Alternative Dispute Resolution (ADR) ==
When a tenancy ends, either the landlord or the tenant can initiate the deposit repayment process through their designated scheme administrator. If both parties agree on how the funds should be allocated, the scheme must release the undisputed money within five working days. However, if a disagreement arises regarding deductions—such as for property damage, cleaning bills, redecoration, or rent arrears—the schemes provide a free, independent Alternative Dispute Resolution (ADR) service.

The ADR framework functions through an evidence-based adjudication method rather than active mediation or arbitration; the parties are never required to meet, and the adjudicator does not conduct property site visits. The process strictly follows defined operational steps:

- Self-Resolution Phase: Before formal adjudication is triggered, the schemes require a preliminary negotiation cycle (typically 5 to 10 working days) to allow the parties to settle the breakdown directly.
- Evidence Submission: If self-resolution fails, the case shifts to formal ADR. The landlord must first submit robust evidence justifying the deductions (such as check-in/check-out inventory reports, date-stamped photographs, and professional receipts). The tenant is then granted a matching window to review the claim and submit counter-evidence.
- Adjudication and Fair Wear and Tear: An independent adjudicator assesses the documentation and issues a binding decision. Under Scots law, adjudicators must strictly account for "fair wear and tear," meaning landlords cannot charge tenants for natural deterioration caused by ordinary, reasonable use of the property over time. Once a decision is finalised, the scheme distributes the funds accordingly.

== Exemptions ==
While tenancy deposit protection regulations apply broadly across Scotland's private rental sector, several housing agreements and scenarios are legally exempt from requiring third-party deposit scheme protection:

- Resident Landlords: Owner-occupiers sharing their main residence with a tenant or lodger are exempt.
- Immediate Short-Term Returns: Deposits returned in full to the tenant within 30 working days of the tenancy start date do not trigger scheme protection rules.
- Holiday Lets: Short-term vacation rentals and holiday homes fall outside standard private landlord frameworks.
- Family Arrangements: Tenancies granted to direct family members (such as parents, children, or siblings, but excluding cousins) are exempt.
- Agricultural and Crofting Tenancies: Properties governed by dedicated agricultural or crofting statutes are excluded.
- Supported Accommodation and Care Facilities: Healthcare, social care, and specialized supported housing arrangements are exempt.
- Religious Organisations: Properties owned and let directly by registered religious groups for operational or personnel use are excluded.
- Properties Under Control Orders: Properties subject to municipal emergency management or state control orders are exempt.

Additionally, property types or landlord classes exempt from local authority landlord registration under the Antisocial Behaviour etc. (Scotland) Act 2004 are likewise exempt from deposit protection rules.

== First-tier Tribunal Case Law and Sanctions ==
If a landlord fails to safeguard the deposit or fails to provide the prescribed information within the 30-working-day deadline, tenants have legal recourse to seek financial penalties. Initially, compliance cases were raised through the local Sheriff Court. However, following structural reforms to the private rented sector under the Housing (Scotland) Act 2014, jurisdiction was transferred on 1 December 2017 to the First-tier Tribunal for Scotland (Housing and Property Chamber). Applications to the Tribunal must be submitted no later than three months after the tenancy has officially ended. Under Regulation 10, if a breach is proven, the Tribunal has no discretion regarding whether to penalise the landlord; a financial order must be issued. However, the exact scale of the penalty—up to a maximum of three times the deposit value—is heavily determined by judicial discretion based on evolving case law. Guided by binding Upper Tribunal precedents, such as Rollett v Mackie UT 45 and Ahmed v Russell UT 7, the Tribunal reviews the specific facts of each case to determine a "fair, proportionate, and just" sanction:

- Maximum Sanctions (3x Deposit): The full three-times penalty is typically reserved for cases involving systemic non-compliance, bad faith, intentional deception, or where the landlord's failure actively obstructed the tenant's access to the free ADR process. For instance, in cases where a landlord registers a deposit but deliberately fails to transfer the physical funds to the scheme administrator, leaving the tenant unprotected, severe penalties are enforced.
- Mitigated Sanctions (Lower Multiples): If a landlord late-protects a deposit due to a genuine administrative oversight, corrects the error voluntarily during the tenancy, and shows no history of non-compliance, the Tribunal routinely mitigates the penalty to a fraction of the deposit value (e.g., 1x or 1.5x).

The Tribunal holds that structural ignorance of the law or relying blindly on a letting agent does not absolve a private landlord of their legal responsibilities under the 2011 Regulations.

== History and Cross-Border Comparison ==
The introduction of tenancy deposit protections varied significantly between the legal jurisdictions of the United Kingdom. While the Parliament of the United Kingdom mandated statutory protections across England and Wales under the Housing Act 2004 (commencing 6 April 2007), the Scottish Government delayed national enforcement until 2012 to tailor the framework to specific elements of Scots law and local market metrics. Structurally, the systems in Scotland differ fundamentally from England and Wales across administrative timelines, financial caps, and available protection models:

Feature	Scotland Framework	England and Wales Framework
Approved Scheme Operators	Letting Protection Service (LPS) Scotland, MyDeposits Scotland, and SafeDeposits Scotland.	Deposit Protection Service (DPS), MyDeposits, and Tenancy Deposit Scheme (TDS).
Permitted Protection Models	Custodial Only. All physical cash must be transferred directly to the scheme administrator.	Custodial and Insurance-Backed. Landlords can pay a fee to hold the deposit in their own bank accounts if backed by commercial insurance.
Statutory Submission Window	Within 30 working days from the physical start date of the tenancy.	Within 30 calendar days from the exact date the landlord receives the funds.
Maximum Deposit Caps	Historically capped at the equivalent of 2 months' rent under the Rent (Scotland) Act 1984.	Capped by the Tenant Fees Act 2019 at 5 weeks' rent (annual rent under £50k) or 6 weeks' rent (annual rent £50k+).
End-of-Tenancy Distribution	Undisputed funds must be released by the scheme operator within 5 working days.	Undisputed funds must be released by the scheme operator within 10 calendar days.
Primary Enforcement Forum	First-tier Tribunal for Scotland (Housing and Property Chamber).	County Courts of England and Wales.

=== Corporate Origins of the Scottish Schemes ===
The three providers operating under the 2011 regulations represent a blend of commercial enterprise, non-profit trusts, and cross-border expansion:

- Letting Protection Service Scotland (LPS): Launched as a direct business unit of Computershare Investor Services PLC, a multinational financial administration firm. Computershare utilized infrastructure developed running the custodial Deposit Protection Service (DPS) in England and Wales to establish a matching, free-to-use custodial pipeline in Scotland.
- MyDeposits Scotland: Formed through a joint venture between the National Residential Landlords Association (NRLA) and commercial insurance providers, expanding their pre-existing deposit protection presence in England and Wales into the Scottish rental landscape.
- SafeDeposits Scotland: Established in Glasgow in 2012, it is the only scheme physically based in Scotland and holds the largest market share (approximately 69%). It operates on a not-for-profit model; all financial surpluses generated from deposit pool interest are donated to the SafeDeposits Scotland Charitable Trust to fund education and training across the Scottish private rental sector. It is a corporate affiliate of The Dispute Service (TDS), which operates equivalent schemes across England, Wales, and Northern Ireland.

== See also ==
- Private housing (Tenancies) (Scotland) Act 2016 – Legislation that introduced the modern Scottish Private Residential Tenancy (PRT).
- Housing (Scotland) Act 2025 – Subsequent legislation introducing enhanced rent control zones, eviction protections, and updated private tenancy regulations.
- First-tier Tribunal for Scotland – The judicial body responsible for resolving housing and property disputes in Scotland.
- Scots property law – The broader legal framework governing land and property rights within the Scottish legal system.
