= Farhy v. Commissioner =

- Court: United States Court of Appeals for the D.C. Circuit
- Full case name: Alon Farhy, Appellee, v. Commissioner of Internal Revenue, Appellant.
- Decided: May 3, 2024

Holding
- The fixed-dollar penalty under IRC § 6038(b)(1) may be assessed by the Commissioner of Internal Revenue.

Laws applied
- Internal Revenue Code § 6038

Farhy v. Commissioner of Internal Revenue, 100 F.4th 223 (D.C. Cir. 2024) was a case in the United States Court of Appeals for the D.C. Circuit in which the Court held that the fixed-dollar penalty under IRC § 6038(b)(1) is assessable by the Commissioner of Internal Revenue.

== Background ==
Section 6038(b)(1) of the Internal Revenue Code provides that any person who fails to timely furnish information where required for a foreign business entity as laid out in § 6038(a) "shall pay a penalty of $10,000 for each annual accounting period with respect to which such failure exists."

The United States Tax Court held in Farhy that the commissioner lacked statutory authority to administratively assess and collect the fixed-dollar penalty under § 6038(b), with the government instead being able to collect the penalties via a civil action under 28 U.S.C. § 2461(a).

The D.C. Circuit, on appeal by the commissioner, reversed the Tax Court's decision, finding that the penalties were assessable. Under Golsen v. Commissioner, the D.C. Circuit's ruling controls in Tax Court for cases that would appeal to the D.C. Circuit, with the Tax Court's previous decision in Farhy controlling for cases in other circuits.

== Aftermath ==
The Court of Appeals for the Second Circuit agreed with the D.C. Circuit in the subsequent case Safdieh v. Commissioner. The Tax Court had previously ruled in favor of Safdieh on summary judgment, applying its earlier holding in Farhy.

In applying its Golsen doctrine, the Tax Court must also apply the Second Circuit's holding on § 6038(b)(1) penalty assessability for cases appealable to the Second Circuit.
