= Upper Tribunal for Scotland =

General appeal tribunal in Scotland

- Royal coat of arms of the United Kingdom as used in Scotland
- Established: 2014
- Jurisdiction: Scotland
- Location: Multiple
- Authorised by: Courts Reform (Scotland) Act 2014
- Appeals to: Court of Session
- Website: www.scotcourts.gov.uk

President of the Scottish Tribunals
- Currently: Lady Wise
- Since: 5 April 2023

The Upper Tribunal for Scotland (UTfS) is a general appeal tribunal and superior court of record in Scotland.

It was created by the Tribunals (Scotland) Act 2014, which aimed to create a simplified structure for tribunals in Scotland.

The Lord President of the Court of Session, as head of the judiciary in Scotland, is responsible for the Upper Tribunal for Scotland. Some of the Lord President's functions in relation to tribunals have been delegated to the President of the Scottish Tribunals, currently Lady Wise.

It is administered by the Scottish Courts and Tribunals Service.

== Jurisdiction ==
The Upper Tribunal for Scotland hears appeals from the First-tier Tribunal for Scotland. Upper Tribunal appeals are binding nationwide on all First-tier Tribunal for Scotland cases.

Unlike the First-tier Tribunal for Scotland, the Upper Tribunal for Scotland is not divided into chambers. However, it does use different rules of procedure for social security appeals.

=== Relationship with the UK-wide Upper Tribunal ===
The UK-wide Upper Tribunal exercises many similar functions to the Upper Tribunal for Scotland, although the two are entirely separate.

== People ==
=== Representation ===
The Tribunal does not require legal representation, though a party may instruct a Solicitor, Advocate, or layperson to represent them if they wish.

=== Judiciary and tribunal members ===
The Tribunal has three types of member:

- Judicial - appointed judges from the Scottish judiciary, normally sheriffs
- Legal - qualified Advocates or Solicitors
- Ordinary - laypeople

The composition of the Tribunal will depend on from which First-tier Chamber it is hearing an appeal from. For instance:

- Housing and Property Chamber appeals can be heard by a single sheriff
- Tax chamber appeals can be heard by a single legal member

It may share members with the First-tier Tribunal for Scotland.

== Appeals ==
Decisions of the Upper Tribunal can be appealed on points of law only, and go to the Inner House of the Court of Session.

This gives the Upper Tribunal status approximately equivalent to the Sheriff Appeal Court or the Outer House.
