= United States federal judge =

Judges on courts authorized by Article III of the U.S. Constitution

In the United States, a federal judge is a judge who serves on a court established under Article Three of the U.S. Constitution. Often called "Article III judges", federal judges include the chief justice and associate justices of the U.S. Supreme Court, circuit judges of the U.S. courts of appeals, district judges of the U.S. district courts, and judges of the U.S. Court of International Trade.

Federal judges are not elected officials, unlike the president, vice president, U.S. senators, and U.S. representatives. They are nominated by the president and confirmed by the Senate. The Constitution gives federal judges life tenure, and they hold their seats until they die, resign, or are removed from office through impeachment.

Although they are sometimes called "federal judges", the term technically does not extend to U.S. magistrate judges or the judges of lesser federal tribunals such as the U.S. Bankruptcy Courts, the U.S. Court of Federal Claims, the U.S. Court of Appeals for the Armed Forces, the U.S. Court of Appeals for Veterans Claims, the U.S. Tax Court, and other "Article One tribunals". These judges do not have life tenure, and their authority derives from Congress via Article One of the Constitution, not independently via Article Three. These judges are often known as "Article I judges". The term is also not applied to the administrative law judges of federal government agencies located within the executive branch.

== Appointments ==
According to the Appointments Clause of Article II of the U.S. Constitution, all federal judges, including the judges of the Supreme Court and inferior federal courts created by the Congress, shall be nominated by the president and confirmed by the Senate. The Constitution does not provide any eligibility criteria – such as age, literacy, citizenship, legal education, legal/bar or any professional certification, and legal/judicial experience – for one to be appointed as a federal judge.

== Powers and duties ==
The primary function of the federal judges is to resolve matters brought before the United States federal courts. All federal courts in the United States are courts of limited jurisdiction, meaning that they hear only cases for which jurisdiction is authorized by the United States constitution or federal statutes.

Federal district courts are authorized to hear a wide range of civil and criminal cases. District court judges are recognized as having a certain degree of inherent authority to manage the matters before them, ranging from setting the dates for trials and hearings to holding parties in contempt or otherwise sanctioning them for improper behavior. In other circumstances their actions are dictated by federal law, the federal rules of procedure, or "local" rules created by the specific court system itself.

== Allocation of cases ==
The chief judge of each district court is responsible for overseeing assignments of judges to cases, following a written policy. For reasons of impartiality, this is typically done by a random drawing or rotation. Judges may also be assigned particular types of cases based on their technical expertise or assigned to cases in a specific geographic location.

Appeals courts and the Supreme Court use similar systems, but depending on the type of filing, may assign one, three, all, or some other number of judges to deal with a particular request. For example, emergency motions might require a response from only one judge assigned to be on duty for a particular time period, but final decisions in important cases require the whole court. Appeals courts range in size from 6 (First Circuit) to 29 (Ninth Circuit). Some judges have specific expertise by virtue of which court they sit on.

By statute, the United States Court of Appeals for the Federal Circuit has exclusive appellate jurisdiction for patents, trademarks, and certain employee benefits. Because it geographically covers the headquarters of federal agencies, the judges of the United States Court of Appeals for the District of Columbia Circuit gain special expertise in administrative and constitutional law.

== Tenure ==
Section 1 of Article III of the U.S. Constitution provides that federal judges "shall hold their Offices during good Behaviour". This clause has long been interpreted to give federal judges life tenure. Federal judges hold their seats until they resign, die, or are removed from office by impeachment. Although the legal orthodoxy is that judges cannot be removed from office except by Congressional impeachment, several legal scholars, including William Rehnquist, Saikrishna Prakash, and Steven D. Smith, have argued that the Good Behavior Clause may, in theory, permit removal by way of a writ of scire facias filed before a federal court, without resort to impeachment. Deaths of United States federal judges in active service may also have profound political and procedural effects, as such circumstances present substantially less opportunity for preparation for an orderly succession.

== Salary ==
As of 2024, federal judges' annual salaries are $246,300 for district judges, $257,900 for circuit judges, $298,500 for associate Supreme Court justices, and $312,200 for the chief justice of the United States. Chief Justice John Roberts has repeatedly pleaded for an increase in judicial pay, calling the situation "a constitutional crisis that threatens to undermine the strength and independence of the federal judiciary". For some partners at leading law firms, especially in major metropolitan areas, becoming a federal judge can represent a more than 90 percent pay cut. Associates at the largest U.S. law firms with judicial clerkship experience already earn as much as a federal judge in their first year as full-time associates.

When those attorneys eventually become experienced partners and reach the stage in life where one would normally consider switching to public service, their interest in joining the judiciary is tempered by the prospect of a significant pay cut. One way for attorneys to soften the financial blow is to spend only a few years on the bench and then return to private practice or go into private arbitration, but such turnover creates a risk of a revolving door judiciary subject to regulatory capture. Roberts has warned that "judges are no longer drawn primarily from among the best lawyers in the practicing bar" and "If judicial appointment ceases to be the capstone of a distinguished career and instead becomes a stepping stone to a lucrative position in private practice, the Framers' goal of a truly independent judiciary will be placed in serious jeopardy."

== Duty station ==
Each federal judge serves at a particular "duty station" for the duration of their federal service. This is important because of the relationship among several federal statutes. First, 28 U.S.C. § 456(a) entitles federal judges to reimbursement of transportation and "subsistence" expenses incurred while transacting official business away from their duty stations. Section 456 also prescribes that the District of Columbia is the duty station of all members of the U.S. Supreme Court, the D.C. Circuit, the Federal Circuit, and the U.S. District Court for the District of Columbia.

Second, there are several reasons federal judges need to transact official business outside of their regular courthouse. 28 U.S.C. §§ 291 and 292 authorize a broad variety of temporary reassignments of circuit and district judges, both horizontally (i.e., to other circuits or districts) and vertically, so that a district judge can hear appeals and a circuit judge can try cases.

Many federal judges serve on administrative panels like the judicial council for their circuit or the Judicial Conference of the United States. Some of the larger circuit courts like the Ninth Circuit hold regular sessions at multiple locations, and randomly select three-judge panels to hear appeals from all sitting circuit judges regardless of duty station. Videoconferencing is sometimes now used to reduce the burden of frequent travel on circuit judges.

== Discipline ==
The discipline process of federal judges is initiated by the filing of a complaint by any person alleging that a judge has engaged in conduct "prejudicial to the effective and expeditious administration of the business of the courts, or alleging that such judge is unable to discharge all the duties of the office by reason of mental or physical disability." If the chief judge of the circuit does not dismiss the complaint or conclude the proceedings, then they must promptly appoint himself or herself, along with equal numbers of circuit judges and district judges, to a special committee to investigate the facts and allegations in the complaint. The committee must conduct such investigation as it finds necessary and then expeditiously file a comprehensive written report of its investigation with the judicial council of the circuit involved. Upon receipt of such a report, the judicial council of the circuit involved may conduct any additional investigation it deems necessary, and it may dismiss the complaint.

If a judge who is the subject of a complaint holds their office during good behavior, action taken by the judicial council may include certifying disability of the judge. The judicial council may also, in its discretion, refer any complaint under 28 U.S.C. § 351, along with the record of any associated proceedings and its recommendations for appropriate action, to the Judicial Conference of the United States. The Judicial Conference may exercise its authority under the judicial discipline provisions as a conference, or through a standing committee appointed by the chief justice.

== Retirement ==
Judges who meet their age and service requirements may retire and will then earn their final salary for the remainder of their life, plus cost-of-living increases. The "Rule of 80" is the commonly used shorthand for the age and service requirement for a judge to retire, or assume senior status, as set forth in Title 28 of the U.S. Code, section 371(c). Beginning at age 65, judges may retire at their current salary, or take senior status, after performing 15 years of active service as an Article III judge (65 + 15 = 80). A sliding scale of increasing age and decreasing service (66 + 14, 67 + 13, 68 + 12, 69 + 11) results in eligibility for retirement compensation at age 70 with a minimum of 10 years of service (70 + 10 = 80).

Under section 376 a survivor's annuity to benefit the widow, widower or minor child of the judge may be purchased via a deduction of 2.2% to 3.5% from the retirement benefit.

== Number of judges ==
As of 2024, there were 870 authorized Article III judgeships: nine on the Supreme Court, 179 on the courts of appeals, 673 on the district courts, and nine on the Court of International Trade.

Although the number of Supreme Court justices has remained the same for well over a century, the number of court of appeals judges has more than doubled since 1950, and the number of district court judges has increased more than three-fold in that period.

The total number of federal judges at any given time is not necessarily the same as the number of judgeships because of vacancies and because justices and judges who meet age and service requirements may retire from active service but retain their office, which creates a vacancy in their judgeship. In addition, some district court judges serve on more than one court at a time.

== Non-Article III judges ==
Unlike the judges of Article III courts, non-Article III judges are appointed for specified terms of office. Examples include United States magistrate judges and judges of the United States bankruptcy courts, United States Tax Court, United States Court of Federal Claims, and United States territorial courts. Although the term "non-Article III judges" is used to describe the absence of tenure and salary protection, bankruptcy courts are formally designated as divisions of U.S. District Courts, whose district judges are Article III judicial officers. Moreover, in Freytag v. Commissioner, 501 U.S. 868 (1991), the Supreme Court concluded that the judges of the U.S. Tax Court (and their special trial judges) exercise a portion of "the judicial power of the United States."

== See also ==
- Judicial appointment history for United States federal courts
- List of United States federal judges by longevity of service
- List of current United States circuit judges
- List of current United States district judges
- Federal judiciary of the United States
- Article Three of the United States Constitution
- PACER (Public Access to Court Electronic Records)
- CM/ECF (Case Management/Electronic Case Files)
- List of courts of the United States (outline of all state and federal courts in the United States)
- Federal Rules of Civil Procedure
- Uniformity and jurisdiction in U.S. federal court tax decisions
- List of presidents of the United States by judicial appointments
