= Wyn Williams =

Welsh judge (born 1951)

Sir Wyn Williams FLSW
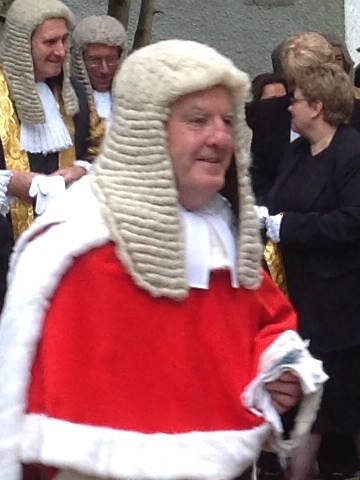
- Williams in 2013

President of Welsh Tribunals
- In office December 2017 – March 2023
- Preceded by: Position established
- Succeeded by: Sir Gary Hickinbottom

Justice of the High Court
- In office 11 January 2007 – 10 February 2017

Personal details
- Born: Wyn Lewis Williams; 31 March 1951 (age 75) Ferndale, Wales
- Education: Corpus Christi College, Oxford

Sir Wyn Lewis Williams FLSW (born 31 March 1951) is a Welsh judge who served as President of Welsh Tribunals from 2017 to 2023. He had been a High Court judge from 2007 to 2017.

== Early life and education ==
Wyn Lewis Williams was born in Ferndale in the Rhondda to Ronald and Nellie Williams. Educated at Rhondda County Grammar school he matriculated at Corpus Christi College, Oxford, before entering the Inns of Court School of Law in London.

== Legal career ==
Williams was called to the bar (Inner Temple) in 1974 and made a bencher in 2007. He practised in Cardiff from 1974 to 1988 and in London from 1988 to 2004. He became a Queen's Counsel in 1992, and served as a recorder until his appointment as a specialist Chancery judge for Wales in 2004. On 11 January 2007, Williams was appointed a High Court judge, receiving the customary knighthood, and assigned to the Queen’s Bench Division. He served as a presiding judge for the Wales Circuit and as Deputy Chairman of the Boundary Commission for Wales.

He was appointed president of Welsh tribunals in December 2017, and retired from the post on 31 March 2023.

In February 2022 he began the statutory inquiry into the British Post Office scandal, projected to continue into the middle of 2024.

== Other activities ==
He is active in several organisations, being president of Pendyrus Male Choir, and is closely associated with Tylorstown RFC, the rugby union club for which he played as a youth. His connection with rugby was furthered in 2012 when he was appointed as an unpaid independent chairman of the Professional Regional Game Board, an organisation set up by the Welsh Rugby Union to restructure the sport in Wales.

He is an elected Fellow of the Learned Society of Wales (FLSW).

Legal offices
New title	President of Welsh Tribunals; 2017–2023	Succeeded by Sir Gary Hickinbottom
