= First-tier Tribunal for Scotland =

First-instance general tribunal in Scotland

- Royal coat of arms of the United Kingdom as used in Scotland
- Established: 2014
- Jurisdiction: Scotland
- Location: Multiple
- Authorised by: Courts Reform (Scotland) Act 2014
- Appeals to: Upper Tribunal for Scotland
- Website: www.scotcourts.gov.uk

President of the Scottish Tribunals
- Currently: Lady Wise
- Since: 5 April 2023

The First-tier Tribunal for Scotland (FtTfS) is a first-instance general tribunal in Scotland.

It was created by the Tribunals (Scotland) Act 2014, which aimed to create a simplified structure for tribunals in Scotland, amalgamating the functions of several tribunals into one.

The Lord President of the Court of Session, as head of the judiciary in Scotland, is responsible for the First-Tier Tribunal for Scotland. Some of the Lord President's functions in relation to tribunals have been delegated to the President of the Scottish Tribunals, currently Lady Wise.

It is administered by the Scottish Courts and Tribunals Service.

== Chambers and Jurisdiction ==
The First-tier Tribunal for Scotland currently (as of 2023) consists of six chambers, each with a Chamber President:

Chamber	Chamber president	Function	Inherited from	References
General Regulatory Chamber	Alexander Green	Hearing appeals against decisions of the Office of the Scottish Charity Regulator.	Scottish Charity Appeals Panel	
General Regulatory Chamber	Alexander Green	Hearing appeals against the issuing of parking Penalty Charge Notices.	Parking and Bus Lane Appeal Tribunal for Scotland	
General Regulatory Chamber	Alexander Green	Hearing appeals against the issuing of unlawful bus lane use Penalty Charge Notices.	Aberdeen City Council, Edinburgh City Council and Glasgow City Council.	
Health and Education Chamber	May Dunsmuir	Disputes concerning pupils with additional support needs.	Additional Support Needs Tribunals for Scotland	
Housing and Property Chamber	Aileen Devanny	Hearing appeals by the landlord or tenant against the determination of a Rent Officer, applications for rent determinations by tenants holding statutory Assured or Short Assured tenancies, and applications for a determination of terms by a landlord or tenant within the first year of the creation of a statutory assured tenancy.	Private Rented Housing Panel	
Housing and Property Chamber	Aileen Devanny	Determining applications from homeowners in relation to disputes between them and their property factor in relation to the property factors’ statutory duties and compliance with the Property Factors' Code of Conduct.	Homeowner Housing Panel	
Housing and Property Chamber	Aileen Devanny	Civil cases relating to the private rented sector.	Sheriff court	
Social Security Chamber	Andrew Veitch (temporary)	Hearing appeals in relation to social security benefits which are awarded by Social Security Scotland.	N/A	
Tax Chamber	Anne Scott	Hearing appeals in relation to the devolved Scottish taxes administered by Revenue Scotland.	N/A	
Local Taxation Chamber	Jacqui Taylor (temporary)	Appeals in relation to council tax and non-domestic rates.	Local authorities	

=== Future planned jurisdiction ===
As of 2023, is planned that the Health and Education chamber will inherit the jurisdictions of the NHS National Appeal Panel for Entry to the Pharmaceutical Lists and the NHS Tribunal for Scotland in the future.

=== Relation with the UK-wide First-tier Tribunal ===
The UK-wide First-tier Tribunal exercises many similar functions to the First-tier Tribunal for Scotland, although the two are entirely separate.

Decisions made by UK Government bodies are only by heard by the UK-wide FTT, for instance benefits awarded by the Department for Work and Pensions, whilst decisions made by Scottish Government bodies are only heard by the FtTfS.

== Appeal ==
Decisions of the various chambers of the First-tier Tribunal for Scotland may be appealed to the Upper Tribunal for Scotland. An appeal may only be made with the permission of the FtTfS or the UTfS.
