= Federal judiciary of the United States =

Third constitutional branch of government

The federal judiciary of the United States is one of the three branches of the U.S. federal government organized under the U.S. Constitution and laws of the federal government. The U.S. federal judiciary does not include any state court (which includes local courts), which are completely independent from the federal government. The U.S. federal judiciary consists primarily of the U.S. Supreme Court, the U.S. courts of appeals, and the U.S. district courts. It also includes a variety of other lesser federal tribunals.

Article III of the Constitution requires the establishment of a Supreme Court and permits the Congress to create other federal courts and place limitations on their jurisdiction. Article II, Section 2 states that federal judges are appointed by the president with the consent of the Senate. Article III provides that judges serve until they resign, are impeached and convicted, or die.

== Courts ==
All federal courts can be readily identified by the words "United States" (abbreviated to "U.S.") in their official names; no state court may include this designation as part of its name. The federal courts are generally divided between trial courts, which hear cases in the first instance, and appellate courts, which review contested decisions made by lower courts.

=== U.S. Supreme Court ===
The Supreme Court of the United States is the court of last resort. It generally hears appeals from the courts of appeals (and sometimes state courts), operating under discretionary review, which means that the Supreme Court can choose which cases to hear, by granting petitions for writs of certiorari. There is therefore generally no basic right of appeal that extends automatically all the way to the Supreme Court. In a few situations (like lawsuits between state governments or some cases between the federal government and a state) it sits as a court of original jurisdiction.

Less than 1% of petitions for certiorari to the Supreme Court are granted for review; the vast majority of the remaining cases are either ignored or denied, effectively making decisions from lower courts final.

=== U.S. Courts of Appeals ===
The United States courts of appeals are the intermediate federal appellate courts. They operate under a system of mandatory review which means they must hear all appeals of right from the lower courts. In some cases, Congress has diverted appellate jurisdiction to specialized courts, such as the Foreign Intelligence Surveillance Court of Review.

The U.S. Courts of Appeals are divided into 13 circuits: 12 regional circuits, numbered First through Eleventh; the District of Columbia Circuit; and a 13th circuit, the Federal Circuit, which has special jurisdiction over appeals involving specialized subjects such as patents and trademarks. Nearly all appeals are heard by three-judge panels, but all the judges in the circuit may rehear a case en banc after a three-judge panel decides the case or hear a case en banc initially on rare occasions. Decisions of the U.S. Courts of Appeals can be appealed to the Supreme Court, but the Court of Appeals is the "end of the line" for most federal cases.

Although several other federal courts bear the phrase "Court of Appeals" in their names—such as the U.S. Court of Appeals for Veterans Claims—they are not Article III courts and are not considered to sit in appellate circuits.

=== U.S. District Courts ===
The United States district courts are the general federal trial courts. There are 94 U.S. District Courts, one for each of the 94 federal judicial districts. The U.S. District Courts and federal judicial districts are organized according to U.S. state boundaries. Depending on a state's population, it may be covered by only a single district court, such as the U.S. District Court for the District of Alaska, or by up to four district courts, such as the U.S. District Courts for the Northern, Eastern, Western, and Southern Districts of New York. Most cases "are tried by a single judge, sitting alone".

In certain cases, Congress has diverted original jurisdiction to specialized courts, such as the Court of International Trade, the Foreign Intelligence Surveillance Court, the Alien Terrorist Removal Court, or to Article I or Article IV tribunals. The district courts usually have jurisdiction to hear appeals from such tribunals (unless, for example, appeals are to the Court of Appeals for the Federal Circuit).

=== Other tribunals ===
Besides these federal courts, described as Article III courts, there are other adjudicative bodies described as Article I or Article IV courts in reference to the article of the Constitution from which the court's authority stems.

There are a number of Article I courts with appellate jurisdiction over specific subject matter including the Court of Appeals for Veterans Claims and the Court of Appeals for the Armed Forces, as well as Article I courts with appellate jurisdiction over specific geographic areas such as the District of Columbia Court of Appeals. The Article I courts with original jurisdiction over specific subject matter include the bankruptcy courts (for each district court), the Court of Federal Claims, and the Tax Court.

Article IV courts include the High Court of American Samoa and territorial courts such as the District Court for the Northern Mariana Islands, District Court of Guam, and District Court of the Virgin Islands. The United States District Court for the District of Puerto Rico was transformed from an Article IV court to an Article III court in 1966, and reform advocates say the other territorial courts should be changed as well.

== Judges ==
Federal judges, like Supreme Court justices, are appointed by the president with the consent of the Senate to serve until they resign, are impeached and convicted, retire, or die.

Under Article I of the federal Constitution, Congress also has the power to establish other tribunals, which are usually quite specialized, within the executive branch to assist the president in the execution of their powers. Judges who staff them normally serve terms of fixed duration, as do magistrate judges. Judges in Article I tribunals attached to executive branch agencies are referred to as administrative law judges (ALJs) (including immigration judges) and are generally considered to be part of the executive branch even though they exercise quasi-judicial powers. With limited exceptions, they cannot render final judgments in cases involving life, liberty, and private property rights, but may make preliminary rulings subject to review by an Article III judge.

== Administration ==
- The Judicial Conference of the United States is the policymaking body of the U.S. federal courts. The conference is responsible for creating and revising federal procedural rules pursuant to the Rules Enabling Act.
- The Administrative Office of the United States Courts is the primary support agency for the U.S. federal courts. It is directly responsible to the Judicial Conference. The AO prepares the judiciary's budget, provides and operates secure court facilities, and provides the clerical and administrative staff essential to the efficient operation of the courts.
- The judicial councils are panels within each circuit charged with making "necessary and appropriate orders for the effective and expeditious administration of justice".
- The Federal Judicial Center is the primary research and education agency for the U.S. federal courts.
- The Judicial Panel on Multidistrict Litigation transfers and consolidates cases in multiple judicial districts that share common factual issues.
- The United States Marshals Service is an Executive Branch agency that is responsible for providing protection for the federal judiciary and transporting federal prisoners.
- Federal Public Defender agencies provide indigent defense services to clients charged in with federal offenses.
- The Supreme Court Police provide security for the Supreme Court building.

=== Accountability ===
The 30,000 people who work for the judiciary have unusually low workplace protections. Victims of workplace harassment at the judiciary and their advocates have called for more transparency and accountability, proposing an independent body overseeing working conditions within the judicial system. This extends to the incomplete disclosure of gifts, including luxury trips, for judges throughout the judiciary, which hampers the ability of the public to know whether there are enough conflicts of interest to warrant a recusal.

Suja A. Thomas argues the federal judiciary has taken most of the constitutionally defined power from juries in the United States for itself thanks in part to the influence of legal elites and companies that prefer judges over juries as well as the inability of the jury to defend its power.

Americans have a historic distrust of the courts, according to David Daley, the author of Ratf**ked. Based on a 2024 Gallup poll, only 35 percent of Americans have faith in the courts.

== Legal procedure ==
The Supreme Court has interpreted the Constitution as placing some additional restrictions on the federal courts. For example, the doctrines of mootness, ripeness, and standing prohibit district courts from issuing advisory opinions. Other doctrines, such as the abstention doctrine and the Rooker–Feldman doctrine limit the power of lower federal courts to disturb rulings made by state courts. The Erie doctrine requires federal courts to apply substantive state law to claims arising from state law (which may be heard in federal courts under supplemental or diversity jurisdiction). In difficult cases, the federal courts must either guess as to how a court of that state would decide the issue or, if that state accepts certified questions from federal courts when state law is unclear or uncertain, ask an appellate court of that state to decide the issue.

Notably, the only federal court that can issue proclamations of federal law that bind state courts is the Supreme Court itself. Decisions of the lower federal courts, whether on issues of federal law or state law (when the question was not certified to a state court), are persuasive but not binding authority in the states in which those federal courts sit.

Some commentators assert that another limitation upon federal courts is executive nonacquiescence in judicial decisions, where the executive simply refuses to accept them as binding precedent. In the context of administration of U.S. internal revenue laws by the Internal Revenue Service, nonacquiescences (published in a series of documents called Actions on Decisions) "generally do not affect the application of stare decisis or the rule of precedent". The IRS "will recognize these principles and generally concede issues accordingly during administrative proceedings". In rare cases, however, the IRS may continue to litigate a legal issue in a given circuit even where the IRS has already lost a case on that issue in that circuit.

== History ==
The Articles of Confederation provided a clear basis for the initial establishment of United States of America judicial authority by Congress prior to the Constitution. This authority, enumerated by Article IX, allowed for the establishment of United States jurisdiction in the trial of piracies and felonies committed on the high seas, final appeals from state court decisions in all cases of captures of enemy ships, last resort for resolution of disputes between two or more states (including disputes over borders and jurisdiction), and final determination of controversies between private parties arising from conflicting land grants issued by two or more states prior to settlement of which state actually has jurisdiction over the territory. The Court of Appeals in Cases of Capture was the first United States court established by the United States. Additional United States courts were established to adjudicate border disputes between the states of Connecticut and Pennsylvania, New York and Massachusetts, Georgia and South Carolina. A United States court was also established for the Northwest Territory.

When the Constitution came into force in 1789, Congress gained the authority to establish the federal judicial system as a whole. Only the Supreme Court was established by the Constitution itself. The Judiciary Act of 1789 created the first inferior (i.e., lower) federal courts established pursuant to the Constitution and provided for the first Article III judges.

Virtually all U.S. law schools offer an elective course that focuses specifically on the powers and limitations of U.S. federal courts, with coverage of topics such as justiciability, abstention doctrines, the abrogation doctrine, and habeas corpus.

== See also ==
- Uniformity and jurisdiction in U.S. federal court tax decisions
