= Barbara Franks =

English voluntary worker

- Born: Barbara Mary Tanner; 1907
- Died: 1987 (aged 79–80)
- Education: Philosophy, politics and economics joining Lady Margaret Hall
- Known for: Voluntary worker
- Spouse: Oliver Franks, Baron Franks
- Children: 2

Barbara Mary Franks, Lady Franks (née Tanner; 1907 – 1987) was an English voluntary worker. She was a Quaker and took on voluntary roles including being a magistrate for twenty years. She was the wife of the British Ambassador to the United States after the second world war.

== Life ==
She was born in 1907 to Agatha Mary (née Gales) and Herbert George Tanner (1882–1974). They lived at Llanfoist in Clifton Down in Bristol. Her father was in business and her was a magistrate. Her mother came from a Quaker family and her parents' were an electoral agent (for the Liberals) and a peace activist. Her family were non-conformist, pacifist and Liberal and they did not smoke tobacco, drink alcohol or eat meat.

She went to a Quaker co-educational school in Somerset and soon took to public service. She went on to study a new course at Oxford University of Philosophy, politics and economics joining Lady Margaret Hall. One of her tutors was Oliver Franks and they started a lifelong partnership. She married Oliver Franks in 1931; they would have two daughters.

Her social activism led her to join the committee for Oxford Eye Hospital. She also worked as a research assistant to the historian Sir George Clark.

Her husband would learn about public service from her. Following her advice, he accepted an appointment as Professor in Glasgow, for which they left Oxford in 1937. There she helped girls in the Gorbals by helping with their Plantation Club.

She worked for the wartime Foreign ministry and volunteered with the Women's Voluntary Service. After the war she and her husband went to Washington, where he took up his post as British Ambassador. They had consulted on this appointment, which was made by the Prime Minister. She had not wanted to leave Oxford but public service was important to both of them, and they were committed to supporting each other's endeavours.

On their return to Oxford in 1952, she took on a number of voluntary roles. She chaired the bench in Oxford where she was a magistrate for over two decades. This was a role that both her father and grandfather had also undertaken. Franks was a trustee for the major charity Oxfam and she chaired Age Concern and her local Citizens' Advice Bureau. She was involved as a governor of a borstal, a detention centre, a detention centre and two prisons. She also took up painting with some success. She died in 1987. Her husband died in 1992.
