= Valuation Tribunal for Wales =

Local taxes appeal tribunal in Wales

- Tribiwnlys Prisio Cymru
- The royal badge of Wales
- Established: 2010
- Jurisdiction: Wales
- Authorised by: Local Government Finance Act 1988; Local Government Finance Act 1992
- Appeals to: Upper Tribunal (Lands Chamber); High Court of Justice
- Website: www.valuationtribunal.wales/home.html

President
- Currently: Carol Cobert

The Valuation Tribunal for Wales (VTW) (Welsh: Tribiwnlys Prisio Cymru, TPC) is a tribunal sponsored by the Welsh Government that considers appeals of local council decisions and decisions by the Valuation Office Agency on council tax and non-domestic rates.

It was established by the Welsh Ministers under powers given to them by the Local Government Finance Act 1988.

== History ==
The history of valuation tribunals is a long one, and can be traced back to the Union Assessment Committees Act 1862. It is a history closely linked to local government, with valuation tribunals for each local authority.

The current organisation was formed from a merger of four individual regional tribunals and the Valuation Tribunal Service Wales in 2010, under the Valuation Tribunal for Wales Regulations 2010.

== Proceedings ==
Tribunal proceedings can be held as a public hearing, through written representations (where everything is written), or through written submissions (where one party cannot attend). Proceedings are regulated by a range of statutory instruments such as the Council Tax (Alteration of Lists and Appeals) Regulations 1993, and the Non-Domestic Rating (Alteration of Lists and Appeals) (Wales) Regulations 2023.

It has no powers to award costs, as is the case for most UK tribunals.

=== Further appeals ===
Appeals can be made to the Lands Chamber of the Upper Tribunal. or to the High Court of Justice on points of law only.

=== Regions ===
The Tribunal's administration is divided into regions:

- North Wales
- South Wales
- West Wales
- East Wales

== Membership ==
Members of the VTW are volunteers, and receive formal training to hear appeals. They are not normally legally qualified.

Panels are normally formed of three members, although two members can hear an appeal if all parties agree. A paid clerk advises the members on points of procedure and law.

The VTW is run by the President of the Valuation Tribunal for Wales.

== Representation ==
Legal representation is not required at the VTE, but is allowed. Parties can also choose a representative (e.g. a friend or a professional adviser) to speak for them.

== See also ==
- Welsh Tribunals
- Valuation Tribunal for England
