= Tribunals in the United Kingdom =

Specialist courts in the United Kingdom

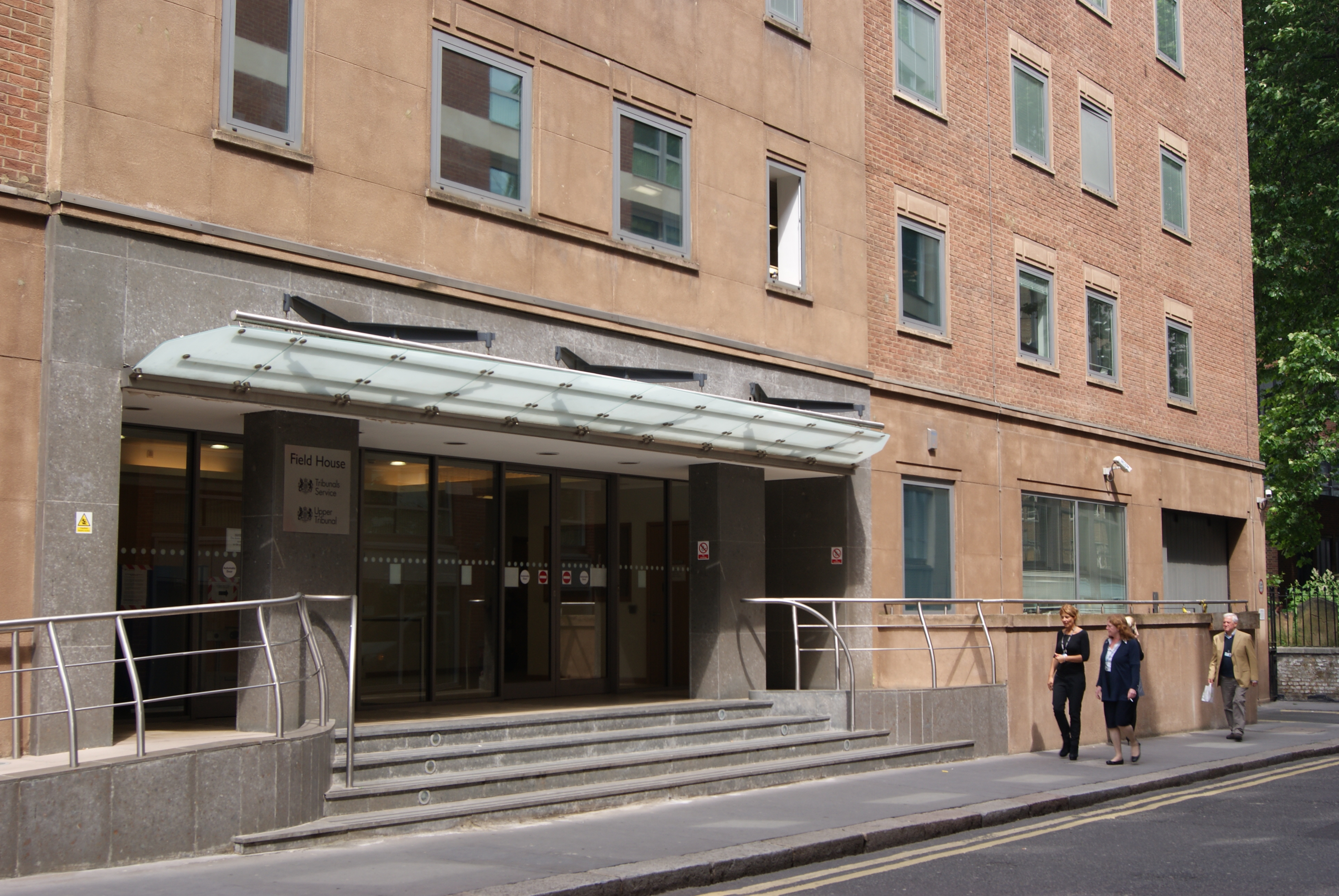
The Upper Tribunal in London

In the United Kingdom, a tribunal is a specialist court with jurisdiction over a certain area of civil law. Tribunals are generally designed to be more informal and accessible than 'traditional' courts.

They form part of the national system of administrative justice, with tribunals classed as non-departmental public bodies (NDPBs).

Examples of tribunals include employment tribunals, the Gender Recognition Panel, the Planning Inspectorate and the Company Names Tribunal.

Though it has grown up on an ad hoc basis since the beginning of the twentieth century, from 2007 reforms were put in place to build a unified system with recognised judicial authority, routes of appeal and regulatory supervision. The UK tribunal system is headed by the Senior President of Tribunals.

== History ==
The earliest extant tribunal is the General Commissioners of Income Tax created in 1799.

=== Early twentieth century (1911–1945) ===
The UK tribunal system can be seen as beginning with the coming into force of the National Insurance Act 1911 which provided for adjudication of disputes by appeal to the Insurance Commissioners, and from there to a county court. During the twentieth century, UK government ministers acquired more and more power and were vested with decisions that affected the day-to-day life of citizens.

=== Post World War II (1945–1957) ===
In 1954, the government was embarrassed by the Crichel Down affair which focused public fears about maladministration and the abuse of executive authority. The magnitude and complexity of ministerial decisions had caused many such decisions gradually to be delegated to a growing number of tribunals and in 1955, the government used the debate created by Crichel Down to order a committee under Sir Oliver Franks to report on administrative tribunals and inquiries, though not ministerial decisions of the kind that Crichel Down had exposed.

The Franks Report was published in July 1957 and its principal effect was to move tribunals from an executive and administrative model towards a judicial footing. Franks identified three principles for the operation of tribunals:

- Openness;
- Fairness; and
- Impartiality.

Take openness. If these procedures were wholly secret, the basis of confidence and acceptability would be lacking. Next take fairness. If the objector were not allowed to state his case, there would be nothing to stop oppression. Thirdly, there is impartiality. How can a citizen be satisfied unless he feels that those who decide his case come to their decisions with open minds?

=== Council on Tribunals (1958–2007) ===
The report resulted in the Tribunals and Inquiries Act 1958 (6 & 7 Eliz. 2. c. 66) which established the Council on Tribunals, which started work in 1959.

The council's principal responsibilities were to:

- Keep under review the constitution and working of the [stipulated] tribunals ... and, from time to time, to report on their constitution and working;
- Consider and report on matters referred to the Council under the Act with respect to tribunals other than the ordinary courts of law, whether or not [stipulated]; and
- Consider and report on matters referred to the Council, or matters the Council may consider to be of special importance, with respect to administrative procedures which involve or may involve the holding of a statutory inquiry by or on behalf of a Minister.

==== Scotland ====
The Scottish ministers appointed two or three council members and three or four non-members to a Scottish Committee of which the Parliamentary Ombudsman and the Scottish Public Services Ombudsman were ex officio members.

The Scottish Committee supervised certain tribunals operating in Scotland and had the right to be consulted by the council before any report about a Scottish tribunal or, in some cases, the right to report themselves to the Scottish ministers.

==== Northern Ireland ====
The Council had no authority to deal with any matter over which the Parliament of Northern Ireland had power to make laws.

=== Reform (1988–2007) ===
Tribunals had long been criticised. Lord Scarman had seen them as a danger to the prestige of the judiciary and the authority of the ordinary law. In 1988 there were calls for an Administrative Review Council to provide independent scrutiny on the Australian model but such ideas were rejected.

Though the system was little altered by the Tribunals and Inquiries Act 1992, at the start of the twenty-first century there were further calls for reform that led to the creation of the Tribunals Service in 2006, as an executive agency to manage and administer English and UK-wide tribunals. In 2011, this merged with HM Courts Service to form His Majesty's Courts and Tribunals Service.

In 2007, the Tribunals, Courts and Enforcement Act created a new unified structure for tribunals and recognises legally qualified members of tribunals as members of the judiciary of the United Kingdom who are guaranteed continued judicial independence.

==== Reform in Scotland ====
The Tribunals (Scotland) Act 2014 created a new, simplified statutory framework for tribunals in Scotland, bringing existing jurisdictions together and providing a structure for new ones. The Act created two new tribunals, the First-tier Tribunal for Scotland and the Upper Tribunal for Scotland.

The Lord President is the head of the Scottish Tribunals and has delegated various functions to the President of Scottish Tribunals, Lord Woolman.

== Structure ==
=== Two-tier system ===
The most prominent tribunal is the First-tier Tribunal, which inherited the jurisdictions of many different pre-2007 tribunals. It is divided into several "chambers", grouped around broad subject headings. It appeals to the Upper Tribunal, which is a senior court of record. From the Upper Tribunal, there is a right of appeal to the Court of Appeal of England and Wales, Court of Appeal of Northern Ireland, or Court of Session if in Scotland. Together, the First-Tier Tribunal and the Upper Tribunal may be known as the 'two-tier system'.

=== Other tribunals ===
However, many tribunals are still outside of this system – for instance employment tribunals.

=== Jurisdictions ===
There are three legal jurisdictions in the UK: England and Wales, Northern Ireland, and Scotland. Some tribunals will cover the whole of the UK, whilst others will cover only one jurisdiction. This is because there are sizable differences between procedure in, for instance, Scots civil law and English civil law.

Some courts are duplicated in different jurisdictions, eg the Employment Tribunal.

== Judiciary ==
The Tribunals, Courts and Enforcement Act 2007 created a new unified structure for tribunals and recognises legally qualified members of tribunals as members of the judiciary of the United Kingdom who are guaranteed continued judicial independence.

Most tribunal appointments are held on a fee-paid basis, but there are around 500 salaried Tribunal Judges. Most tribunal appointments are made through the Judicial Appointments Commission, and must meet the statutory qualification necessary for the particular tribunal. Their retirement age is 75.

Tribunal Judges wear normal business dress, not robes or wigs.

=== Presidents ===
Each tribunal (or chamber in the 'two-tier system') is headed by a Tribunal President. Chamber/Tribunal presidents can be selected from the ranks of existing High Court Judges (in the case of the Upper Tribunal jurisdictions) or through open competitions run by the Judicial Appointments Commission in the case of the Employment Tribunals and the Chambers of the First-tier Tribunal.

Tribunals overall are headed by the Senior President of Tribunals, appointed by the King on the recommendation of the Lord Chancellor. Lord Justice Carnwath was appointed as the first holder of the post on 12 November 2007.

The office of the President of Welsh Tribunals was created by the Wales Act 2017 and the first senior judicial role which relates solely to Wales.

=== Lay members ===
Many tribunals use lay members alongside legally-qualified judges. These may be appointed by the relevant government department (as in the Copyright Tribunal) and will generally bring specialist expertise to the panel, generally on a fee-paid basis and are paid according to the number of sittings or days worked. Tribunal Members are normally appointed for five years initially and will usually have their appointment renewed for further periods provided that they are still willing to serve and considered to be competent.

== Proceedings ==
Tribunals are designed to be more informal than 'traditional' courts of law. They use simpler formats and less strict rules of evidence.

Though often having procedures that very much resemble those of a court of law, common law and legislative rules about court proceedings do not apply directly to tribunals.

=== Legal representation ===
The majority of tribunals are designed to be accessible without legal representation. However, parties may choose to have a solicitor, barrister (or advocate in Scotland), or lay representation.

In some particularly niche tribunals, legal representation can be more common.

=== Judgments ===
Some tribunals can award costs, but not all. Tribunals have limited powers (depending on the jurisdiction of the case) to impose fines and penalties or to award compensation and costs. Other types of tribunal decisions might result in the allowance or disallowance of a benefit, leave or refusal to stay in the UK, or about the provision of special educational help for school-age children. The ordinary courts enforce tribunal decisions in cases of difficulty, and tribunals do not usually hold funds or order deposits.

=== Comparison to mediation ===
Tribunals are not the only court-like organizations that operate outside the court system. There are organisations offering Mediation and Alternative Dispute Resolution, often with specialised adjudicators and formal procedures. These approaches differ because involvement is voluntary for both parties, and rulings are often non-binding.

== See also ==
- List of tribunals in the United Kingdom
- Franks Report (1957)
- Federal tribunals in the United States

== Bibliography ==
- Bradley, A.W. & Ewing, K.D. (2003). Constitutional and Administrative Law (13th ed.). London: Longman. pp. 668–676. ISBN 0-582-43807-1.
- Department of Constitutional Affairs (2004). "Transforming Public Services: Complaints, Redress and Tribunals" (PDF).
- Franks, O. (1957) Report of the Committee on Administrative Tribunals and Enquiries, Cmnd. 218, 5s
- Jackson, R. M. & Spencer, J. R. (1989). Jackson's Machinery of Justice. London: Cambridge University Press. pp. Ch.14 "The Franks Committee". ISBN 0-521-31767-3. (Google Books)
- Leggatt, A. (2001). "Tribunals for Users - One System, One Service". Department for Constitutional Affairs.
- Marshall, G. (1957). "The Franks Report on Administrative Tribunals and Enquiries". Public Administration. 35 (4): 347–358. doi:10.1111/j.1467-9299.1957.tb01316.x.
- Scarman, L. (1975). English Law: The New Dimension (Hamlyn Lectures, 26th series). London: Stevens. ISBN 0-420-44700-8.
