= Uniformity and jurisdiction in U.S. federal court tax decisions =

Uniformity and jurisdiction in the tax decisions of the United States federal courts is the ongoing debate spanning many decades about achievement of uniformity and decisionmaking by federal courts when addressing tax controversies against the backdrop of multiple, regionally diverse courts with federal tax jurisdiction.

As a general matter, suits involving most federal laws are tried in one of the courts of regional-based federal courts of general jurisdiction - first in the 94 United States district courts, which are trial courts, with appeals made to the 14 United States courts of appeals ("circuit courts"), which are the intermediate appellate courts. Circuit court decisions are binding on the district courts within their jurisdiction, imposing some degree of uniformity. When an appeal from a decision of a court of appeals is taken to the federal high court, the Supreme Court of the United States, further uniformity is imposed, because the Supreme Court's decisions are binding on all lower federal courts.

If there are no applicable appellate decisions by the United States Supreme Court or by the court of appeals in the relevant district court jurisdiction, however, there may be a diversity of outcomes at the district court level. Similarly, there can be varying interpretations of law among the courts of appeals. Even if one or more of the decisions are appealed to the Supreme Court, a final interpretation resolving divergent viewpoints from the lower courts may not be rendered; the Supreme Court has discretionary jurisdiction, meaning it can choose which cases it wishes to hear.

Professor Steve R. Johnson, in part quoting Professor David F. Shores, characterizes the diversity as follows: "'It is difficult to imagine an adjudication system less conducive to uniform decisionmaking than the current fragmented system of federal tax trials and appeals."

== Federal court jurisdiction for tax issues ==
The debate over appellate jurisdiction on federal tax matters has been focused primarily on two issues: how best to achieve greater uniformity in federal tax decisions and whether the diversity in tax jurisdiction compromises the quality of decisions resolving tax disputes or is a strength of the system. The backdrop for this debate is the fact that four separate sets of federal courts have original jurisdiction over tax cases and appeals from original jurisdiction courts are taken to the thirteen federal courts of appeals. The four sets of courts with original jurisdiction to hear cases brought by taxpayers against the government when they disagree with a final tax deficiency notice issued by the Internal Revenue Service are:

- The United States Tax Court. The Tax Court hears about 80% of the cases brought by taxpayers disputing IRS notices of deficiency. As is typical of an Article I court, the judges are appointed for 15-year terms rather than for life; their expertise in federal tax law is an important factor in their selection, and they gain further expertise through their long tenure dealing only with tax controversies. From the taxpayer's standpoint, the advantage of bringing a dispute to the Tax Court is that payment of the deficiencies is stayed until the case is decided. While the Tax Court is headquartered in Washington, D.C., its 19 judges hear cases in about 80 cities throughout the U.S. (See also Article I and Article III tribunals). Appeals from the Tax Court are taken to whichever of the United States courts of appeals has geographical jurisdiction over the claimant.
- The United States District Courts. There are 94 U.S. district courts with broad discretion to hear cases involving federal criminal and civil law as well authority to apply state law in cases arising between citizens of different states. These Article III courts are generally considered to have great experience in factfinding through both jury and bench trials, as well as experience in the operation of state laws, the common law and constitutional law. Included within the jurisdiction of these courts is the authority to hear cases involving federal tax law. The taxpayer bringing the claim must have first paid the deficiency determined by the IRS. Appeals from the district courts are taken to whichever of the United States courts of appeals has geographical jurisdiction over that district court.
- The United States Court of Federal Claims. The U.S. Court of Federal Claims is also an Article I court with judges appointed for 15-year terms. It is centered in Washington, D.C., but can hold trials in other courts around the country. Its jurisdiction is limited to hearing claims for money that arise from the U.S. Constitution, federal statutes, executive regulations, or federal contracts. Included in this jurisdiction is the express authority to hear claims by taxpayers for refunds of federal taxes paid. As with the district courts, the taxpayer bringing the claim must have first paid the deficiency determined by the IRS. Appeals from the Court of Federal Claims are taken to the United States Court of Appeals for the Federal Circuit.
- The United States bankruptcy court. Each of the 94 federal judicial districts also has an Article I bankruptcy court which operates under the supervision of the district courts. The bankruptcy courts are broadly empowered to hear any issue arising under the Bankruptcy Code, including federal tax issues arising in bankruptcy proceedings. Professor Johnson reports a growing trend for important questions of substantive tax liability to be decided in bankruptcy proceedings, and since the overwhelming majority of bankruptcy proceedings are voluntary, there is a significant element of taxpayer choice in bringing the tax issues to the bankruptcy courts. Johnson also reports that the bankruptcy courts are seen as "pro-debtor," and have procedural rules that favor litigation of tax issues. Bankruptcy Court appeals are taken to the U.S. District Court before they can be heard by the circuit courts.

== Diversity in appellate tax jurisdiction ==
For three of these sets of courts, appeals can be taken either by the taxpayer or the IRS to one of the eleven regionally-based U.S. courts of appeals or the United States Court of Appeals for the D.C. Circuit. For the Court of Federal Claims, appeals are to the Court of Appeals for the Federal Circuit, a specialized appeals court, but one with national jurisdiction. With this number of original jurisdiction courts involved in making legal determinations on federal tax matters and thirteen United States courts of appeals exercising appellate jurisdiction, observers recognize and are concerned that the tax laws can be interpreted differently for like cases. As examples, Supreme Court decisions in the well-known cases of Kowalski (whether state policemen could exclude meal reimbursements from gross income) and Dalm (whether a taxpayer could get a refund for overpaid gift taxes otherwise time-barred, when the delay was caused in resolving income tax deficiencies) show the Supreme Court resolving diametrically opposed decisions from two or more of the circuit courts. The Supreme Court, however, accepts few tax cases on appeal, and many cases are not appealed from the circuit courts, allowing diametrically opposed decisions to stand. The diversity also allows forum shopping because a taxpayer can choose to bring a case before any of three, and in a voluntary bankruptcy proceeding, four of the courts of original jurisdiction and can select the court most likely to provide a favorable opinion based on the taxpayer's knowledge of the precedents of the various courts as well as the precedents of appellate courts with jurisdiction over them.

== Addressing uniformity and diversity in tax law decisions ==
As a general matter, reviewers of the issues of decision uniformity and court diversity take the position that identical sets of facts in a tax case should result in identical court decisions. Reviewers vary on how to achieve that, however. One approach to greater uniformity was taken in the 1943 tax case of Dobson v. Commissioner when the Supreme Court effectively ruled that great deference by all other federal courts was due to Tax Court interpretations of tax law. Congress, suspicious of an "enforcement bias" on the part of the Tax Court, responded five years later with an act establishing a de novo standard of review for the circuit courts in tax cases, which had the effect of overriding the Supreme Court decision in Dobson. That left the Tax Court with a decision on whether to defer to circuit court decisions in deciding new cases, knowing that its interpretations might be accepted by some circuit courts and overturned in others. Initially, the Tax Court decided to maintain its own consistency rather than use the circuit court precedents when they differed. This approach was abandoned in 1970 in Golsen v. Commissioner when the Tax Court decided that it would follow the precedent of the court to which a case could be appealed.

== A national court of tax appeals ==
A longstanding proposal to address the issue of the lack of uniformity in court interpretations of federal tax law has been to create a national court of tax appeals. Indeed, a federal court of tax appeals appears to be the favored view of many academics who address the subject and some tax attorneys. Under the approaches advocated, tax litigation could begin in the courts of original jurisdiction, as is currently the case, but the appeals would have to be made to a single, specialized court of tax appeals which would develop great expertise on tax law as well as reconcile divergent interpretations from the lower courts so that one consistent set of interpretations would prevail. The perceived advantage of this approach is, as Professor Shores argues, "income realized by a resident of California ought to be taxed in the same way as income realized by a resident of Maine." Shores sees such consistency not only as sound policy, but as a constitutional mandate.

Despite favoring this position, the preponderant view appears to be that Congress will not support a single appellate court approach. Professor Johnson, a proponent of a national court of tax appeals, for instance, states that, "whatever its desirability, it is abundantly plain that, for the foreseeable future, creation of a national court of tax appeals is a political impracticability. The most recent serious proposal, the 1990 proposal, was a non-starter in Congress." Johnson attributes this to a view that the generalist judges in circuit courts have a perceived breadth of understanding and greater familiarity with non-tax sources such as state law and non-tax federal statutes, which may be important to the outcome of certain cases. He also notes "an undertone in much of the opposition [to a national court of tax appeals]: a suspicion that a tax appellate court would be pro-government in outlook and tendency." Professor Andre Smith, however, argues that the perception that the Tax Court has a pro-government bias is a threat to the legitimacy of the tax system. His view is that district court judges have a comparative advantage in sifting facts, and that they and the circuit courts have a substantial advantage on non-tax issues that touch on many tax controversies such as the common law, operation of state law and constitutional questions. He further argues that there is sometimes a constructive debate among the circuit courts upon which the Supreme Court relies if and when it decides to hear a case. Finally, he argues that a national court of tax appeals would exacerbate the existing perception of bias in Tax Court decisions by depriving taxpayers of the option to have their tax controversy adjudicated entirely by generalist judges seen to be impartial or even pro-taxpayer.

== The debate on uniformity and deference in tax decisions ==
With the unlikely prospects for a national court of tax appeals, a number of commentators have argued for going back to a Dobson era approach with great deference given by the circuit courts, as well as other courts of original jurisdiction to Tax Court decisions to the extent the decisions address the law rather than factual issues. Professor Shores, for instance, argues that, short of a national court of tax appeals that would provide consistent decisions about what the tax law means, substantial improvement in the level of consistency would be provided by the appellate courts adopting the Dobson approach of great deference to Tax Court decisions. While Shores takes the view that the Tax Court is more likely to correctly interpret federal tax laws than generalist courts, he appears to prize uniformity in interpretation of the tax code as the primary virtue to be sought, quoting with favor a view that "it is more important that the applicable rule of law be settled than it be settled right."

Professor Andre Smith also argues for increased deference to Tax Court decisions, but primarily for interpretations of the tax code, where he sees the Tax Court having a comparative advantage because of its expertise in tax law, but with room for the appellate courts to disagree when constitutional or other areas of law such as the common law or the operation of state law suggest a better decision. Professor Johnson, however, doesn't think that greater deference to Tax Court decisions will result in a second-best solution to the problem of uniformity compared to instituting a national court of tax appeals. His view is that a deferential approach to Tax Court decisions would lead to two sets of precedents at the appellate level: one deferential to the Tax Court within each circuit when deciding cases on appeal from the Tax Court, but a second set based on de novo review of district court decisions. He believes that this would lead to an increase in "intercircuit non-uniformity," "a whole new layer of procedural uncertainty," and "increased rewards for forum shopping, allowing taxpayers to game the system to the consistent disadvantage of the government." He also sees this as potentially eroding the number of tax law cases brought to the Tax Court, thereby further reducing the current level of uniformity. Professor Johnson's conclusion is that, "a rule requiring greater deference to Tax Court decisions – if superimposed upon the present highly fragmented and taxpayer-driven trial and appellate structure – would leave us worse off than no 'reform' at all."

== The current status of the debate ==
As indicated, Congress appears unwilling to establish a national court of tax appeals. Whether that reflects an unwillingness to provide an exception for creation of a specialized appeals court for tax matters when most other federal laws are interpreted at the circuit court level by generalist judges, a careful weighing of the pros and cons of the relative advantage of the experience of the generalist judges compared to tax specialists, or a suspicion of a "pro-government" or "pro-enforcement" bias on the part of specialized tax judges, the consensus appears to be that the institutional arrangements for tax jurisdiction are unlikely to be changed to accommodate more uniformity in tax law interpretation. Given that sentiment, it is not clear what forces would drive an initiative for the appellate courts to accord greater deference to Tax Court decisions or otherwise achieve greater uniformity in federal court tax decisions. In the meantime, there will continue to be a robust review of Tax Court and other court of original jurisdiction decisions on tax issues and a diversity of arguments and conclusions for the Supreme Court to consider when it grants certiorari to hear appeals and for Congress when it considers amending the federal tax laws.
