= Horserace Betting Levy Appeal Tribunal =

The Horserace Betting Levy Appeal Tribunal is a non-departmental public body in the Department for Culture, Media and Sport of the Government of the United Kingdom. It was established in 1963.

== History ==
In 2013, the Tribunal was reported as one of the "200 bodies" needed to be replicated in an Independent Scotland.

Reforms were announced by the second May ministry in 2017.
