= Franks Report (1983) =

British government report

The Franks Report, officially the Falkland Islands Review, was a government report produced by the Franks Committee in 1983. It reported on decisions taken by the United Kingdom government in the run-up to the 1982 invasion of the Falkland Islands by Argentina, the invasion that led to the Falklands War.

== Committee ==
On 6 July 1982, the then Prime Minister of the United Kingdom, Margaret Thatcher, announced to the British Parliament that, following consultation with the Leader of the Opposition and leaders of other Opposition parties, the Government had decided to appoint a committee of Privy Counsellors, under the chairmanship of Lord Franks, with the following terms of reference: 'To review the way in which the responsibilities of Government in relation to the Falkland Islands and their Dependencies were discharged in the period leading up to the Argentine invasion of the Falkland Islands on 2 April 1982, taking account of all such factors in previous years as are relevant; and to report'.

The Falkland Islands Review Committee, better known as the Franks Committee, consisted of six Privy Counsellors under the chairmanship of Lord Franks:

- Lord Franks, a senior civil servant and former Ambassador to Washington for the United Kingdom.
- Lord Barber, a Conservative peer and former Chancellor of the Exchequer of the United Kingdom.
- Lord Lever of Manchester, a Labour peer and former Paymaster General of the United Kingdom.
- Sir Patrick Nairne, a senior civil servant with a background in the Admiralty and UK Ministry of Defence.
- Merlyn Rees, a Labour MP and former Home Secretary of the United Kingdom.
- Lord Watkinson, a Conservative peer and former Transport Minister.

The Committee called as witnesses all the parties it considered relevant to its deliberations. These included Thatcher, the then Foreign Secretary Lord Carrington, and other members of the cabinet. It also looked at the use of intelligence information and how this was presented to the UK Government.

== Conclusions ==
The Committee's report was presented to parliament by Mrs Thatcher on 18 January 1983. Whilst critical of some of the actions of the government, the report cleared the government of any blame for the invasion. The report concluded that the Committee "would not be justified in attaching any criticism or blame to the present Government for the Argentine junta's decision to commit its act of unprovoked aggression". It argued that the invasion "could not be foreseen" but that some British Government policies "may have served to cast doubt on British commitment to the Islands and their defence". Thatcher is reported to have been anxious prior to the publication of the report and was triumphant at what she considered as vindication of her view that criticism of her government's actions were unwarranted. Simon Jenkins reported that when the report arrived "she sat down, shut her eyes and asked her secretary to read the last paragraph, the exoneration. She needed no caveats, just that sentence."

The report did criticise the way Lord Carrington had conducted negotiations and made recommendations on the gathering and use of intelligence information, including a specific recommendation on the future composition of the Joint Intelligence Committee.

== Controversy ==
The Franks Report has been mired in controversy since its publication. The British political commentator Hugo Young called it "a classic establishment job".

The controversy began as soon as the report was presented to the House of Commons. It is reported that Thatcher read the main conclusions of the report to cries of "whitewash" and ironic cheers from the opposition. In the parliamentary debate that followed its publication, the former Prime Minister James Callaghan said that "for 338 paragraphs he painted a splendid picture, delineated the light and the shade, and the glowing colours in it, and when Franks got to paragraph 339 he got fed up with the canvas he was painting, and chucked a bucket of whitewash over it". David Owen, Foreign Secretary in the previous Labour government, was kinder in his interpretation. He said in Parliament that "I do not agree with substantial parts of the Franks report, but anyone who pretends that the issue in 1982 was easy simply has not lived through such experience", and "when I read the Franks report, I think 'There but for the grace of God go I'".

Lord Franks is reported to have believed that, while there must be some criticism of government actions, as no government can be held to blame for the reckless aggression of another, there could be "no hanging conclusion". To the charge of a whitewash, he is reported as saying that it should be remembered the report was produced in the aftermath of victory and that "there is a time and place for blame", and that the report should be read carefully and to read between the lines. William Wallace of Chatham House also interpreted the Franks Report as containing two readings. According to Wallace, on first reading it "exonerated the government in office of all blame", but could also be read as a coded document much more critical of British government policy from 1977 to 1982 and less damning of the intelligence apparatus.
