= Additional Support Needs Tribunals for Scotland =

The Additional Support Needs Tribunals for Scotland (ASNTS) was a tribunal which considered appeals made against decisions of local authorities regarding the provision of educational support.

== History ==
Prior to the tribunal, cases were previously heard in the sheriff court. The tribunals were established in November 2005 by the Education (Additional Support for Learning) (Scotland) Act 2004. By 2006 the panels were ready to hear cases. The tribunals dealt with disputes concerning pupils with additional support needs. The remit of the tribunals included placing requests to special schools, transition and disability discrimination. In 2010 the Scottish Government consulted on secondary legislation that could enable the tribunal to hear disability claims cases that related to school education.

Its functions were transferred to the Health and Education Chamber of the First-tier Tribunal for Scotland in January 2018. Decisions of the ASNTS could be appealed to the Inner House of the Court of Session. The caseloads for the ASNTS had risen because of the "inadequate" provision for special-needs students in mainstream education, one academic said.
