= Franks Report (1957) =

Report by a British committee of inquiry

The Franks Report of 1957 was issued by a British committee of inquiry chaired by Sir Oliver Franks in respect of growing concerns as to the range and diversity of tribunals, uncertainty about the procedures they followed and worry over lack of cohesion and supervision. The catalyst for this was the Crichel Down Affair. However, this was a result of a decision by the British Government and the Franks committee was told to limit its discussion to formal statutory procedure and not to go into decisions of the courts or one-off decisions, which excluded the Crichel decision.

== Basic assumptions of the report ==
Tribunals are an adjudicating, rather than administrative, body and they should be fair, open and impartial. Openness is for publicity of proceedings and the reasoning behind the decision. Fairness through having a clear procedure, allowing participants to present their case fully and knowledge of requirements to meet for parties. Impartiality established from independence from the real or apparent influence of the administration.

== Aims and recommendations ==
=== Constitution of tribunals ===
Chairman to be chosen by the Lord Chancellor, normally having legal qualifications for trial and mandatory for appellate tribunals. Rest of members to be chosen by the Council of Tribunals.

=== Procedure of tribunals ===
The Council of Tribunals should direct the particular procedure in each case, with the aim of combining order with an informal atmosphere. Citizens should have a prior knowledge of the right to apply to participate and public knowledge of the proceedings unless the content is of sensitive nature, with legal representation normally allowed. Tribunals empowered to take evidence under oath, subpoena witnesses and award remedies. Decisions should give full reasons and a copy sent to all parties. Final appellate tribunal to publish its decision for lower tribunals.

=== Appeals from tribunal decisions ===
Appeal in the first instance should be to an appellate tribunal, but never to a minister unless the First Instance tribunal is highly competent. Common law remedies of Certiorari (direction to send records), mandamus (mandatory order) and writ of prohibition (abstain a court where it lacks competence) should never be restricted. Also the report recommended that a Councils of Tribunals be formed to perform their respective role as envisaged in the report.

== Achievements ==
Most of the recommendations were implemented by the Tribunals and Inquiries Act 1958 (6 & 7 Eliz. 2. c. 66) and Tribunals and Inquiries Act 1992 (c. 53); others were implemented by administrative practice.

Working and number council of tribunal was mentioned in the schedules, with their function being advisory, but they could make recommendations on any matter and had to be consulted before any rule was enacted.

Right to give reasons was added, but it had to be asked for before or during the decision, and judicial review restricted the right in a few instances. List of tribunals could be stopped by ministerial power.

The report’s recommendations were not followed where appeals to the High Court (Court of Session in Scotland) were only permitted based on law and the procedure to appoint chairman and members.
