= Tribunals (Scotland) Act 2014 =

Act of the Scottish Parliament

Tribunals (Scotland) Act 2014 (Note: Section 84.)
- Act of the Scottish Parliament
- Scottish Parliament
- Long title: An Act of the Scottish Parliament to establish the First-tier Tribunal for Scotland and the Upper Tribunal for Scotland; and for connected purposes.
- Citation: 2014 asp 10
- Territorial extent: Scotland

Dates
- Royal assent: 15 April 2014
- Commencement: various (Note: Section 83.)

Other legislation
- Amends: Judicial Pensions and Retirement Act 1993; Judiciary and Courts (Scotland) Act 2008; Scottish Civil Justice Council and Criminal Legal Assistance Act 2013
- Amended by: Revenue Scotland and Tax Powers Act 2014; Courts Reform (Scotland) Act 2014; Inquiries into Fatal Accidents and Sudden Deaths etc. (Scotland) Act 2016; Courts Reform (Scotland) Act 2014 (Consequential Provisions) Order 2016; Scottish Tribunals (Listed Tribunals) Regulations 2017; Courts Reform (Scotland) Act 2014 (Consequential and Supplemental Provisions) Order 2018; Scottish Tribunals (Listed Tribunals) Regulations 2019; Non-Domestic Rates (Scotland) Act 2020; Social Security Administration and Tribunal Membership (Scotland) Act 2020; Public Service Pensions and Judicial Offices Act 2022; Scottish Tribunals (Listed Tribunals) Regulations 2022; Scottish Tribunals (Listed Tribunals) Regulations 2024

Status: Amended

History of passage through the Parliament

Text of statute as originally enacted

Revised text of statute as amended

Text of the Tribunals (Scotland) Act 2014 as in force today (including any amendments) within the United Kingdom, from legislation.gov.uk.

The Tribunals (Scotland) Act 2014 (asp 10) is an act of the Scottish Parliament passed in October 2014 to improve access to the civil justice system and while making the Court of Session a place for the more complex cases.

== Passage ==
The bill was passed by the Scottish Parliament on 11 March 2014 and received Royal Assent on 15 April 2014.

== Provisions ==
The act established a two-tier structure for tribunals consisting of the First-tier Tribunal for Scotland and the Upper Tribunal for Scotland, replacing a number of separate tribunals. It provides for the First-tier Tribunal to be organised into a number of chambers, according to subject-matter and other relevant factors.

It also created the role of President of the Scottish Tribunals to exercise the Lord President's role in the management of tribunals.

The Edinburgh Law Review described the act as 'Align[ing] the devolved tribunals with the reserved tribunals currently operating across the UK'.
