= Gary Hickinbottom =

British judge (born 1955)

The Right Honourable Sir Gary Hickinbottom
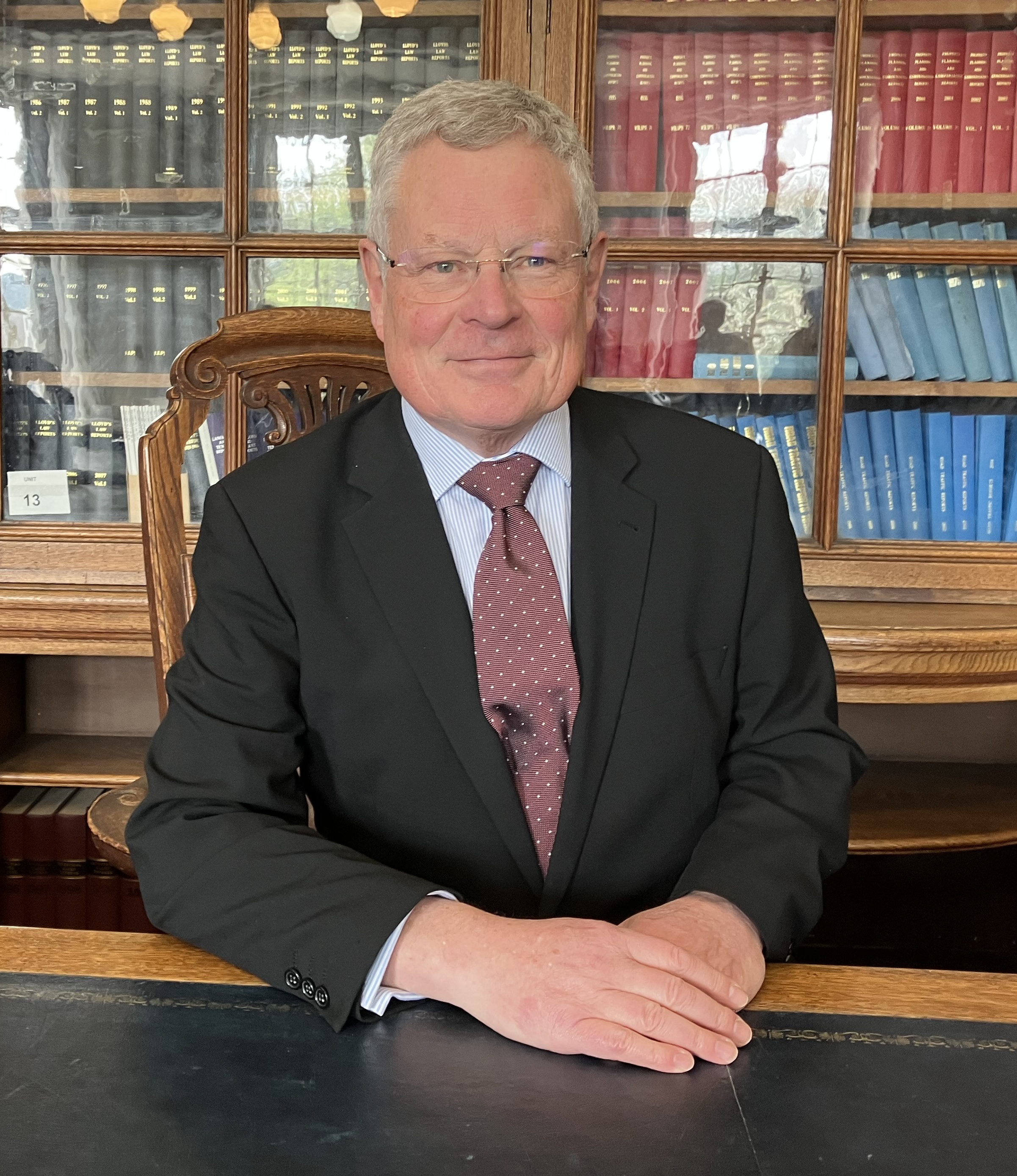

President of Welsh Tribunals
- Incumbent
- Assumed office 1 April 2023
- Monarch: Charles III

Lord Justice of Appeal
- In office 3 May 2017 – 7 January 2021
- Monarch: Elizabeth II
- Succeeded by: Sir Colin Birss

Personal details
- Born: Gary Robert Hickinbottom; 22 December 1955 (age 70)
- Occupation: Solicitor, High Court judge, Lord Justice of Appeal

Sir Gary Robert Hickinbottom PC (born 22 December 1955) is a British judge who currently serves as President of Welsh Tribunals and as Knight Principal of the Imperial Society of Knights Bachelor. In 2008, he became the fourth solicitor to be appointed a High Court judge, after Michael Sachs in 1993, Lawrence Collins in 2000, and Henry Hodge in 2004.

== Legal career ==
He was admitted as a solicitor in 1981, and later became a partner at McKenna & Co (now part of CMS Cameron McKenna). He became a recorder in 1994 and then a circuit judge in 2001. He became Chief Social Security Commissioner and Child Support Commissioner in 2003, and Chief Pension Appeal Commissioner. He has also sat as a deputy High Court judge.

=== Judicial career ===
Hickinbottom's appointment as a High Court judge was announced in September 2008, with his assignment to the King's Bench Division. He was knighted by the Queen at Buckingham Palace on 20 February 2009. In 2017, he was appointed a Lord Justice of Appeal and therefore, as is customary, was also made a member of the Privy Council, entitling him to the honorific "The Right Honourable". He retired from the Court of Appeal on 7 January 2021. He was appointed President of the Welsh Tribunals in March 2023. He represented the Imperial Society of Knights Bachelor at the 2023 Coronation.

=== Chinese restaurant controversy ===
In 2016, Hickinbottom purchased a residential property in Llandaff next door to a Chinese restaurant, the long-established Summer Palace. He and his wife, Lady (Georgina Caroline) Hickinbottom, reportedly lodged complaints about noise and smells. The Chinese restaurant received an "outpouring of support" from the public, including in the form of petitions, and was met with national political backing, in particular from the First Minister Mark Drakeford and Cardiff West MP Kevin Brennan, who together wrote a letter of support. On social media, the restaurant was supported by Welsh rugby star Jonathan Davies. Locally, other neighbours backed the restaurant, and the matter achieved some widespread coverage in the press and on the BBC. However, on 10 November 2020, Cardiff Council dropped the case against the restaurant, which remained open.

=== Notable cases ===
On 16 July 2007, sitting as a deputy High Court Judge, he upheld an application for judicial review against the decision to slaughter Shambo, a sacred black Friesian bull at the Hindu Skanda Vale Temple near Llanpumsaint in Wales which tested positive for bovine tuberculosis, holding that the Welsh government had failed to carry out the balancing exercise required by Article 9 of the European Convention for the Protection of Human Rights and Fundamental Freedoms (freedom of religion). His ruling was overturned by the Court of Appeal one week later, and the bull was slaughtered within days.

In July 2018, sitting as a Lord Justice in the Divisional Court, he upheld the conviction of Mike Buchanan, leader of the political party Justice for Men and Boys for obstructing the highway. Buchanan was arrested in June 2016 during a protest against male circumcision and convicted in October 2016. Rejecting Buchanan's appeal he said, "Buchanan had been perfectly legitimately protesting on the pavement. But he had then walked alone into the road and stood in front of cars as they tried to pass at the end of the working day. Standing there clearly put him at risk of serious injury – and he understood that risk, and was determined to take it – but it also put others at risk of injury or risked damage to property." The court also added a further £2,424 to his court bill of £3,603, bringing the total bill to £6,027.

In May 2022, he led an inquiry into the corruption of Andrew Fahie in the British Virgin Islands.

In February 2023, he chaired the board hearing Everton F.C.'s appeal against the ten-point deduction imposed by the Premier League for breaching Profit and Sustainability rules (PSR).
