= Agricultural Land Tribunal for Wales =

Welsh agricultural tribunal

- Tribiwnlys Tir Amaethyddol Cymru
- The royal badge of Wales
- Established: 1947
- Jurisdiction: Wales
- Authorised by: Agriculture Act 1947
- Appeals to: Upper Tribunal (Lands Chamber)
- Website: agriculturallandtribunal.gov.wales//

The Agricultural Land Tribunal for Wales (ALTW) (Welsh: Tribiwnlys Tir Amaethyddol Cymru) is a tribunal sponsored by the Welsh Government that deal with disputes related to agricultural holdings.

It is established under Section 73 of the Agriculture Act 1947, and also has powers under the Agricultural Holdings Act 1986 and Land Drainage Act 1991. Its functions fall under the remit of the President of Welsh Tribunals. It the oldest of the Welsh tribunals.

== Functions ==
The ALTW can hear disputes regarding:

- Agricultural processes. This includes in particular husbandry, burning of grass or heather, fixed equipment, long-term improvements, and market gardens
- Tenancy, including succession and notices to quit a holding
- Drainage, including the restoration or improvement of ditches

== Proceedings ==
The majority of hearings have been held virtually since the 2020 pandemic, although many cases do not require a hearing. Where a hearing is needed, the panel will conduct an inspection of the land involved, as well as any equipment or produce on it. Judges can be cross-deployed from the other Welsh tribunals.

Proceedings are regulated by the Agricultural Land Tribunal (Area) Order 1982 and the Agricultural Land Tribunals (Rules) Order 2007. They can be conducted in either English or Welsh.

The tribunal has no power to enforce the orders it makes, as this is held by the County Court.

=== Avenues for further appeal ===
There are two avenues for appeal of ALTW decisions:

- Review by another sitting of the ALTW
- Appeal to the Upper Tribunal

=== Representation ===
Parties can choose to be represented by a lawyer, but may also use a friend or represent themselves.

== Membership ==
The tribunal is led by a chairman, who is appointed by the Lord Chancellor and must have been a solicitor or barrister for at least 7 years' prior. The deputy chairmen must also be legally qualified. All can preside over hearings, and will write decisions.

As of 2023, the current chairman is Dr Christopher McNall. The deputy chairmen are Tanveer Rakhim and Gareth Wilson.

Other panel members do not have to be lawyers, but are still appointed by the Lord Chancellor.

The ALTW is supported by a secretariat.

== Caseload ==
From 2022 to 2023, the ALTW received:

- 19 applications related to succession of a tenancy on death
- 8 applications related to a notice to quit a tenancy
- 1 application related to land drainage

== See also ==
- President of Welsh Tribunals
