= Valuation Tribunal for England =

Local taxes appeal tribunal in England

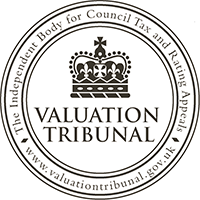
- Logo
- Established: 1992
- Jurisdiction: England
- Authorised by: Local Government Finance Act 1992
- Appeals to: High Court of Justice
- Website: valuationtribunal.gov.uk

President
- Currently: Gary Garland

The Valuation Tribunal for England (VTE) is a tribunal of the Ministry of Housing, Communities and Local Government that considers appeals of local council decisions on council tax, business rates and other related matters in England.

It was established by the Local Government Finance Act 1992. Together with the Valuation Tribunal Service (which administers it instead of HMCTS as with most courts), it is known as the Valuation Tribunal.

== Proceedings ==
Proceedings are primarily regulated by the Valuation Tribunal for England (Council Tax and Rating Appeals) (Procedure) Regulations 2017.

The VTE can consider appeals regarding:

- Council tax valuations
- Whether the appellant should be paying council tax
- Council tax reductions
- Business rates
- Some penalty notices

The VTE cannot award costs, as is the case for most UK tribunals.

=== Further appeals ===
Appeals can be made to the High Court of Justice on points of law only. Penalty notice decisions cannot be appealed.

== Membership ==
Appointments are made by the Lord Chancellor through the Judicial Appointments Commission, though a legal qualification is not a requirement of membership.

Tribunal chairs and members are not paid (although they may claim expenses).

Panels are formed of at least two members, at least one of which must be a senior member (the president, vice-president, or a chairman).

The current president, as of February 2024, is Gary Garland.

== Representation ==
Legal representation is not required at the VTE, but is allowed. Parties can also choose a representative (e.g. a friend or a professional adviser) to speak for them.

== See also ==
- Valuation Tribunal for Wales
