= Golsen v. Commissioner =

1970 U.S. federal court case

- Court: United States Tax Court
- Full case name: Golsen v. Commissioner of Internal Revenue
- Decided: April 9, 1970
- Citation: 54 T.C. 742

Case history
- Subsequent actions: Aff'd on other grounds, 445 F.2d 985 (10th Cir. 1971); Cert. denied, 404 U.S. 940 (1971)

Court membership
- Judges sitting: Arnold Raum, Withey

Case opinions
- Decision by: Raum
- Dissent: Withey

Golsen v. Commissioner of Internal Revenue, 54 T.C. 742 (1970), aff'd on other grounds, 445 F.2d 985 (10th Cir. 1971), cert. denied, 404 U.S. 940 (1971), is a case in which the United States Tax Court stated the principle that where the court of appeals to which an appeal would be made in a given case has already established a rule of precedent for a legal issue to be decided by the Tax Court, the Tax Court will follow the decision of that court of appeals. Under the rule (referred to as the Golsen rule) articulated in the case, the Tax Court may render different decisions, based on identical situations, for taxpayers that are differentiated only by the geographical area in which the Tax Court case is decided.

== Background ==
Jack E. Golsen of Oklahoma City purchased what was purportedly a whole life insurance policy from Western Security Life Insurance Co. However, the tax court found that the loan structure of the policy was effectively a term life policy and subject to a 4% tax.

== Implication ==
The Tax Court, being a national institution, hears cases that can be appealed to the courts of appeals, which lie in different judicial circuits. These courts of appeals may render different decisions for two distinct taxpayers, who have the same facts in evidence. Under Golsen, the Tax Court will, in a given case, follow the binding precedent of the Court of Appeals that would hear the appeal of that Tax Court decision in that particular case. For example, if a taxpayer resides in Texas when petitioning the Tax Court, it will apply binding precedent from the Fifth Circuit where applicable.
