= President of Welsh Tribunals =

Senior judge in Wales

President of Welsh Tribunals Llywydd Tribiwnlysoedd Cymru

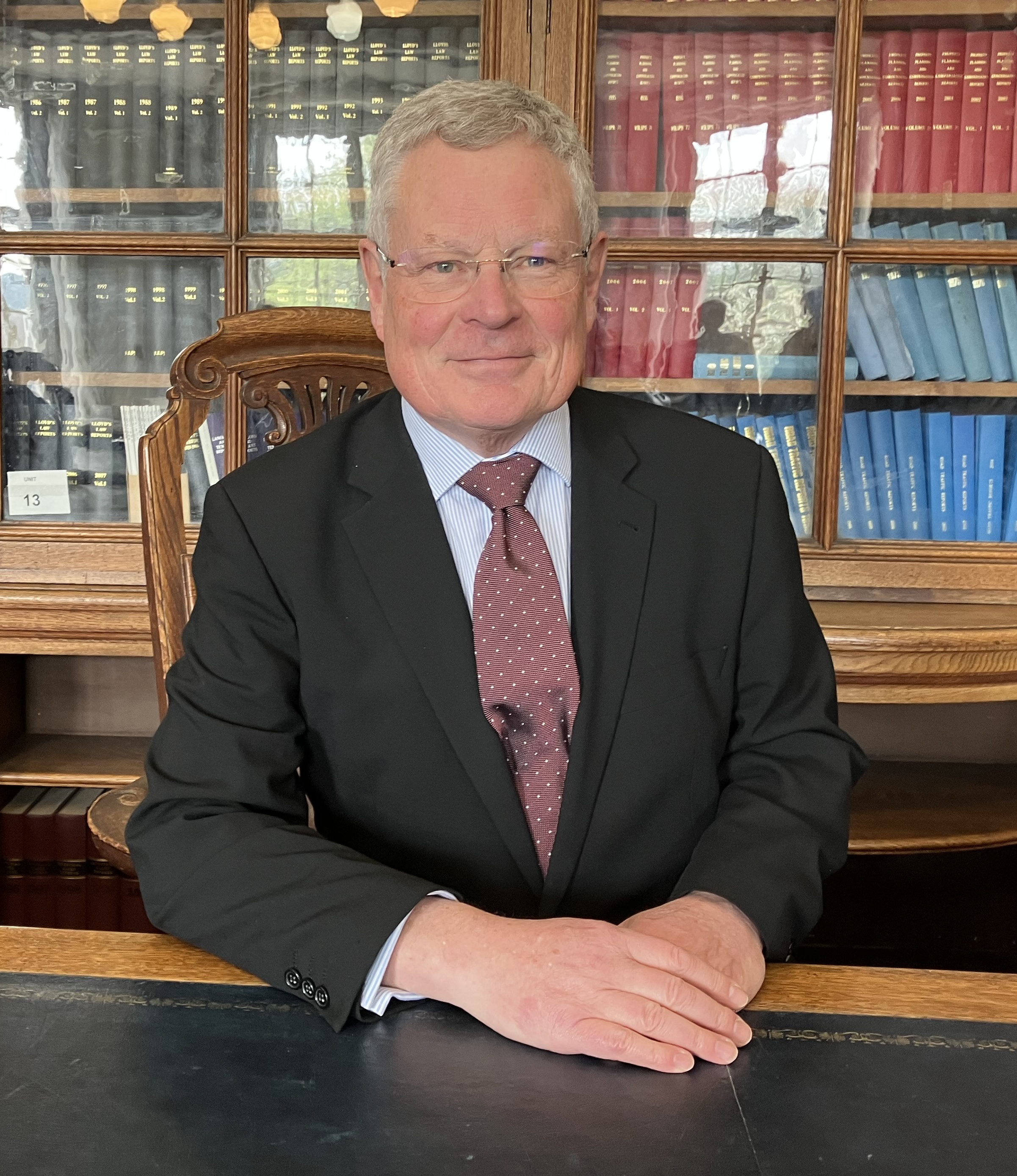
- Incumbent; Sir Gary Hickinbottom since 1 April 2023
- Nominator: Judicial Appointments Commission
- Appointer: Lord Chief Justice with consultation with the Welsh Ministers and Lord Chancellor.
- Formation: 18 December 2017

The president of Welsh Tribunals (Welsh: Llywydd Tribiwnlysoedd Cymru) is a senior judge in Wales who presides over the Welsh tribunal system. The position was established by the Wales Act 2017 and is the first senior judicial role relating solely to Wales. The president of the Welsh Tribunals is not a devolved subject matter, however the Senedd may create additional Welsh tribunals.

== Appointment and functions ==
The president of Welsh Tribunals is appointed by the lord chief justice after consultation with the Welsh ministers and lord chancellor, if no agreement is met then the recruitment may be referred to the Judicial Appointments Commission. The president of the Welsh Tribunals must satisfy the judicial-appointment eligibility condition on a seven-year basis.

The president must have regard to the need for the following:

- Welsh Tribunals to be accessible
- Proceedings before tribunals to be fair and handled quickly and efficiently
- Members of tribunals to be experts in the subject-matter of, or the law to be applied in, cases in which they decide matters—and the need to develop innovative methods of resolving disputes that are of a type that may be brought before tribunals.

The president of Welsh Tribunals can make representations to the Senedd and Welsh ministers about tribunal members and the administration of justice by tribunals.

== The Welsh Tribunals ==
The Welsh Tribunals which fall under the president's remit are:

- the Agricultural Land Tribunal for Wales
- the Mental Health Review Tribunal for Wales
- the Residential Property Tribunal for Wales
- the Special Educational Needs Tribunal for Wales
- the Welsh Language Tribunal
- a tribunal drawn from the Adjudication Panel for Wales
- a rent assessment committee constituted in accordance with Schedule 10 to the Rent Act 1977 (including a leasehold valuation tribunal and a residential property tribunal)
- a tribunal constituted in accordance with Schedule 3 to the Education Act 2005 (registration of inspectors in Wales: tribunals hearing appeals under section 27);

== List of presidents ==
- Sir Wyn Williams 18 December 2017 – 31 March 2023
- Sir Gary Hickinbottom 1 April 2023 - present

== See also ==
- Senior President of Tribunals
- President of the Supreme Court of the United Kingdom
