= Morag Wise, Lady Wise =

Scottish judge

The Right Honourable Lady Wise PC

Senator of the College of Justice
- Incumbent
- Assumed office 2013
- Nominated by: Alex Salmond; As First Minister
- Appointed by: Elizabeth II

President of the Scottish Tribunals
- Incumbent
- Assumed office 1 May 2023
- Appointed by: Lord Carloway; As Lord President
- Preceded by: Lord Woolman

Personal details
- Born: 22 January 1963 (age 63) Scotland
- Education: University of Aberdeen; McGill University
- Profession: Advocate
- Website: Judiciary of Scotland

Morag Barbara Wise, Lady Wise, PC (born 22 January 1963) is the President of the Scottish Tribunals and a Senator of the College of Justice, a judge of the Scotland's Supreme Courts. Wise is also the Chair of Governors of Fettes College.

== Early life and education ==
Wise was born on 22 January 1963 to Barbara (née Gillies) and Leslie James Wise.

She studied law at the University of Aberdeen graduating in 1985 with an LLB with first class honours, followed in 1986 with a Diploma in Legal Practice. In 1995, she received her LL.M. from McGill University, Montreal.

== Legal career ==
Wise became a solicitor in 1989 and joined Morton Fraser LLP. In 1993, she was called to the bar, joining Westwater Advocates, and specialised in family law. Wise became a Queen's Counsel in 2005, and was appointed a Temporary Judge of the Court of Session in 2008. On 6 February 2013, she was appointed a Senator of the College of Justice, taking the judicial title Lady Wise.

In 2005, Wise became a member of the Disciplinary Committee of the Faculty of Advocates She became chair of the Advocates' Family Law Association in 2007, having served as vice chair since 2000.

On 7 December 2021, it was announced that Wise had been appointed to the Inner House of the Court of Session with effect from 5 January 2022. She was sworn of Her Majesty's Privy Council on 12 April 2022 allowing her the honorific The Right Honourable.

On 5 April 2023, she was appointed President of Scottish Tribunals, succeeding Lord Woolman.

== Publications and honours ==
Wise has contributed to several editions of the legal works The Law of Scotland by Gloag and Henderson and A Practical Guide to Human Rights Law in Scotland edited by Lord Reed.

In 2015, Wise received an Honorary LLD from the University of Aberdeen.

== Personal life ==
In 1994, Wise married Alastair McEwan with whom she has two daughters and one son.
