= President of the Scottish Tribunals =

Lead judge of the Scottish Tribunals system

- Incumbent; Lady Wise since 5 April 2023
- Style: The Right Honourable
- Appointer: Lord President of the Court of Session
- Term length: Life tenure with compulsory retirement at 75
- Website: scotcourts.gov.uk

The President of the Scottish Tribunals is a senior judge in Scotland who presides over the Scottish tribunal system. They are appointed by the Lord President of the Court of Session, who delegates his function as head of the Scottish tribunals to them.

The President of Scottish Tribunals is always a senior Senator of the College of Justice, and may continue to sit in the Court of Session and High Court of Justiciary during their tenure. The current President of Scottish Tribunals is Lady Wise.

== History ==
The role was established by the Tribunals (Scotland) Act 2014.

== Officeholders ==
There have been three Presidents of Scottish Tribunals since the role's establishment:

- 2014 - Lady Smith
- 2020 - Lord Woolman
- 2023 - Lady Wise
