= Oliver Franks, Baron Franks =

English civil servant and philosopher (1905–1992)

The Right Honourable The Lord Franks OM GCMG KCB CBE PC DL
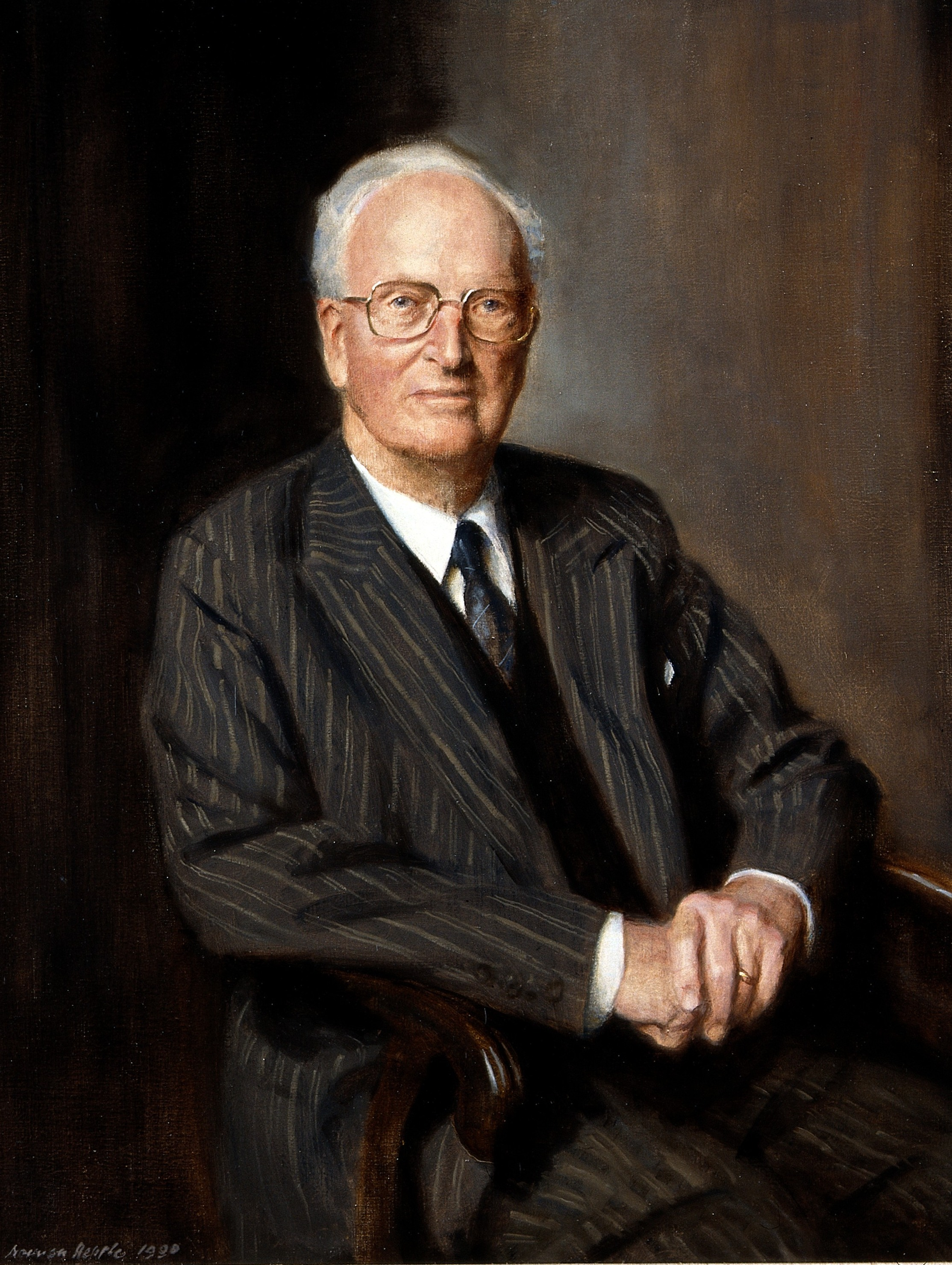
- Franks in 1990, by Norman Hepple

British Ambassador to the United States
- In office 1948–1952
- Monarchs: George VI; Elizabeth II
- Prime Minister: Clement Attlee; Winston Churchill
- Preceded by: The Lord Inverchapel
- Succeeded by: Roger Makins

Personal details
- Born: Oliver Shewell Franks; 16 February 1905 Selly Oak, Birmingham, England
- Died: 15 October 1992 (aged 87) Oxford, England
- Spouse: Barbara Franks
- Education: The Queen's College, Oxford
- Occupation: Civil servant and philosopher

Oliver Shewell Franks, Baron Franks, OM, GCMG, KCB, CBE, PC, DL (16 February 1905 – 15 October 1992), was an English civil servant and philosopher who has been described as 'one of the founders of the postwar world'.

Franks was involved in Britain's recovery after the Second World War. Knighted in 1946, he was the British Ambassador to the United States of America from 1948 to 1952, during which time he strengthened the relationship between the two countries. He was awarded a life peerage on 10 May 1962, the year in which he became Provost of Worcester College, Oxford.

Lord Franks was often called upon by the government of the day to chair important inquiries, and he is best known for his report in the aftermath of the Falklands War which ultimately exonerated the Prime Minister Margaret Thatcher and her government from charges of having failed to heed warning signals of an Argentine invasion.

== Early life ==
Franks was educated at Bristol Grammar School and Queen's College, Oxford. He became an Oxford academic, and Provost of Worcester College. He was a moral philosopher by training, serving as Professor of Moral Philosophy at the University of Glasgow between 1936 and 1946.

Oliver Shewell Franks married Barbara Tanner on 3 July 1931 at a Quaker meeting in Redland, Bristol. They had two daughters and she died in 1987.

== World War II ==
At the beginning of the war he was employed by the Ministry of Supply, where he rose to become Permanent Secretary by 1945. During the war he achieved fame by replacing the supplies after Dunkirk, and also replaced supplies from losses in the Battle of the Atlantic. After the war he became Permanent Secretary to the Ministry of Supply, and was involved in a lecture entitled Central Planning and Control in War and Peace.

== Post-war activities ==
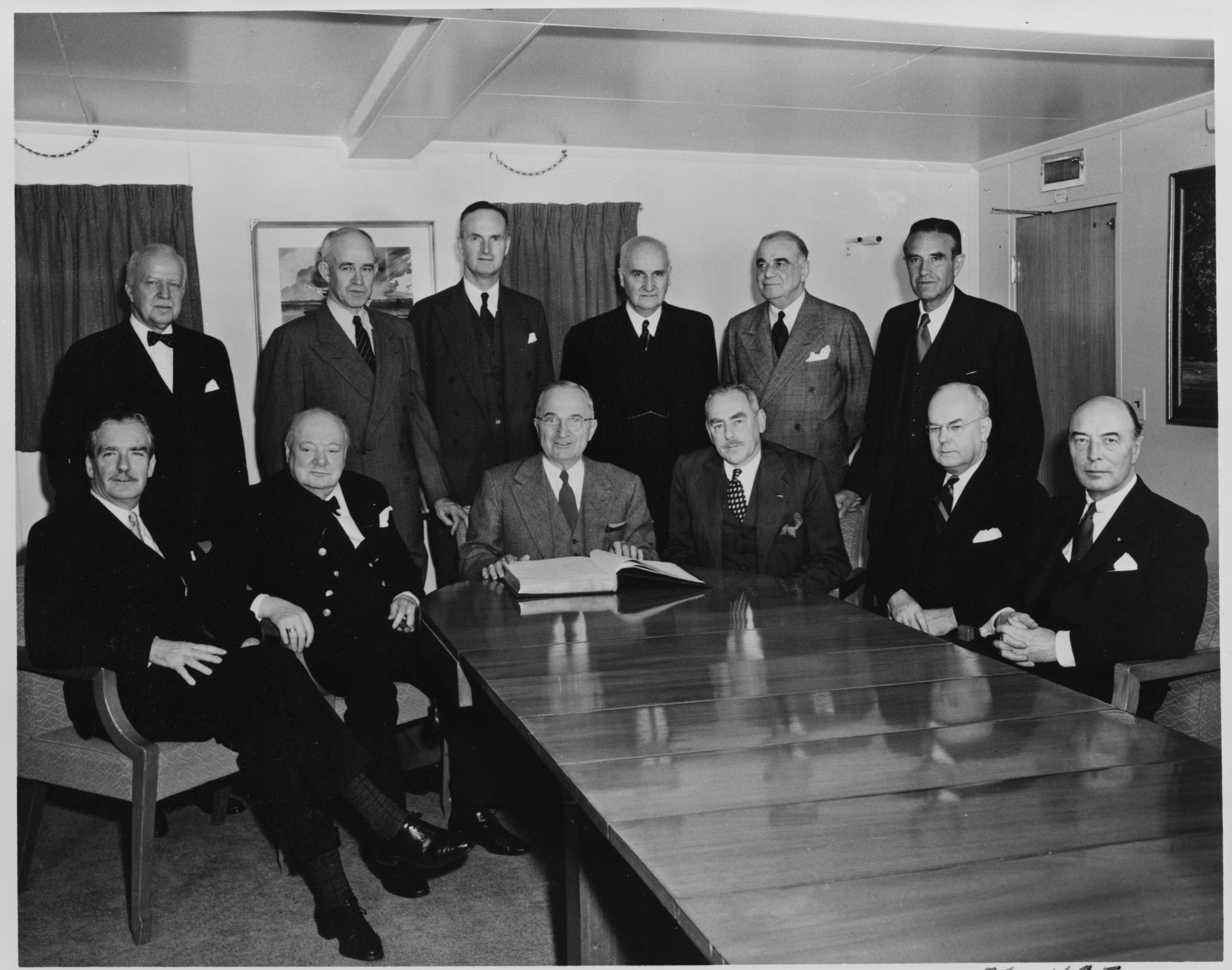
Franks (standing, 3rd from left), as ambassador to the US, at the meeting of Truman and Churchill aboard USS Williamsburg (1952)

Franks was a Liberal and a great supporter of Clement Attlee. He was admired by Ernest Bevin. He had frequent conversations with Winston Churchill and Jawaharlal Nehru. After a spell as Provost of his alma mater, Queen's College (1946–8), he was summoned by Bevin in 1947 to head the British delegation at the European discussions about George Marshall's proposals of aid. He helped found NATO (North Atlantic Treaty Organisation), and became chairman of the Organisation for European Economic Cooperation. He also had on his staff at various times Kim Philby, Guy Burgess and Donald Duart Maclean.

He was made ambassador to the United States in 1948. According to an urban legend there was one minor embarrassment early in his term. In 1948, a Washington radio station contacted ambassadors in the US capital, asking what each most wished for Christmas. The French ambassador said he would like to see peace throughout the world. The Russian ambassador wanted freedom for all people enslaved by imperialism. Sir Oliver Franks mistook the request, saying: "Well, it’s very kind of you to ask. I’d quite like a box of crystallised fruit."

When he returned to England from Washington he took up the post of Chairman of Lloyds Bank which he held only from 1954 to 1962, although he remained a director until 1975. Between 1960 and 1962 he was also chairman of Friends Provident. He was a member of the Steering Committee of the Bilderberg Group. From 1962 to 1976 he was Provost of Worcester College, Oxford.

== Later life ==
Franks presented the BBC Reith Lectures in 1954. In his series of six broadcasts, titled Britain and the Tide of World Affairs, he explored the state of postwar politics, and considered Britain's changing political relationships with the rest of the world. In 1960 he came a close second to Harold Macmillan in the election of the Chancellor of Oxford University. There were 1,697 votes for Macmillan, and 1,607 votes for Franks. He was the chairman of a Commission of Inquiry at the University of Oxford in 1964–65. Between 1965 and 1984 he was the Chancellor of the University of East Anglia.

Aged 77, in 1982 he conducted an enquiry into the events leading to the Falklands War. He was chairman of the Board of Governors, of the United Oxford Hospitals, and of the Wellcome Trust, and of the Committee on Ministerial Affairs, of the Honours Scrutiny Committee, the President Kennedy Memorial Committee, the Rhodes Trust and the Rockefeller Foundation. Franks died aged 87.

== Honours ==
Franks received the following honours and appointments:

- Companion of the Order of the Bath.
- Commander of the Order of the British Empire, 1942.
- Knight Commander of the Order of the Bath, 1946.
- Privy Counsellor, 1949.
- International Member of the American Philosophical Society, 1949.
- Knight Grand Cross of the Order of St Michael and St George, 1952.
- Life peerage, as Baron Franks, of Headington in the County of Oxford, 10 May 1962.
- Order of Merit, 1977.
- Deputy Lieutenant for Oxfordshire, 1978.

== Arms ==
Coat of arms of Oliver Franks, Baron Franks
Coronet A Coronet of a Baron Crest A fountain charged with a martlet rising Gules bezanty. Escutcheon Argent on a chevron engrailed Azure between in chief two eagles displayed and in base three martlets Gules three Bezants. Supporters Dexter a Protestant minister habited in a Geneva gown Proper clasping in the exterior hand a Bible also Proper sinister a seahorse (Hippocampus) Proper. Motto Esse Quam Videri (To Be Rather Than To Seem To Be)

== Footnotes ==
Diplomatic posts
Preceded by The Lord Inverchapel	British Ambassador to the United States; 1948–1952	Succeeded by Roger Makins
Academic offices
Preceded by Robert Howard Hodgkin	Provost of The Queen's College, Oxford; 1946–1948	Succeeded by John Walker Jones
Preceded by John Cecil Masterman	Provost of Worcester College, Oxford; 1962–1976	Succeeded by Asa Briggs
Preceded by The Viscount Mackintosh of Halifax	Chancellor of the University of East Anglia; 1965–1984	Succeeded by Owen Chadwick
