= Scottish Sentencing Council =

Advisory non-departmental public body in Scotland

Agency overview
- Formed: 19 October 2015; 10 years ago
- Type: Advisory non-departmental public body
- Jurisdiction: Scotland
- Headquarters: Parliament House, Edinburgh, EH1 1RQ
- Agency executives: Lord Beckett, Lord Justice Clerk and Chair; Ondine Tennant, Secretary to the Council
- Parent agency: Scottish Courts and Tribunals Service
- Key document: Criminal Justice and Licensing (Scotland) Act 2010
- Website: www.scottishsentencingcouncil.org.uk

Map
- Scotland in the UK and Europe

The Scottish Sentencing Council (Scottish Gaelic: Comhairle binn na h-Alba) is an advisory non-departmental public body in Scotland that produces sentencing guidelines for use in the High Court of Justiciary, sheriff courts and justice of the peace courts. Judges, sheriffs, and justices of the peace must use the guidelines to inform the sentence they pronounce against a convict, and they must give reasons for not following the guidelines.

The Scottish Sentencing Council was established by the Scottish Ministers on 19 October 2015 under powers granted by the Criminal Justice and Licensing (Scotland) Act 2010. All sentencing guidelines are submitted to the High Court of Justiciary for approval, and the High Court may approve, amend, or reject the guidelines produced by the council.

== History ==
=== Macfadyen Report ===
The establishment of the Scottish Sentencing Council was a response to the report The Scope to Improve Consistency in Sentencing, published in 2006 by Lord Macfadyen as part of the Sentencing Commission for Scotland. Lord Macfadyen identified that little research had been done into the consistency of sentencing, but that there was public perception that there is inconsistency. Lord Macfadyen defined consistency in sentencing as:

Sentencing is consistent when offenders committing similar offences are punished with similar penalties by different sentencers, whether those sentencers sit in the same court or different courts.

— Lord Macfadyen, The Scope to Improve Consistency in Sentencing

In his report Lord Macfadyen did conclude that there was evidence of inconsistency, and did not agree that there should be variation between the sentences given to broadly similar cases. As such, he recommended the creation of the Advisory Panel on Sentencing in Scotland with powers broadly similar to the current Scottish Sentencing Council.

=== Scottish Parliament ===
Lord Macfadyen's report was written following an inquiry by the Justice 1 Committee of the Scottish Parliament in 2002. In its report Public Attitudes Towards Sentencing and Alternatives to Imprisonment, the Committee found that the public had limited knowledge of the sentencing powers of the courts of Scotland, and that the public felt the courts were too lenient. However, they also found that the public were supportive of measures such as Drug and Treatment Orders, and that members of the public gave broadly similar punishments to the courts in real life. Another issue arose was the public demand for truth in sentencing, and that the public were cynical and distrustful because of automatic early release. Truth in sentencing is the belief that when a judge sentences an offender to, say, 3 years in prison that they should spend 3 years in prison.

=== Proposal for a sentencing council ===
==== Scottish Government ====
In response to Lord Macfadyen's report the Scottish Government proposed the creation of Scottish Sentencing Council, but their initial proposal was not well received by the legal profession or judiciary in Scotland. The Scottish Government's proposal was for the council's guidelines to be binding on appeals court (the High Court of Justiciary at the time), and the appeal courts only able to request to the council to revise its guidelines.

The proposed structure of the Council only had 3 judicial members (1 High Court judge, 1 Sheriff, and 1 stipendiary magistrate or justice of the peace) with 5 other members. The other 5 members were proposed to be 1 prosecutor, 1 representative of Association of Chief Police Officers in Scotland, 1 advocate, 1 solicitor and 1 representative for victims' rights.

==== Response from Faculty of Advocates ====
Both the structure and remit of the Council faced opposition from the Faculty of Advocates and the Sheriffs' Association (representing the permanent and salaried sheriffs of Scotland) who both challenged the judicial minority on the council, and the binding nature of the guidelines. The Faculty of Advocates proposed there should be at least 2 High Court judges, 1 sheriff, and 1 part-time sheriff to increase the judicial membership of the council. The Faculty also rejected the attendance of an observer from the Scottish Government.

==== Response from Sheriffs' Association ====
The Sheriffs' Association asserted that the proposals would erode judicial independence, and by unanimous decision the Council of the Association rejected the entire proposal for a sentencing council. Nonetheless, recognising that such a Sentencing Council would be created the Association asserted that it should have a judicial majority. The Sheriffs' Association asserted that the appeal courts should remain the final arbiter of any sentencing guidelines, and that judges should not be named-and-shamed for deviating from the guidelines. The Sheriffs' Association concurred with the Faculty of Advocates in rejecting an observer from the Scottish Government.

==== Response from High Court ====
The High Court of Justiciary was as emphatic in its rejection of the relationship between the proposed Sentencing Council and any appeal court finding the proposals "unsatisfactory, unworkable and unacceptable." Agreeing with both the Faculty of Advocates and Sheriffs' Association that it would erode judicial independence. The High Court concluded it would remove the Court of Criminal Appeal as the final arbiter of sentencing policy, and removing any discretion or ability to direct from the appeal courts. They asserted it remove any separation of powers between the judiciary, executive, and legislature. The response of the High Court called for 2 High Court judges, 2 sheriffs, and possibly a Sheriff Principal.

==== Response from Scottish Women's Aid ====
Scottish Women's Aid were deeply concerned about inconsistency in sentencing, highlighting that sheriffs had recognised the problem, and wanted the Sentencing Council to address this. Scottish Women's Aid asserted that there should be more than one victims' right advocate on the council, but they agreed with the High Court, Sheriffs' Association and Faculty of Advocates that the appeal courts should have the power to vary (dismiss, reduce, or increase) the sentence of convicts.

=== Judicial independence ===
==== England and Wales ====
In England and Wales the guidelines produced by the Sentencing Council are more prescriptive in nature, with the Courts of England and Wales required to follow the guidelines, as required by the Coroners and Justice Act 2009, which states:

Every court—

(a) must, in sentencing an offender, follow any sentencing guidelines which are relevant to the offender's case, and

(b) must, in exercising any other function relating to the sentencing of offenders, follow any sentencing guidelines which are relevant to the exercise of the function,

unless the court is satisfied that it would be contrary to the interests of justice to do so.

— Section 129, Coroners and Justice Act 2009

==== Royal Society of Edinburgh ====
The Royal Society of Edinburgh in considering the establishment of the Scottish Sentencing Council looked at the example of England and Wales, with the more binding nature of guidelines, and identified that many more crimes in England and Wales have sentences prescribed by statute than is the case in Scotland. It was their assertion that the original proposal, with a predominantly lay Council, and guidelines that were binding on the Appeal Court would:

...be a gross derogation from the independence of the judiciary and entirely unwarranted.

— Royal Society of Edinburgh, Sentencing Guidelines and a Scottish Sentencing Council

They went to question if such a situation would allow the Appeal Court to be regarded as independent and impartial tribunal under Article 6 of the European Convention on Human Rights. The Royal Society of Edinburgh expressed further concerns that sentencing was to be determined solely by the council, and not by either the High Court of Justiciary or the Scottish Parliament, and that the direct involvement of the Lord Advocate in sentencing would further erode judicial independence.

==== Neil Hutton ====
Professor Neil Hutton, who could go on to be appointed as a Lay Member of the council, wrote a research paper on involving the public in sentencing policy, and observed that no judiciary has sole control over sentencing. He stated that,

Sentencing always takes place within a legally authorised structure. Judges make the sentencing decision within the regulatory legal framework although in many jurisdictions, prosecutors, parole officials or others will have made decisions about a case prior to the sentencing decision of the judge.

— Professor Neil Hutton, Institutional mechanisms for incorporating the public in the development of sentencing policy.

Which addressed both public misconceptions, and assertions around judicial independence. Which highlighted in a report from the Justice Select Committee of the House of Commons in 2009, where it was recognised that Parliament, as a legislature, was responsible for defining the overall framework.

==== Scottish Government ====
The Scottish Government affirmed its commitment to judicial independence in both the Judiciary and Courts (Scotland) Act 2008 and the Courts Reform (Scotland) Act 2014, and agreed that it was important that there remain judicial discretion in sentencing, stating:

It is for the courts to decide on the most appropriate sentence, within the limits provided by Parliament, in any particular case. Each case is unique and only the court hears all the facts and circumstances surrounding the offence and the offender.

— Scottish Government, Sentencing and Criminal Penalties in Scotland

The council as established would have a judicial majority, have its guidelines subject to ratification, rejection, or amendment by the High Court of Justiciary, and the Appeal Court would be able to set aside the guidelines when determining an appeal.

=== Establishment ===
The Criminal Justice and Licensing (Scotland) Act 2010 as enacted had the Lord Justice Clerk as chair of the Council ex officio and granted a judicial majority on the council. The council was to have as judicial members a judge of the Outer House who sat in the High Court of Jusiciary, a sheriff (who was not sheriff principal), 2 summary sheriffs or justices of the peace, and a sheriff principal. The council was to have, as legally qualified members a prosecutor from the Crown Office, an advocate, and a solicitor. As lay members the council was to have a constable, a victims' rights advocate, and a further lay member.

The Scottish Sentencing Council was established by the Scottish Ministers on 19 October 2015 under powers granted by the Criminal Justice and Licensing (Scotland) Act 2010. Out-law.com reported on 23 February 2015, that the establishment of the Scottish Sentencing Council had been brought by six months, to expedite the formulation of a more consistent system of sentencing in Scotland, but also creating one that was, in the words of Scottish Government, "less prescriptive" than found in other jurisdictions.

== Remit and jurisdiction ==
=== Advisory and statutory ===
The Scottish Sentencing Council is an independent advisory non-departmental public body in Scotland, with that exists to ensure consistency in sentencing in the High Court of Justiciary, sheriff courts, and justice of the peace courts. It has been established to improve public confidence in sentencing in Scotland, and at the same time ensure judicial independence. It is chaired by the Lord Justice Clerk (the second most senior judge in Scotland), and its membership is composed of 5 members of the judiciary, 3 lawyers, and 3 lay members. It has been established to ensure consistency and transparency.

=== Approval by High Court ===
The Scottish Sentencing Council has the authority to produce guidelines for approval by the High Court of Justiciary, that will guide judges, sheriffs, and justices of the peace on the sentences they should pass on a convict in Scotland. All sentencing guidelines are submitted to the High Court of Justiciary for approval, and the High Court may approve, amend, or reject the guidelines produced by the council. Such guidelines are also subject to the authority of the Court of Criminal Appeal or Sheriff Appeal Court who retain the power to issue guideline judgments that are binding on the courts of Scotland, and require the council to review its guidelines.

=== Guideline judgments ===
Guideline judgments can be issued by the High Court of Justiciary (sitting as the Court of Appeal) and the Sheriff Appeal Court. The High Court guideline can issue guideline judgments under powers granted by Sections 118(7) and 189(7) of the Criminal Procedure (Scotland) Act 1995, and power to issue guidelines judgments is granted to the Sheriff Appeal Court by Section 48 of the Courts Reform (Scotland) Act 2014.

In guideline judgments the judges or Appeal Sheriffs can give guidance on how sentencing should be handled in similar cases. Such guidelines are binding on other judges and sheriffs (for High Court guideline judgments) and on other sheriffs (for Sheriff Appeal Court judgments). The Sentencing Council will need to prepare or modify sentencing guidelines in response to such judgments.

However, in 2007 a study by Millie, Tombs and Hough, comparing sentencing decisions between Scotland and England & Wales, noted that Scotland did not have a well developed body of guideline judgments, and that Sheriffs, Senators, and Justices of the Peace tended to consider how a sentenced might be perceived by the Court of Criminal Appeal. The authors also noted that judges in Scotland would welcome more guidance from the Appeal Court. The Scottish Sentencing Council's own website, as of 22 April 2017, only listed 5 guideline judgments for solemn cases, and 1 guideline judgment for summary cases. There were a further 7 cases that the Council regarded as providing guidance, but these were not issued under the Criminal Procedure (Scotland) Act 1995.

== Sentencing guidelines ==
=== Business Plan 2015 to 2018 ===
The first set of sentencing guidelines the Scottish Sentencing Council will seek to develop are guidelines on wildlife and environmental offences, and causing death by dangerous driving. Both are areas that are seen as complex, and can lead to difficult sentencing decisions.

=== Death by dangerous driving ===
The Falkirk Herald ran a campaign piece on 3 December 2016, on causing death by dangerous driving, where it highlighted public discontent with the apparent leniency of sentencing decisions in such cases. The Falkirk Herald stated that despite the maximum penalty for causing death by dangerous driving being 14 years imprisonment, the average sentence between 2005 and 2015 was 4.8 years. It was their hope the council would address this.

== Membership ==
=== Categories ===
The categories of membership for the Scottish Sentencing Council are laid down in Schedule 1 of the Criminal Justice and Licensing (Scotland) Act 2010. Schedule 1 states that the Lord Justice Clerk is chair of the Council ex officio (by right of office), with 5 other judicial members of appointed by the Lord Justice General after consultation with the Scottish Ministers. The judicial members include a judge of the Outer House who sat in the High Court of Jusiciary, a sheriff (who was not sheriff principal), 2 summary sheriffs or justices of the peace, and a sheriff principal. The remaining members are appointed by the Scottish Minister, who must consult the Lord Justice General.

The non-judicial members of the Council include a prosecutor (Advocate Depute or procurator fiscal) from the Crown Office, an advocate, a solicitor, a constable, a victims' rights representative, and one further lay member.

=== Appointment process ===
Appointment of the judicial and legally qualified members is regulated by The Scottish Sentencing Council (Procedure for Appointment of Members) Regulations 2015, which require the Lord Justice General to convene a panel to hear applications for positions open to sheriffs, summary sheriffs, justices of the peace, advocate, and solicitor. The panel is recommend persons for appointment. At the same time, the Lord Justice General must consult the Dean of the Faculty of Advocates and the President of the Law Society of Scotland before appointing an advocate or solicitor. The prosecutor is nominated by the Lord Advocate, and a Senator and sheriff principal can nominate themselves.

=== Current Council members ===
The members of the Scottish Sentencing Council as of 19 March 2026 were:

Members of the Scottish Sentencing Council
Name	Membership category	Other details
Lord Beckett	Lord Justice Clerk	ex officio Chair of the Council
Lady Drummond	Senator	Not specified
Sheriff Scott Pattison	Sheriff	
Summary Sheriff Joanna McDonald	Summary Sheriff	
Summary Sheriff Alison Michie	Summary Sheriff	
Position Vacant	Justice of the Peace	
Lindsey Miller	Prosecutor	
Victoria Young	Advocate	
Joanne McMillan	Solicitor	
DCC Bex Smith	Constable	Deputy Chief Constable of Police Scotland
Lynn Burns	Victims' expert	
Dr Jay Gormley	Lay member	Academic at the University of Glasgow and an Adviser to the Sentencing Academy

== Secretariat ==
The Scottish Sentencing Council is supported by a secretariat which is provided by the Scottish Courts and Tribunals Service, as required by order of the Scottish Ministers in The Scottish Courts and Tribunals Service (Administrative Support) (Specified Persons) Order 2015, under a power granted by Section 62 of the Judiciary and Courts (Scotland) 2008.

The Secretariat is headed up by Ondine Tennant, who was appointed in October 2014, and holds an LLB (Hons) in Law and Politics from the University of Edinburgh. She previously worked for the Scottish Civil Justice Council. She is supported by various policy, legal, communication, and research officers.
