= Sheriff Appeal Court =

- Scottish version of the Royal Coat of Arms as used by the courts in Scotland
- Established: Criminal: September 22, 2015; 11 years ago Civil: January 1, 2016; 10 years ago
- Jurisdiction: Scotland
- Location: Parliament House, Edinburgh (civil); Justiciary Building, Edinburgh (criminal)
- Composition method: Appointed by the Lord President
- Authorised by: Courts Reform (Scotland) Act 2014
- Appeals to: Criminal: Appeals on points of law to High Court of Justiciary; Civil: Appeals on points of law to Inner House of the Court of Session
- Judge term length: 5 years (except sheriffs principal who hold office ex officio)
- Website: www.scotcourts.gov.uk

The Sheriff Appeal Court (Scottish Gaelic: Cùirt Ath-thagraidh an t-Siorraim) is a court in Scotland that hears appeals from summary criminal proceedings in the sheriff courts and justice of the peace courts, and hears appeals on bail decisions made in solemn proceedings in the sheriff court. The Sheriff Appeal Court also hears appeals in civil cases from the sheriff courts, including the Sheriff Personal Injury Court.

The Sheriff Appeal Court was established for criminal appeals on 22 September 2015, as part of Lord Gill’s Scottish Civil Courts Reforms, to deal with criminal appeals. The bench, there is no jury, generally comprises two or three appeal sheriffs depending on the type of appeal to be considered. Bail hearings are presided over by a single appeal sheriff. The criminal court sits in the Justiciary Building in the Lawnmarket in Edinburgh.

The court's jurisdiction was extended to civil appeals on 1 September 2016, before that date civil appeals were heard either by the sheriff principal for each sheriffdom or by the Inner House of Court of Session.

== History ==
=== Scottish Civil Courts Review ===
The Sheriff Appeal Court's foundation was one of the results of, then Lord Justice Clerk, Lord Gill's Scottish Civil Courts Review (published in 2009), which identified several ways in which civil justice could be expedited through improving access to justice, reducing costs for parties litigant, and reducing the time to conclusion of cases. Lord Gill was critical of the civil justice system in place at the time, describing it as "a Victorian model that had survived by means of periodic piecemeal reforms", and concluding that, "It is failing the litigant and it is failing society."

=== Civil appeals ===
Lord Gill identified that 1/3 of civil appeals to the Inner House came from the sheriff courts, and that 2/3 of appeals from sheriff courts came direct (bypassing the sheriffs principal.) Most of these appeals did not raise complex questions of law and thus could be dealt with by a new national court. So he recommended the creation of the Sheriff Appeal Court to deal with these appeals. He did propose that, with leave, further appeals could be made to the Inner House, and this would allow for complex or important questions of law to be dealt with by the Senators of the College of Justice in the Supreme Courts of Scotland. Lord Gill's proposal was to extended the ability to apply for leave to appeal to small claims actions, where no such ability had existed before.

The Scottish Government, in 2010, accepted the analysis by Lord Gill there were problems facing the civil courts of Scotland. The Scottish Government recognised that costs were rising, there were excessive delays, and too many rescheduled hearings. They agreed that the courts system should be able to manage at which level a case was heard. In Scotland it had been up to the pursuer to choose whether to initiate a case in either the sheriff courts or the Court of Session, as they both shared concurrent jurisdiction for all civil cases with a value greater than £5,000. The Scottish Government proposed increasing this limit to £150,000, but the final limit was set at £100,000 by Section 39 of the Courts Reform (Scotland) Act 2014. They also agreed with the establishment of the Sheriff Appeal Court to handle civil appeals from the sheriff courts of Scotland.

=== Criminal appeals ===
Lord Gill recommended that appeals against conviction and sentence from the justice of the peace and sheriff courts in summary procedure should be remitted to the Sheriff Appeal Court, rather than, as previously, the High Court of Justiciary. Lord Gill also recommended that judgments of the court in criminal appeals should be binding on sheriffs throughout Scotland, as Lord Gill recommended:

The decisions of the court would be binding on sheriffs throughout Scotland, to allow the creation of a consistent and coherent body of case law.

— Report of the Scottish Civil Courts Review (Volume 1) p. 21, Lord Gill

The expectation was that this would expedite appeals from summary proceedings in the sheriff and justice of the peace courts.

The Scottish Government accepted Lord Gill's recommendation on criminal appeals, and asserted that would lead to the more coherent and consistent body of case law that Lord Gill sought. The Scottish Government proposed that the Sheriff Appeal Court would be composed of the 6 sheriffs principal of Scotland, plus six full-time Appeal Sheriffs. The view taken by the Scottish Government was that all appeals would be centrally managed, with the sheriffs principal able to hear appeals from any sheriffdom (and not just from their own).

=== Courts Reform (Scotland) Act 2014 ===
The Scottish Government took the reforms to the Scottish Parliament in the Courts Reform (Scotland) Bill on 6 February 2014, and the Bill (as amended) received Royal Assent on 6 May 2015 becoming the Courts Reform (Scotland) Act 2014. It was through the amendments process that the limit for civil actions in the exclusive jurisdiction of the sheriff courts was reduced to £100,000

The Justice Committee considered the proposals in the Courts Reform (Scotland) Bill and published a report on 9 May 2014. In that report the Committee agreed with the creation of a Sheriff Appeal Court to hear both civil appeals and appeals for summary proceedings in the justice of the peace and sheriff courts. They did stipulate that appeals should be heard in the sheriffdom from which the case originates. The Committee also noted support for the establishment for the Sheriff Appeal Court from the Scottish Legal Aid Board, Compass Chambers, Justice Scotland, the Law Society of Scotland, and Citizens Advice Scotland.

However, the Faculty of Advocates rejected both the creation of the Sheriff Appeal Court and the increase in the limit for exclusive jurisdiction of the sheriff courts for civil cases. The Faculty asserted that the Court of Session was already effective in dealing with civil cases, would remove choice for the litigant, and would deny them the right to appoint counsel (an advocate.) The Faculty's concerns were also related to the Sheriff Personal Injury Court. As there was an existing common law test that required a sheriff court to sanction the use of counsel in a case. The Faculty was also concerned that removing low-value cases from the Court of Session would deny advocates who are early in their career the opportunity develop their litigation skills, and thus make it harder for them to be ready to handle high-value or complex cases.

By the nature of things, it may be in relatively straightforward cases at the lower value end of the spectrum that advocates can obtain the experience early in their careers which equips them, as their careers develop, to undertake higher value complex litigation.

— Response to Courts Reform (Scotland) Bill, Faculty of Advocates

Thus, they concluded the reforms could harm the long term viability of the legal profession in Scotland.

As it was, the Scottish Parliament passed the Courts Reform (Scotland) Act 2014 which, in Section 108, requires any sheriff court (including the Sheriff Appeal Court) to grant sanction for the use of counsel where the court considers that the case is likely to be difficult or complex, or important or of requisite value. At the same time no party should be allowed an advantage over an other through the use of an advocate.

=== Commencement ===
On 22 September 2015, the Sheriff Appeal Court was established to deal with criminal appeals. On 1 January 2016, Scottish Ministers by Scottish Statutory Instrument commenced the provisions of the Court Reform (Scotland) Act 2014 to extended civil appeals to the Sheriff Appeal Court.

=== Performance ===
The first ten years of the Sheriff Appeal Court were celebrated as highly successful in reducing delays in process and in enhancing consistency of sentencing. Between 2016 and October 2025 there were only 19 motions to remit an appeal to the Inner House.

== Remit and jurisdiction ==
=== Criminal jurisdiction ===
The Sheriff Appeal Court has exclusive jurisdiction for all appeals in summary criminal proceedings and appeals relating to bail decisions, in both summary and solemn proceedings, from the sheriff courts and justice of the peace courts. Decisions of the Sheriff Appeal Court may only be appealed to the High Court of Justiciary with the permission of the Sheriff Appeal Court or the High Court.

=== Civil jurisdiction ===
The Sheriff Appeal Court has exclusive jurisdiction for all appeals in civil proceedings at first instance in the sheriff courts of Scotland, replacing the prior appeal to the sheriffs principal of the six sheriffdoms of Scotland, and the automatic right of appeal to the Inner House of the Court of Session. A bench of three Appeal Sheriffs sits to hear appeals on civil cases raised under ordinary cause, with summary cause, small claims, and procedural business decided by a single Appeal Sheriff. Cases can only be appealed to the Inner House with the permission of either the Sheriff Appeal Court or the Court of Session. All judgments of the Sheriff Appeal Court in civil cases establish binding precedent on all sheriffs and in all sheriffdoms throughout Scotland.

The civil jurisdiction of the Sheriff Appeal Court was established on 1 January 2016. With civil appeals regulated by Act of Sederunt (Sheriff Appeal Court Rules) 2015, an Act of Sederunt made by the Court of Session on 21 October 2015, and which had come into force by 1 January 2016.

=== Guideline and binding judgments ===
Decisions made by the Sheriff Appeal Court in civil appeals are binding on all sheriffs throughout Scotland, and decisions are also binding on the Sheriff Appeal Court itself. The Sheriff Appeal Court can only overturn a prior precedent by convening a larger bench of Appeal Sheriffs than the bench that set the precedent. Previously, civil appeals to a sheriff principal were only binding on the sheriffs in the sheriffdom for which the sheriff principal was responsible. Such binding judgments are established by Section 48 of the Courts Reform (Scotland) Act 2014, so that when the Sheriff Appeal Court makes a decision on a question of law it is binding in every sheriffdom for every sheriff court and every justice of the peace court. Such precedent is also binding on solemn proceeding where a sheriff sits with a jury.

The Sheriff Appeal Court can issue guideline judgments for criminal proceedings, where the Appeal Sheriffs give guidance on how sentencing should be handled in similar cases. Such judgments require the Scottish Sentencing Council to prepare or modify sentencing guidelines. The power for the Sheriff Appeal Court to issue guideline judgments is granted by Section 48 of the Courts Reform (Scotland) Act 2014.

=== Remitting and referring cases to Supreme Courts ===
The Sheriff Appeal Court can remit (transfer) a case to the Court of Session under Section 112 of the Courts Reform (Scotland) Act 2014, which allows for the Inner House to deal with complex or novel questions of law. The case can be remitted at the request of either party to a case.

The Sheriff Appeal Court can refer questions of law to the High Court of Justiciary under Section 120 of the 2014 Act. The referral can be granted either at the request of either party litigant, or on the Court's own initiative. The High Court is then able to answer the question of law, and to further direct the Sheriff Appeal Court on how to deal with the appeal.

==== Section 112 civil remittance ====
The Sheriff Appeal Court can remit an appeal to the Inner House under Section 112 of the Courts Reform (Scotland) Act 2014 provided an application is made by a party to the case and,

Remit of appeal from the Sheriff Appeal Court to the Court of Session

(1) This section applies in relation to an appeal to the Sheriff Appeal Court against a decision of a sheriff in civil proceedings.
(2) The Sheriff Appeal Court may—

(a) on the application of a party to the appeal,

and

(b) if satisfied that the appeal raises a complex or novel point of law, remit the appeal to the Court of Session.

(3) Where an appeal is remitted to the Court of Session under subsection (2), the Court of Session may deal with and dispose of the appeal as if it had originally been made direct to that Court.

— Section 112 Remit of appeal from the Sheriff Appeal Court to the Court of Session, Courts Reform (Scotland) Act 2014

Once remitted the case is treated as though the appeal began with the Court of Session. An application to remit an appeal to the Inner House of the Court of Session was rejected by the Sheriff Appeal Court, as advised by Lord Drummond Young sitting as a Lord Ordinary, in the case of First Time Limited vs Alexander Fraser (Liquidator of Denmore Investments Limited). Sheriff Principal Murrary stated:

The motion was refused. The court was not satisfied that the case raises a novel or complex point of law which satisfies the statutory test to warrant a remit to the Court of Session. For such to be the case this court requires to find that the case raises a point of wider interest which will have general application. We preferred the submission of the respondent to the effect that the case should not be viewed as having the prospect of establishing an important precedent.

— Sheriff Principal Murray, First Time Limited vs Alexander Fraser (Liquidator of Denmore Investments Limited)

The Appeal Sheriffs believe that the appellants arguments would potentially allow for the case to be resolved without proof, and that no significant question of law was at stake, nor was there any compelling public interest.

==== Section 120 criminal referral ====
The Sheriff Appeal Court can refer a point of law to the High Court of Justiciary:

Power to refer points of law for the opinion of the High Court

(1) In an appeal under this Part, the Sheriff Appeal Court may refer a point of law to the High Court for its opinion if it considers that the point is a complex or novel one.
(2) The Sheriff Appeal Court may make a reference under subsection (1)—

(a) on the application of a party to the appeal proceedings,

or

(b) on its own initiative.

— 120 Power to refer points of law for the opinion of the High Court, Courts Reform (Scotland) Act 2014

Unlike a remittance of a case to the Court of Session, the Sheriff Appeal Court can refer a point of law on its own initiative under Section 120 Paragraph (2)(b). The High Court is empowered by this section to direct further the procedure or judgment of the appeal.

=== Rules of the Court ===
The rules for the Sheriff Appeals Court are contained in Chapter 19 of the Criminal Procedures Rules 1996 (for criminal appeals) and the Sheriff Appeal Court Rules (Civil) (for civil appeals). The rules for criminal appeals were instituted by the High Court of Justiciary by Act of Adjournal which came into force on 22 September 2015, and the civil rules were instituted by the Court of Session through Act of Sederunt that came into force on 1 January 2016.

== Judges and office holders ==
=== Appeal sheriffs ===
The judges of the Sheriff Appeal Court are known as appeal sheriffs, with all sheriffs principal ex officio being appeal sheriffs. To be eligible for appointment as an appeal sheriff a person must have served at least five years as a sheriff. Appeal sheriffs also hear appeals in civil cases that previously went to the sheriff principal.

=== President and Vice-President ===
The President of the Court is Sheriff Principal Mhairi Stephen, QC, whose sheriffdom is Lothian and Borders, and the Vice President of the Court is Sheriff Principal Ian Abercrombie, QC, who sheriffdom is South Strathclyde, Dumfries and Galloway. There are a further 15 appeal sheriffs, including all of the other serving sheriffs principal.

=== Clerk to the Court ===
The administration of the court is the responsibility of the Clerk of the Sheriff Appeal Court, who is assisted by a Deputy Clerk – Criminal and a Deputy Clerk – Civil. The clerk has significant responsibility for arranging hearings of the court, handling documents from litigants, and preparing copies for any party to the case.

=== Current judges ===
The President Sheriff is Principal Mhairi Stephen, QC and the Vice President is Sheriff Principal Ian Abercrombie, QC. The other current appeals sheriffs are available on the Scotland Judiciary website.
