= Courts of Scotland =

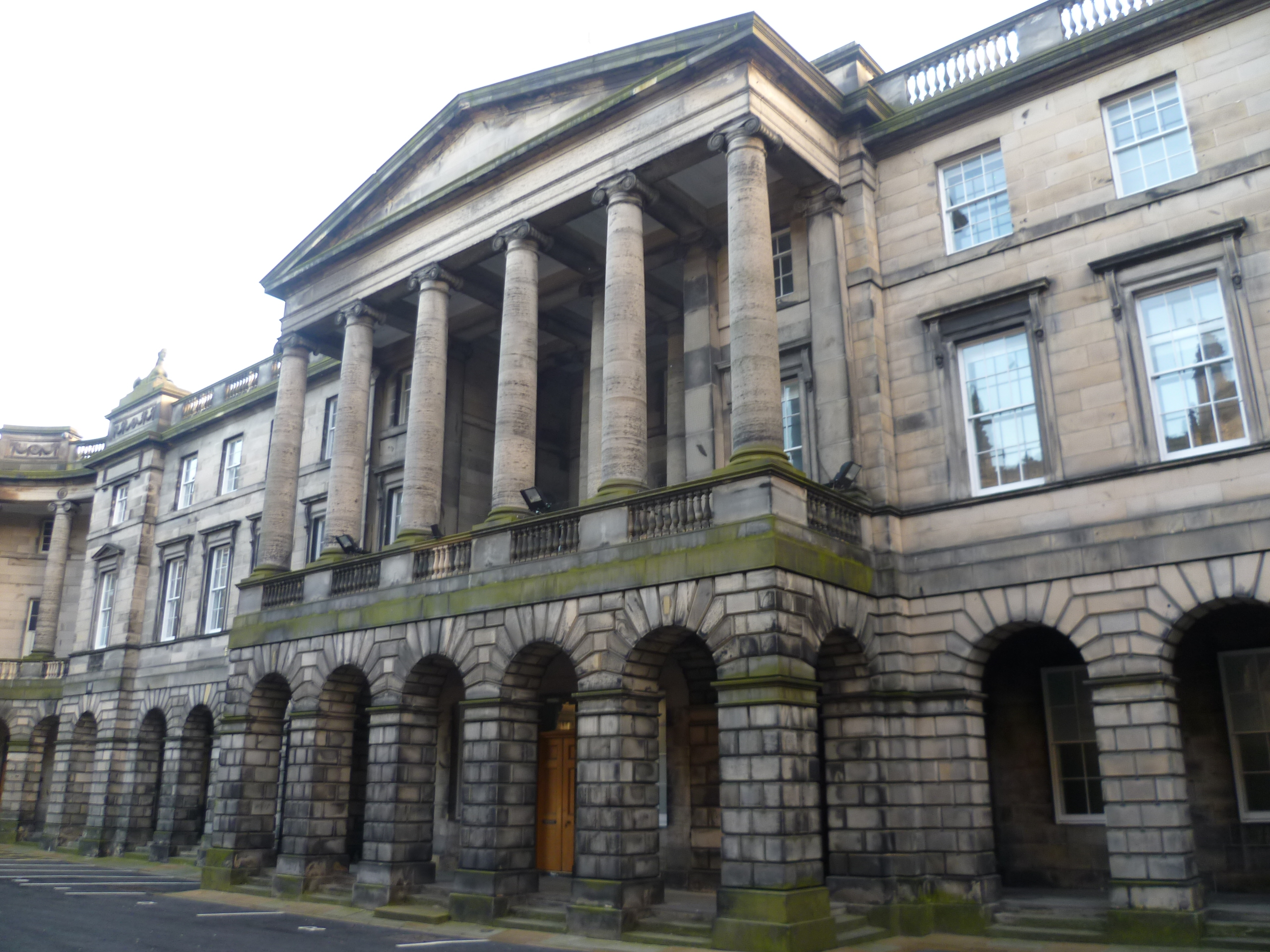
Judges' entrance to Parliament House, the home of the Supreme Courts of Scotland, in Parliament Square, Edinburgh.

The courts of Scotland (Scottish Gaelic: Cùirtean na h-Alba) are responsible for administration of justice in Scotland, under statutory, common law and equitable provisions within Scots law. The courts are presided over by the judiciary of Scotland, who are the various judicial office holders responsible for issuing judgments, ensuring fair trials, and deciding on sentencing. The Court of Session is the supreme civil court of Scotland, subject to appeals to the Supreme Court of the United Kingdom, and the High Court of Justiciary is the supreme criminal court, which is only subject to the authority of the Supreme Court of the United Kingdom on devolution issues and human rights compatibility issues.

The judiciary of Scotland, except the Lord Lyon King of Arms, are united under the leadership and authority of the Lord President and Lord Justice General, who is the president of the Court of Session and High Court of Justiciary. The Court of Session has the authority, under the Courts Reform (Scotland) Act 2014, to regulate civil procedure through passing subordinate legislation knows as Acts of Sederunt, and the High Court of Justiciary has the authority to regulate criminal procedure through passing Acts of Adjournal. Both Acts of Sederunt and Acts of Adjournal have the capacity to amend primary legislation where it deals with civil or criminal procedure respectively.

The majority of criminal and civil justice in Scotland is handled by the local sheriff courts, which are arranged into six sheriffdoms led by a sheriff principal. The sheriff courts have exclusive jurisdiction over all civil cases with a monetary value up to £100,000, and are able to try criminal cases both on complaint for summary offences, and with a jury for indictable offences. Treason, murder, and rape are in the exclusive jurisdiction of the High Court of Justiciary, and whilst the High Court and sheriff courts have concurrent jurisdiction over armed robbery, drug trafficking, and sexual offences involving children virtually all these cases are heard by the High Court.

Administration for the courts is provided by the Scottish Courts and Tribunals Service, a non-ministerial department of the Scottish Government. The Scottish Courts and Tribunal Service is operationally independent of the Scottish Ministers, and is governed by a corporate board chaired by the Lord President, and with a majority of judicial members.

There are various specialist courts and tribunals with specialist jurisdictions, which are subject to the ultimate jurisdiction of either the Court of Session or High Court of Justiciary. Children under the age of 16 who face allegations of criminal conduct are dealt with through the Children's Hearings, which are quasi-judicial in nature. Disputes involving agricultural tenancies and crofting are dealt with by the Scottish Land Court, and disputes about private rights in titles for land ownership and land valuation are dealt with by the Lands Tribunal for Scotland. Heraldry is regulated in Scotland both by the civil and criminal law, with prosecutions taken before the Court of the Lord Lyon.

Defunct and historical courts include the Admiralty Court, Court of Exchequer, district courts, and the High Court of Constabulary.

== Background ==
Schematic of court system for Scotland

The United Kingdom does not have a single judicial system – England and Wales have one system, Scotland another, and Northern Ireland a third. The military courts of the United Kingdom have jurisdiction over all members of the armed forces of the United Kingdom and civilians subject to service discipline in relation to offences against military law. The Supreme Court of the United Kingdom operates across all three separate jurisdictions, hearing some civil – but not criminal – appeals in Scottish cases, and determining certain devolution and human rights issues.

== Supreme Court of the United Kingdom ==
The Supreme Court of the United Kingdom was created on 1 October 2009 by the Constitutional Reform Act 2005. The Supreme Court hears civil appeals from the Court of Session, and it hears appeals from all the civil and criminal courts of England and Wales and of Northern Ireland. The Supreme Court has no authority to hear appeals on criminal matters from the High Court of Justiciary. Until the creation of the Supreme Court, ultimate appeal lay to the House of Lords, a chamber of the Parliament of the United Kingdom (though in modern practice only the Law Lords sitting in the Appellate Committee, rather than the whole House, heard appeals). The Supreme Court took over the judicial functions of the House of Lords, and also assumed the jurisdiction over devolution and human rights issues vested in the Judicial Committee of the Privy Council.

Cases involving "devolution issues" arising under the Scotland Act 1998, as amended by the Scotland Act 2016, which includes disputes regarding the validity of Acts of the Scottish Parliament or executive functions of the Scottish Government, are heard by the Supreme Court. These cases may reach the Court as follows:

- The Court of Session may remit a case to the Supreme Court.
- The High Court of Justiciary can refer a point of law to the Supreme Court.
- The Law Officers of the Crown (namely the Lord Advocate, Attorney General for England and Wales, and Advocate General for Scotland) may refer a bill from the Scottish Parliament to the Supreme Court.
- Any court, if a Law Officer so desires, may refer a case to the Supreme Court.
- Law Officers may refer any issue not related to a bill or case to the Supreme Court.
- The parties to a case may appeal a case from the Inner House of the Court of Session.

== Civil courts ==
=== Historical ===
The Court system in its modern form is based on the reforms introduced by Lord Gill as Lord President, and implemented or further modified under the Lord Presidency of Lord Carloway. The foundational legislation for the sheriff courts and many other changes is the Courts Reform (Scotland) Act 2014.

=== Court of Session ===
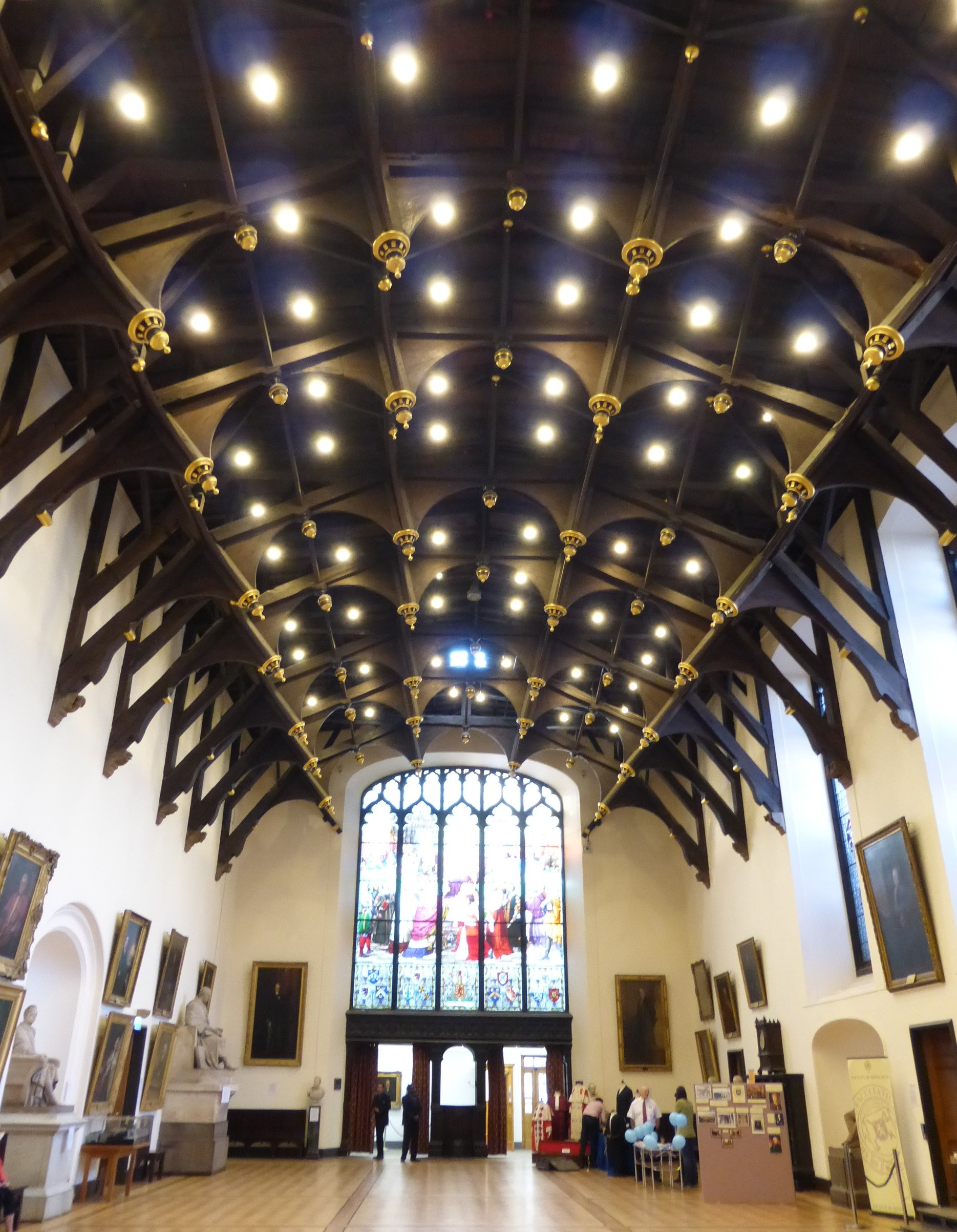
Parliament Hall inside Parliament House, Edinburgh

The Court of Session is the supreme civil court. It is both a court of first instance and a court of appeal, and sits exclusively in Parliament House in Edinburgh. The court of first instance is known as the Outer House, the court of appeal the Inner House. It includes specialized commercial court provisions: "The Court of Session has for many years had special provisions for dealing with commercial actions to enable specialist judges to handle commercial cases quickly and flexibly."

=== Sheriff Appeal Court ===
The Sheriff Appeal Court is a national court with a jurisdiction over civil appeals from the sheriff courts, and replaces appeals previously made to the sheriffs principal.

The Sheriff Appeal Court is a national court with a jurisdiction over appeals in summary criminal proceedings, and bail decisions in solemn procedure, from the sheriff courts and justice of the peace courts. The Sheriff Appeal Court had its jurisdiction extended on 1 January 2016, when the provisions of the Court Reform (Scotland) Act 2014 to extend civil appeals to the Sheriff Appeal Court were brought into force by the Scottish Ministers.

=== Sheriff Personal Injury Court ===
The Sheriff Personal Injury Court is a specialist all-Scotland court with exclusive competence to hear cases, with and without a jury, that relate to personal injury. The Personal Injury Court has concurrent jurisdiction with local sheriff courts, over claims relating to personal injury where the case is for a work-related accident claim in excess of £1,000, or where the total amount claimed is in excess of £5,000. The choice of local sheriff court or the Personal Injury Court is left to the pursuer. However, where a sheriff believes the case is so complex as to require the specialist expertise of the personal injury sheriffs they can remit the case to the Sheriff Personal Injury Court. In Scotland, all monetary claims for amounts not in excess of £100,000 are in the exclusive jurisdiction of the sheriff courts, with the Court of Session having concurrent jurisdiction for amounts of more than £100,000.

The Personal Injury Court was established by the Courts Reform (Scotland) Act 2014 and the All-Scotland Sheriff Court (Sheriff Personal Injury Court) Order 2015.

=== Sheriff court ===
The sheriff courts are the other civil courts; they sit locally. The Court of Session and sheriff courts have a co-extensive jurisdiction for all cases with a monetary value in excess of £100,000, with the choice of court being given in the first place to the pursuer (the claimant), the majority of difficult or high-value cases in Scotland are brought in the Court of Session. Any final decision of a sheriff may be appealed against. There is a right of appeal in civil cases to the Sheriff Appeal Court, and, with permission, to the Inner House of the Court of Session.

== Criminal courts ==
=== High Court of Justiciary ===
The High Court of Justiciary is the supreme criminal court. The High Court is both a court of first instance and also a court of appeal. As a court of first instance, the High Court sits mainly in the Justiciary Building in the Lawnmarket in Edinburgh and in the Justiciary Buildings in the Saltmarket in Glasgow, but also sits from time to time in various other places in Scotland. As a court of appeal, it sits only in Edinburgh. Appeals may be made to the High Court of Justiciary sitting as the Court of Criminal Appeal from the lower courts in criminal cases. An appeal may also be made to the High Court if the High Court itself heard the case at first instance. Two judges sit to hear an appeal against sentence, and three judges sit to hear an appeal against conviction.

There is no further appeal from the High Court's decision on appeal, in contrast to the Court of Session, from which it is possible to appeal to the Supreme Court of the United Kingdom, the highest court. Appeals under the Human Rights Act 1998 and devolution appeals under the Scotland Act 1998 are heard by the Supreme Court of the United Kingdom (previously these were head by the Judicial Committee of the Privy Council).

=== Sheriff Appeal Court ===
The Sheriff Appeal Court is a national court with jurisdiction over appeals from summary criminal proceedings in the sheriff courts and justice of the peace courts, and from bail decision in solemn procedure at the sheriff court.

The Sheriff Appeal Court was established on 22 September 2015 to deal with appeals against conviction and sentence in summary proceedings before the deal with criminal appeals. The bench generally comprises three appeal sheriffs when considering appeals against conviction, and two appeal sheriffs when considering appeals against sentence. A single appeal sheriff hears appeals against bail decisions made by a sheriff or justices of the peace. The court is based at the courthouse at Lawnmarket, Edinburgh, and initially sat on two consecutive days each fortnight. Substantive criminal appeals are now heard on Tuesdays and appeals against sentence on Wednesdays.

=== Sheriff courts ===
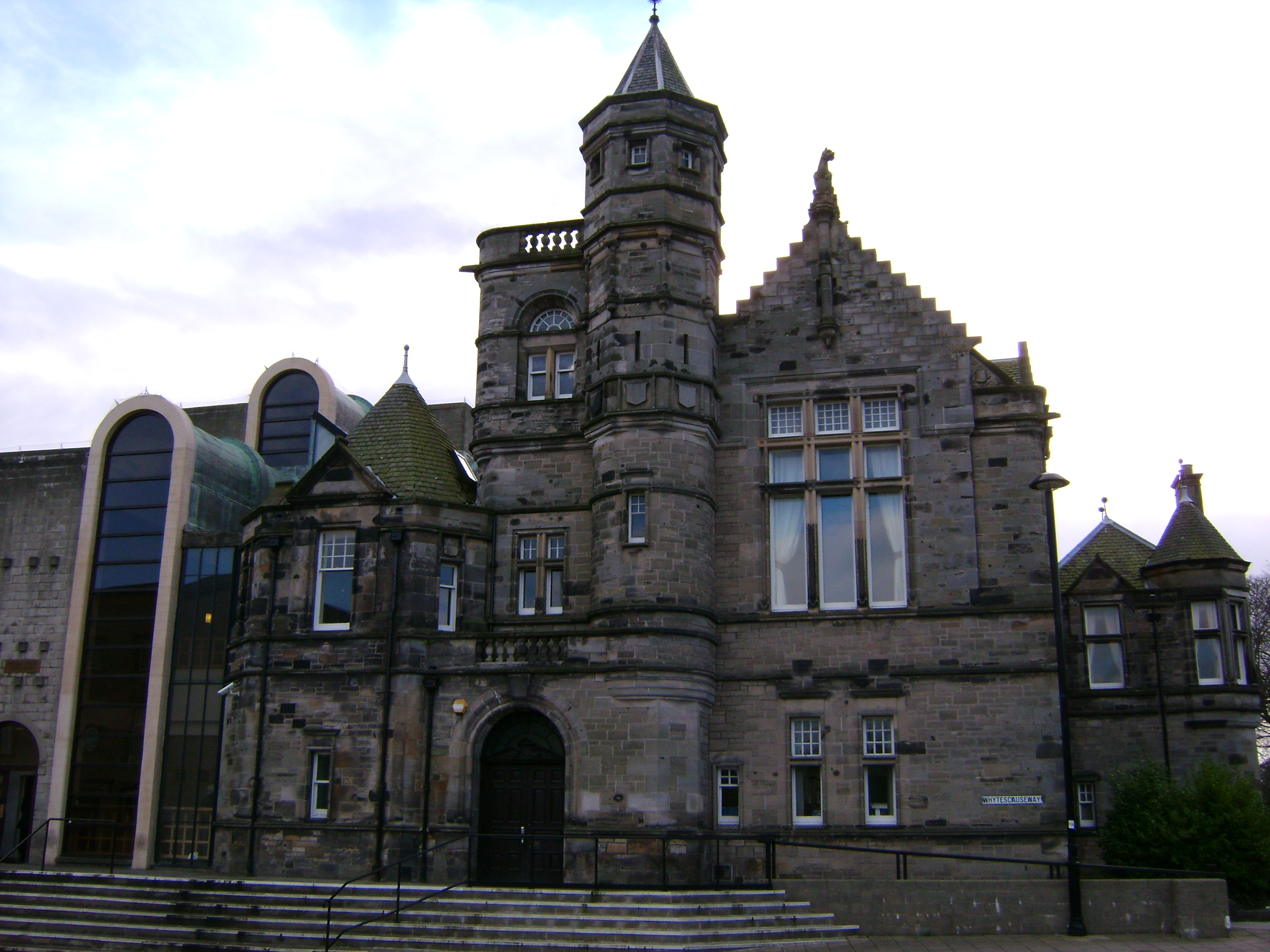
An example of a sheriff court, in Kirkcaldy

The sheriff courts are the main criminal courts; they sit locally in sheriff courts throughout Scotland organised in the six sheriffdoms. The procedure followed may either be solemn procedure, where the Sheriff sits with a jury of fifteen; or summary procedure, where the sheriff sits alone in a bench trial. From 10 December 2007, the maximum penalty that may be imposed in summary cases is 12 months imprisonment or a £10,000 fine, and in solemn cases 5 years imprisonment or an unlimited fine.

A higher sentence in solemn cases may be imposed upon remittance of the case to the High Court of Justiciary.

=== Justice of the peace courts ===
Justice of the peace courts are criminal courts which sit locally under summary procedure, where the justice sits alone or in some areas as a bench of three. Justices are lay magistrates who as advised by a legally qualified clerk, known as the legal adviser. The court handles a variety of minor common law crimes such as breach of the peace, theft and assault, as well as statutory offences such as vandalism, road traffic offences and other public order offences. The maximum penalty which can be imposed at this level is 60 days' imprisonment or a fine up to £2,500.

== Specialist courts ==
Scotland has several courts with specialist jurisdictions.

=== Children's hearings ===
The specialist system of children's hearings handles the majority of cases involving allegations of criminal conduct involving persons under 16 in Scotland. These tribunals have wide-ranging powers to issue supervision orders for the person referred to them by the Scottish Children's Reporter Administration. Serious crimes, at the direction of a procurator fiscal, are still dealt with in the usual criminal courts.

=== Court of the Lord Lyon ===
The Court of the Lord Lyon, the standing court of heraldry and genealogy, is responsible for civil and criminal enforcement of armorial bearings and the right to use certain titles. It is headed by the Lord Lyon, who is King of Arms and senior herald for Scotland.

=== Lands Valuation Appeal Court ===
The Lands Valuation Appeal Court is a Scottish civil court, composed of three Court of Session judges, and established under section 7 of the Valuation of Lands (Scotland) Amendment Act 1879. It hears cases where the decision of a local Valuation Appeal Committee is disputed. The senators who make up the Lands Valuation Appeal Court were specified in 2013 by the Act of Sederunt (Lands Valuation Appeal Court) 2013, which has both Lord Carloway (Lord President) and Lady Dorrian (Lord Justice Clerk) as members with a further four senators specified.

=== Scottish Land Court ===
The Scottish Land Court has jurisdiction over disputes involving agricultural tenancies and crofting rights.

=== General Assembly of the Church of Scotland ===
Under the terms of the Church of Scotland Act 1921 the General Assembly of the Church of Scotland has sole jurisdiction over its own spiritual affairs, including matters of discipline.

== Scottish tribunals ==
There are several specialist tribunals in Scotland which often have exclusive jurisdiction over cases relevant to their remit. They are subject to the oversight and ultimate authority of the Court of Session, which can review decisions through either a final appeal or through judicial review.

- Lands Tribunal for Scotland: title and land obligations
- Scottish Charity Appeals Panel
- Mental Health Tribunal for Scotland
- Pensions Appeal Tribunals for Scotland
- Scottish Solicitors' Discipline Tribunal

== United Kingdom tribunals ==
There are several tribunals that have jurisdiction either over the whole United Kingdom, or over Great Britain. Where these tribunals make an adjudication in Scotland they are subject to the oversight and ultimate authority of the Court of Session, which can review decisions either through a final appeal or through judicial review. When an Employment Tribunal makes a determination in Scotland it is subject to practice directions from the President of Employment Tribunals (Scotland), and operates under Scots law. These tribunals are administered by His Majesty's Courts and Tribunals Service.

In many cases there is a statutory right of appeal from a tribunal either to an upper tribunal or senior tribunal, or to the Court of Session: for example Employment Tribunal cases are appealed to the Employment Appeal Tribunal, which in turn allows appeals to the Court of Session. In the absence of a specific appeals court, the only remedy from a decision of a Tribunal is an appeal to, or judicial review by, the Court of Session, which will often be more limited in scope than an appeal.

Tribunals

- Copyright Tribunal
- Employment Tribunal
- Employment Appeal Tribunal
- First-tier Tribunal
- Investigatory Powers Tribunal
- Office of the Social Security Commissioners
- Special Immigration Appeals Commission
- Proscribed Organisations Appeal Commission
- Traffic Commissioners for Great Britain
- Upper Tribunal

== Historical courts and tribunals ==
=== Bill Chamber ===
The Bill Chamber was formerly a court of Scotland, often considered as part of the Court of Session but in fact separate from it. It dealt with petitions for suspension (appeal), interdict, sequestrations etc., and was the approximate equivalent to sittings in camera (in chambers) in American or English law.

The Bill Chamber was "under the same roof" as the Court of Session, but was a separate court or jurisdiction. Its history and function were discussed in the report of the Royal Commission on the Court of Session and the Office of Sheriff Principal (1927) which concluded "the usefulness of the Bill Chamber as a Court separate from the Court of Session no longer exists" and it was thus abolished by the Administration of Justice (Scotland) Act 1933.

Some of its processes are now carried out by the Accountant in Bankruptcy.

=== Court of Exchequer ===
Until 1856, there was a Court of Exchequer in Scotland, which was established Exchequer Court (Scotland) Act 1707, pursuant to a requirement of the Act of Union 1707 which stated:

And that there be a Court of Exchequer in Scotland after the Union, for deciding Questions concerning the Revenues of Customs and Excises there, having the same power and authority in such cases, as the Court of Exchequer has in England And that the said Court of Exchequer in Scotland have power of passing Signatures, Gifts Tutories, and in other things as the Court of Exchequer in Scotland hath; And that the Court of Exchequer that now is in Scotland do remain, until a New Court of Exchequer be settled by the Parliament of Great Britain in Scotland after the Union;

— Article 16, Act of Union 1707

The judges of the Court were the Barons of Exchequer who acted in both a judicial capacity, dealing with revenue cases, debts to the crown, seizure of smuggled goods and prosecutions for illicit brewing and distilling, and in an administrative capacity, mainly auditing accounts. The president of the Exchequer Court was known as the Chief Baron of Exchequer, and the initial president was the Lord High Treasurer. The 1707 Act limited the numbers of Barons to 5.

A separate Exchequer Court was abolished by the Exchequer Court (Scotland) Act 1856, and all of its powers were transferred to the Court of Session. With its abolishment no further Barons of Exchequer were appointed.

=== District courts ===
District courts are no longer in existence. They were introduced in 1975 and sat in each local council area under summary procedure only. The Scottish Government merged the management of the sheriff and justice of the peace courts (formerly known as district courts), retaining lay justices. The Criminal Proceedings etc. (Reform) (Scotland) Act 2007 enabled the Scottish Ministers to replace district courts by "justice of the peace courts". The process is concluded and all district courts are now abolished and replaced with the new justice of the peace courts throughout Scotland, which have strengthened powers to allow more cases to be dealt with at this level.

=== High Court of Constabulary ===
The High Court of Constabulary was a court in Scotland presided over by the Lord High Constable of Scotland and deputes appointed by the Lord High Constable. Established in the late 13th century the court was empowered to judge all cases of rioting, disorder, bloodshed, and murder if such crimes occurred within four miles of the King of Scots, the King's Council, or the Parliament of Scotland. Following James VI's move to England, the jurisdiction of the Lord High Constable was defined in terms of the "resident place" appointed for the Privy Council.

=== Jury Court ===
In 1815, the Jury Trials (Scotland) Act 1815 created the Jury Court to allow certain civil cases to be tried by jury. The Jury Court was subordinate to the Court of Session, and appeals were heard by the Inner House of the Court of Session. In 1830 the Jury Court, along with the Admiralty and Commissary Courts, was absorbed into the Court of Session following the enactment of the Court of Session Act 1830.

== See also ==
- Office of the Accountant of Court
- Judiciary of Scotland
- High Court of Justiciary
