= Sheriff Personal Injury Court =

- Royal Court of Arms of the United Kingdom as used by the Courts in Scotland
- 55.9479192°N 3.1907488°W
- Established: 22 September 2015; 9 years ago
- Jurisdiction: Scotland
- Location: Sheriff Court House, 27 Chambers Street, Edinburgh, EH1 1LB
- Coordinates: 55.9479192°N 3.1907488°W
- Composition method: Appointed by Sheriff Principal of Lothian and Borders
- Authorised by: Courts Reform (Scotland) Act 2014 and The All-Scotland Sheriff Court (Sheriff Personal Injury Court) Order 2015
- Appeals to: Sheriff Appeal Court
- Website: www.scotcourts.gov.uk/the-courts/sheriff-court/personal-injury-court

Sheriff Principal of Lothian and Borders
- Currently: Mhairi M. Stephen QC
- Since: 9 May 2011

The Sheriff Personal Injury Court is a Scottish court with exclusive competence over claims relating to personal injury where the case is for a work-related accident claim in excess of £1,000, where the total amount claimed is in excess of £5,000, or where a sheriff in a local sheriff court remits proceedings to the Personal Injury Court. It has concurrent jurisdiction with the Court of Session for all claims in excess of £100,000, and concurrent jurisdiction with the local sheriff courts for personal injury claims within its competence.

The choice of using a local sheriff court or the Personal Injury Court is left to the pursuer. However, if the sheriff believes the case is a complex one, requiring specialist expertise, then it can be remitted to the Personal Injury Court.

The Sheriff Personal Injury Court was established on 22 September 2015 by The All-Scotland Sheriff Court (Sheriff Personal Injury Court) Order 2015. The power to establish specialist, all-Scotland courts is derived from the Courts Reform (Scotland) Act 2014.

== History ==
=== Scottish Civil Courts Review ===
The Sheriff Personal Injury Court's foundation was one of the results of Lord Gill's Scottish Civil Courts Review (published in 2009), which identified several ways in which civil justice could be expedited through improving access to justice, reducing costs for parties litigant, and reducing the time to conclusion of cases. Lord Gill was critical of the civil justice system in place at the time, describing it as "a Victorian model that had survived by means of periodic piecemeal reforms", and concluding that, "It is failing the litigant and it is failing society."

=== All-Scotland specialist court ===
Lord Gill's report identified that many litigants and legal practitioners had been happy with the improvements to personal injury claims in the Court of Session by the introduction of new rules, but concluded that creating an all-Scotland specialist sheriff court for personal injury claims was the best option. This would relieve pressure on the Court of Session, and reduce cost to litigants as they would not need to engage an advocate or solicitor advocate as solicitors have the right of audience before the sheriff courts. At the same time, he allowed for the pursuer to a have a choice between the local sheriff court or the new specialist court in Edinburgh.

=== Exclusive jurisdiction ===
The report also recommended increasing the exclusive jurisdiction of the sheriff court to all claims of less than £150,000. A similar proposal was eventually implemented, but with exclusive jurisdiction limited to claims of less than £100,000.

Dominic Scullion (Solicitor Advocate) writing in The Scotsman in August 2015 commented on the increase in the exclusive jurisdiction of the sheriff courts to claims of less than £100,000 and the creation of the Personal Injury Court. Scullion identified that an advocate can only charge a separate fee for representation in the sheriff courts if the court certifies that the case requires counsel. If a certification is not granted the advocate and solicitor have to share the single fee paid by the client.

With it no longer being possible to raise a claim for less than £100,000 in the Court of Session, the Edinburgh-based Personal Injury Court could see costs for solicitors reduced as they will not need to travel to local sheriff courts. BTO Solicitors identified that a specialised court should be able to be more consistent in its judgments than would be possible from the various local sheriff courts spread throughout Scotland.

=== Jury trials ===
In Volume 2 of his review, Lord Gill also recommended that the new Personal Injury Court should be able to make use of both jury trials and the Chapter 43 rules of the Court of Session. Lord Gill concluded that judge-led trials tended to be more conservative in monetary awards, with juries being more perceptive and ready to award larger amounts. As such, early settlement (negotiated cases) would result in larger settlements as a consequence. He recommended that jury trials should be by right and not by exception.

=== Courts Reform (Scotland) Act 2014 ===
The Scottish Government responded to the Report from Lord Gill in November 2010. Following that, Lord Gill's recommendations were implemented in the Courts Reform (Scotland) Act 2014, with the Personal Injury Court established by The All-Scotland Sheriff Court (Sheriff Personal Injury Court) Order 2015.

== Remit and jurisdiction ==
=== Exclusive competence and concurrent jurisdiction ===
In Scotland, all monetary claims for amounts not in excess of £100,000 are in the exclusive jurisdiction of the sheriff courts, with the Court of Session having concurrent jurisdiction for amounts of more than £100,000. As such, the Sheriff Personal Injury Court has exclusive competence but concurrent jurisdiction with local sheriff courts over claims relating to personal injury where the case is for a work-related accident claim in excess of £1,000, or where the total amount claimed is in excess of £5,000. Where a sheriff believes the case is so complex as to require the specialist expertise of the personal injury sheriffs, they can remit the case to the Sheriff Personal Injury Court.

=== Time limits ===
Any personal injury action brought before a sheriff court, the Personal Injury Court, or the Court of Session is subject to a 3 year time limit.

=== Remit to Court of Session ===
Claims for personal injury with a value of under £100,000 can be remitted to the Court of Session by request of a sheriff under Section 92 of the Courts Reform (Scotland) Act 2014. A Lord Ordinary in the Outer House of the Court of Session will determine if the case can be remitted. The decision of the Lord Ordinary is not subject to appeal, and should a request to remit fail then the case will continue at the Personal Injury Court or a local sheriff court.

Remittance to the Court of Session will normally be considered when the case is of particular importance or complexity. This principle is incorporated into the Courts Reform (Scotland) Act 2014, which states:

On the application of any of the parties to the proceedings, the sheriff may, at any stage, request the Court of Session to allow the proceedings to be remitted to that Court if the sheriff considers that the importance or difficulty of the proceedings makes it appropriate to do so.

— Section 92(4), Courts Reform (Scotland) Act 2014

It is for the sheriff to make the determination whether or not a request to remit should be made.

==== Pelvic mesh cases ====
In 2016, four cases were remitted by Lord Boyd of Duncansby to the Outer House at the request of Sheriff Katherine Mackie in the Edinburgh Sheriff Court as the cases each represented "considerable public interest". The cases all related to vaginal tape and mesh products for the treatment of urinary incontinence or prolapse. In his judgment, Lord Boyd cited:

- There were 350 cases relating to pelvic mesh products before the Court of Session;
- All but one other case raised relating to pelvic mesh products had been raised in the Court of Session;
- Significant public interest was demonstrated through cases being raised in the Petitions Committee of the Scottish Parliament;
- That Practice Direction No. 2 of 2015 applied which stated that pelvic mesh cases should be dealt with under ordinary cause rules under Chapter 42A of the Rules of the Court of Session 1994, to an appointed Lord Ordinary.

== Procedure ==
=== Electronic disposal ===
Motions and interlocutors can and should be submitted to the Personal Injury Court by electronic means unless an application is made to the court to set aside this requirement. The clerks of court, under the direction the Sheriff Clerk of Edinburgh, are able to exercise quasi-judicial powers to grant motions which are "common and straightforward."

=== Chapter 43 Rules ===
Chapter 43 rules, first implemented by Act of Sederunt of the Court of Session in 2003, sought to bring about swift resolution through negotiation of cases by allowing for pre-proof discussions with all the relevant details. It was noted by the Scottish Courts and Tribunals Service that 95% of personal injury claims in the Court of Session were settled before proof. As such, these rules were extended to the new Personal Injury Court.

=== Ordinary cause ===
All cases heard at proof by the Personal Injury Court are heard under ordinary cause rules as defined by the Personal Injury Act of Sederunt of 2009 (as amended). Ordinary cause procedures are more complex than small claims or summary cause, and as such a solicitor will likely be required as legal documents will need to be drafted. A person can represent themselves as a litigant in person but many organisations including Shelter Scotland advise against it. Use of a lay representative is not permitted.

=== Jury trials ===
Under Section 63 of the Courts Reform (Scotland) Act 2014, a case lodged with the Personal Injury Court that proceeds to proof will take the form of a jury trial. The jury will consist of 12 people, and can decide a verdict by majority decision. If the pursuer and defender both agree, then the proof can take place before a sheriff sitting alone as a judge in summary proceedings.

The first jury trial to take place in the Personal Injury Court was in the case of Peter Allan v Plexus Corp (UK) Limited, where the defender had attempted to have the case taken under summary procedure. However, Sheriff Baird decided in August 2016 the case could, and should, be heard before a jury.

=== Use of counsel ===
There is no automatic right for a pursuer or defender to have an advocate instructed for the case: it is for the court to make such a determination. Section 108 of Courts Reform (Scotland) Act 2014 which requires any sheriff court (including the Sheriff Personal Injury Court) to grant sanction for the use of counsel where the court considers that the case is likely to be difficult or complex, or important or of requisite value. At the same time, no party should be allowed an advantage over an other through the use of an advocate.

==== Sanction granted ====
Use of counsel (advocate) was sanctioned by Sheriff Reith QC in the case of Sarah Dow v M & D Crolla Ltd, on 14 March 2016. Sheriff Reith QC granted sanction for counsel as the case was of significant importance to the pursuer. BTO Solicitors, on 23 March 2016, evaluated the implications of Dow v M & D Crolla and V on behalf of J v M & D (Leisure) Ltd identifying possible trends: Dow's claim was for an amount 3 times her annual salary, and J was acting on behalf of V, who was a child. As such, individual factors—as expressed in the 2014 Act—are not the deciding element, but it is the cumulative effect of various factors that will make sheriffs likely to grant sanction.

==== Sanction denied ====
In contrast, sanction was not granted in December 2016 for a personal injury case under summary cause. The case was heard at Livingston Sheriff Court by Sheriff Kinloch, and on that occasion the Sheriff denied sanction for the pursuer to instruct counsel. The pursuer, David Brown, had been informed that the defender, Aviva Insurance, was instructing counsel, and so sought to have sanction granted on the grounds of equality of arms. However, Sheriff Kinloch did not find that the case was complex, important, or of requisite value and therefore the pursuer was represented by a solicitor.

== Judges and office holders ==
The sheriffs appointed to hear cases in the Personal Injury Court are all sheriffs within the Sheriffdom of Lothian and Borders, and are appointed to the court by the Sheriff Principal of Lothian and Borders.

=== Personal injury sheriffs ===
Current judges of the Sheriff Personal Injury Court
Name
Sheriff Robert Fife
Sheriff Christopher Dickson
Sheriff John Mundy
Sheriff Douglas Keir
Sheriff Kenneth Campbell
