= Stipendiary magistrate =

Junior judge in British and other judiciaries

Stipendiary magistrates were magistrates that were paid for their work (they received a stipend). They existed in the judiciaries of the United Kingdom and those of several former British territories, presiding over the lowest-level criminal courts.

== United Kingdom ==
=== England and Wales ===
Stipendiary magistrates sat in the magistrates' courts of England and Wales, alongside unpaid 'lay' magistrates, generally hearing the more serious cases. In London, stipendiary magistrates were known as metropolitan stipendiary magistrates. Until 1949, they were known as metropolitan police magistrates. There was also a Chief Metropolitan Stipendiary Magistrate for London, with additional administrative duties.

In August 2000, stipendiary magistrates, including metropolitan stipendiary magistrates, were replaced by the new role of district judge (magistrates' courts). In the modern criminal court, district judges and magistrates possess equal powers. There is also now a Senior District Judge (Chief Magistrate).

Manchester Stipendiary Magistrate Act 1813
- Act of Parliament
- Parliament of the United Kingdom
- Long title: An Act for the more effectual Administration of the Office of a Justice of the Peace within the Townships of Manchester and Salford, in the Hundred of Salford, in the County Palatine of Lancaster; and to provide by Means of a Rate on the said Townships and otherwise, a competent Salary to a Justice of the Peace acting within the said Townships; and to enable the Constables of Manchester and Salford to take Recognizances in certain cases.
- Citation: 53 Geo. 3. c. 72
- Territorial extent: United Kingdom

Dates
- Royal assent: 22 June 1813
- Commencement: 22 June 1813 (Note: The Acts of Parliament (Commencement) Act 1793.)
- Repealed: 2 June 1854
Other legislation
Repealed by	Manchester Division Stipendiary Justice Act 1854

Status: Repealed

Text of statute as originally enacted

Merthyr Tydfil Justices of the Peace Act 1843
- Act of Parliament
- Parliament of the United Kingdom
- Long title: An Act to provide for the more effectual Execution of the Office of a Justice of the Peace within the Parish of Merthyr Tidvil, and certain adjoining Parishes.
- Citation: 6 & 7 Vict. c. xliv
- Territorial extent: United Kingdom

Dates
- Royal assent: 27 June 1843
- Commencement: 27 June 1843
- Repealed: 2 June 1987
Other legislation
Amended by	Administration of Justice Act 1964; Justices of the Peace Act 1968
Repealed by	Mid Glamorgan County Council Act 1987

Status: Repealed

Chatham and Sheerness Stipendiary Magistrate Act 1867 (Note: Section 1.)
- Act of Parliament
- Parliament of the United Kingdom
- Long title: An Act for the Appointment of a Stipendiary Magistrate for Chatham and Sheerness in the County of Kent.
- Citation: 30 & 31 Vict. c. 63
- Territorial extent: United Kingdom

Dates
- Royal assent: 25 July 1867
- Commencement: 25 July 1867
- Repealed: 24 March 1952 (Note: The Justices of the Peace Act 1949 (Commencement No. 4) Order 1952 (SI 1952/462).)
Other legislation
Amended by	Metropolitan Police Courts Act 1897
Repealed by	Justices of the Peace Act 1949

Status: Repealed

Text of statute as originally enacted

Pontypridd Stipendiary Magistrate's Act 1872
- Act of Parliament
- Parliament of the United Kingdom
- Long title: An Act for the appointment of a Stipendiary Magistrate for the Petty Sessional Division of Pontypridd in the county of Glamorgan; and for other purposes.
- Citation: 35 & 36 Vict. c. xiv
- Territorial extent: United Kingdom

Dates
- Royal assent: 13 May 1872
- Commencement: 13 May 1872
- Repealed: 4 August 1920
Other legislation
Repealed by	Pontypridd Stipendiary Magistrate Act 1920

Status: Repealed

Text of statute as originally enacted

South Staffordshire Stipendiary Justice Act 1899
- Act of Parliament
- Parliament of the United Kingdom
- Long title: An Act to make provision for the more effectual execution of the office of Justice of the Peace in South Staffordshire.
- Citation: 62 & 63 Vict. c. xc
- Territorial extent: United Kingdom

Dates
- Royal assent: 13 July 1899
- Commencement: 29 September 1899 (Note: Section 2.)
- Repealed: 1 April 1969 (Note: The Justices of the Peace Act 1968 (Commencement No. 2) Order 1969 (SI 1969/376).)
Other legislation
Repealed by	Justices of the Peace Act 1949; House of Commons Disqualification Act 1957; Criminal Justice Administration Act 1962; Justices of the Peace Act 1968

Status: Repealed

Text of statute as originally enacted

Stipendiary magistrates were appointed for:

- Manchester and Salford by the Manchester Stipendiary Magistrate (53 Geo. 3. c. 72).
- The Staffordshire Potteries by the Staffordshire Potteries Stipendiary Justice Act 1839 (2 & 3 Vict. c. 15)
- Merthyr Tydfil by the Merthyr Tydfil Justices of the Peace Act 1843 (6 & 7 Vict. c. xliv)
- Chatham and Sheerness in Kent by the Chatham and Sheerness Stipendiary Magistrate Act 1867 (30 & 31 Vict. c. 63)
- Pontypridd by the Pontypridd Stipendiary Magistrate's Act 1872 (35 & 36 Vict. c. xiv)
- Wolverhampton by the South Staffordshire Stipendiary Justice Act 1899 (62 & 63 Vict. c. xc)

=== Scotland ===
Stipendiary magistrates were the most junior judges in the Scottish judiciary. The Courts Reform (Scotland) Act 2014, passed by the Scottish Parliament, abolished the post with the creation of the new post of summary sheriff.

In 2014 there were only 4.9 full-time equivalent posts and the only court they sat in was the Justice of the Peace Court in Glasgow. The intention is that there will be a larger number of summary sheriffs, with around 60 of them sitting in more justice of the peace courts and sheriff courts, throughout the country. Under the act any stipendiary magistrates in post on implementation of the legislation became summary sheriffs and transferred unless they declined appointment.

Summary sheriffs are able to sit in justice of the peace courts and sheriff courts. In justice of the peace courts they can exercise the same summary criminal powers as a justice of the peace. However, when they sit in a sheriff court they will exercise the same powers as a sheriff in relation to summary criminal business.

==== Duties ====
All six sheriffs principal had the power to appoint stipendiary magistrates but the power had only been used in the Sheriffdom of Glasgow and Strathkelvin.

Stipendiary magistrates exercised the same powers as a sheriff (judge) when dealing with summary criminal cases. Like sheriffs, stipendiary magistrates wore wig and gown in court.

Stipendiary magistrates were approved solicitors or advocates, and they handled similar summary cases as sheriffs, for example drink driving, dangerous driving and assault cases. They could impose sentences of up to one year's imprisonment and fines of up to £10,000.

== British Caribbean ==
The colonies of the British Caribbean had stipendiary magistrates appointed when the Slavery Abolition Act 1833 came into force in 1834. The provisions of the act needed to be enforced, but the existing magistrates in the colonies were all either plantation owners or managers, or closely associated with that class. Independent justices of the peace were needed to adjudicate the fair implementation of the act. These involved disputes between former slaves (who now had to serve as apprentices) and their former owners. The act stipulated that the apprentices should carry out 45 hours of work a week, have appropriate allowances of food and clothing, and receive medical care. The apprentices had the right to buy out their service obligations at a fair price, and a request to do this could not be refused.

A limited (and insufficient) number of stipendiary magistrates were appointed and assigned across the various colonies. Each had a large territory to cover and so incurred significant expenses (for instance, requiring two horses for the extensive travelling that was required. The colonial governors had to intervene to ensure that an adequate expense allowance was provided.

== Canada ==
Stipendiary magistrates were the initial trial judges in the North-West Territories of Canada. They were replaced by the Supreme Court of the North-West Territories in 1886. Stipendiary magistrates also existed in the past in British Columbia.

== Other jurisdictions ==
Stipendiary magistrates have also existed in the judiciary of Australia and the judiciary of New Zealand.

The post was abolished in New Zealand in 1980 when it was renamed to district court judge.

== See also ==
- Byfoged, a similar position in Denmark and Norway
