= Drunk driving law by country =

The laws of driving under the influence vary between countries. One difference is the acceptable limit of blood alcohol content. For example, the legal BAC for driving in Bahrain is 0, despite drinking alcohol being allowed, in practice meaning that any alcohol level beyond the limit of detection will result in penalties. Penalties vary and may include fines, imprisonment, suspension of one's driver's license, vehicle impoundment or seizure, and mandatory training or education.

== Countries without legal limit ==
According to WHO data from 2018, the following countries had no legal limit for drinking and driving: Antigua and Barbuda, Barbados, Burundi, Comoros, Gambia, Grenada, Guatemala, Guinea-Bissau, Liberia, Marshall Islands, Niger, Saint Vincent and the Grenadines, Sao Tome and Principe, Senegal, Sierra Leone, South Sudan, Syrian Arab Republic and Togo.

== Countries with total bans for all people ==
According to WHO data from 2018, the following countries had total bans of alcohol for all types of drivers (Young/novice drivers, commercial drivers): Afghanistan, Maldives, Mauritania, Saudi Arabia, Somalia, Sudan, Yemen.

== Africa ==
The following is a list of the legal blood alcohol content (BAC) limits for drivers in each African country:

- Angola: 0.06%
- Algeria: 0.02%
- Benin: 0.05%
- Cape Verde: 0.08%
- Central African Republic: 0.08%
- Comoros: 0
- Congo: 0.05%
- Egypt: 0.05%
- Equatorial Guinea: 0.05%
- Eritrea: 0.03% for commercial or professional drivers, 0.05% for all other drivers
- Ethiopia: 0.08
- The Gambia: No limit
- Ghana: 0.08%
- Guinea: 0.08%
- Guinea-Bissau: No limit
- Kenya: 0.08%
- Libya: 0
- Malawi: 0.08%
- Mauritius: 0.05%
- Morocco: 0.02%
- Namibia: 0.05%
- Niger: No limit
- Nigeria: 0.05%
- Rwanda: 0.08%
- Seychelles: 0.08%
- South Africa: 0.05%; 0.02% for professional drivers (trucks over 3.5 tonnes, and vehicles carrying passengers for reward)
- Togo: No limit
- Tunisia: 0.03%
- Uganda: 0.08%
- Tanzania: Zero for professional or commercial drivers, 0.08% for all other drivers
- Zambia: 0.08%

== Americas ==
=== North America ===
- Canada: 0.08%, or impaired based on observation (federal criminal offences). Many provinces have administrative penalties related to drunk driving, often for BAC exceeding 0.04% or 0.05%. Some provinces have zero-tolerance policies for new drivers undergoing graduated licensing, or drivers under the age of 22.
- Mexico: 0.04–0.10%
- United States: 0.04% for commercial drivers. For other drivers, 0.05% or 0.08%, depending on state.

=== Caribbean ===
- Bahamas: 0.08%
- Cuba: Zero tolerance for young or inexperienced drivers and professional or commercial drivers, 0.05% for all other drivers
- Dominican Republic: 0.05%
- Jamaica: 35 μg/100 mL alcohol in breath or 80 mg/100 mL alcohol in blood
- Trinidad and Tobago: 35 μg/(100 mL) BrAC, 80 mg/100 mL BAC
- Cayman Islands: 0.07% BAC (reduced from 0.10% in 2022)

=== Central America ===
- Belize: 0.08%
- Costa Rica: 0.02% for public transport, commercial drivers and new drivers, or 0.05% for all others. More results in a fine of CRC 280,000 (US$489.61 as of 27 July 2017). A BAC in excess of 0.05% for public transport, commercial drivers and new drivers or 0.075% for all others additionally results in a 1- to 3-year prison sentence, vehicle impoundment and 2-year licence suspension.
- El Salvador: Zero tolerance
- Guatemala: No limit
- Honduras: 0.07%
- Nicaragua: 0.05%
- Panama: 0.08%

=== South America ===
- Argentina: Zero tolerance adopted in 2023. The law applies on national roads, and 18 out of 24 provincial jurisdictions have adopted the limit of 0.0 g/l for provincial routes. As of February 2024, the provinces of CABA, Corrientes, Misiones, Mendoza, San Juan and Santa Fe retain the old limits (zero tolerance for public transport and commercial vehicles, 0.02% for motorcycles, and 0.05% for all others).
- Bolivia: 0.05% for professional drivers only
- Brazil: Since 2008 Brazil practices zero tolerance. If a driver is found to be driving with any BAC (up to 0.06%), the driver is to have their license suspended for 12 months, pay a fine of B$2,934.70 (doubled if recurrence) and will have the car seized. Anything above 0.06% is considered a criminal offense.
- Chile: From 15 March 2012, at 0.03–0.08% the driver is considered to be driving under the influence and carries a three-month suspension and a fine of US$82–410 (as of 19 March 2012); over 0.08% the driver is considered to be drunk and carries a prison term of 61 to 301 days, a fine of US$164–820 (as of 19 March 2012) and a two-year suspension for the first offense, a five-year suspension for a second offense, and a life suspension for a third offense.
- Colombia: Colombia is known to have the toughest penalties against those driving under the influence in all of Latin America and practice a zero tolerance policy on DUIs. If a driver is found to be driving with 20–39 mg/100 mL ethanol in blood (equivalent to 0.02–0.039% BAC), the driver is to have their license suspended for a year, pay a fine of US$914 (as of 22 December 2013), and serve twenty hours of community service. In the most extreme cases, if a driver is found to be driving with grade three alcohol (150 mg/100 mL ethanol in blood), the driver is to have their licence confiscated for ten years, pay a fine of US$7,314 (as of 22 December 2013), and serve fifty hours of community service. If the driver gets in a crash and causes injuries and/or deaths, the driver is to face between 2.5 and eighteen years of prison and their license will be cancelled permanently.
- Ecuador: 0.01% for commercial or professional drivers; 0.03% for all other drivers
- Guyana: 0.08%
- Paraguay: 0
- Peru: Drivers below a 0.05% BAC will be given a warning. At a 0.05% and over, the driver will be given a fine and a license suspension of no less than six months and no more than two years. If the driver is involved in a crash without causing death or severe injury to another individual, he or she may possibly face jail time. If the driver causes a crash with a BAC over 0.101%, involving death or severe injury to another party, he or she will receive a mandatory prison sentence of three to five years. The driver's license will also be permanently revoked.
- Suriname: 0.05%
- Uruguay: 0. The driver will have to pay a fine of US$448 (as of 29 June 2020) and will have their licence suspended. Depending on the concentration of alcohol in blood and the times the driver was found guilty, the suspension goes from a minimum of six months to a maximum of two years. If the driver causes a crash involving death, he or she will be charged with negligent homicide and will face a minimum of six months in prison.
- Venezuela: 0.08%

== Asia ==
=== Central Asia ===
- Mongolia: 0.05%
- Turkmenistan: 0.03%

=== East Asia ===
- Mainland China: 0.02%. Over 0.02% but under 0.08%: CN¥ 1,000–2,000 fine, six-month license suspension; Over 0.08%: up to three years' imprisonment, five-year license suspension. If the driver causes serious injuries or death, they will be charged with crime and the license will be permanently cancelled.
- Hong Kong: 0.05% or BrAC 0.22 mg/L or urine 0.067%. Driving under the influence of alcohol beyond legal limit is punishable with a monetary fine and up to three years' imprisonment, with ten driving-offense points and mandatory Driving Improvement Course.
- Japan: BrAC 0.15 mg/L (equivalent to 0.03%). Additionally, regardless of alcohol readings, police may also determine the driver to be "driving drunk", which is punished more severely than exceeding the designated alcohol limits. Effectively zero for drivers under 20 because of the legal drinking age.
- South Korea: The penalties were increased after public resentment towards lenient sentencing. Criticism of lenient sentencing has continued.
  - BAC 0.03%–0.08% : License suspension for 90 days and fine up to KRW 5,000,000(about USD $5,000).
  - BAC 0.08%–0.20%: License revocation for a year and fine up to KRW 10,000,000(about USD $10,000).
  - BAC over 0.2% or DUI caught 3 times: License revocation for indefinite period and imprisonment for up to 5 years and fine up to KRW 20,000,000(about USD $20,000).
  - Drunk driving crash resulting in death: 3 years minimum, up to life imprisonment.
- Taiwan: 0.03% (BrAC 0.15 mg/L). The fines vary depending on the vehicle being driven at the time of offence. Scooter and motorcycle drivers convicted of first time DUI offenses will be subject to a fine between NT$15,000 and NT$90,000. Other motorists can be fined between NT$30,000 and NT$120,000 for first-time DUI offenses, while second-time offenders are liable to a fine of NT$120,000. Cyclists and passengers of drunk drivers are also able to be penalised.

=== South Asia ===
- Afghanistan: 0. Alcohol is prohibited in Afghanistan, a Muslim theocracy.
- Bangladesh: 0
- India: 0.03%. This is according to section 185 of the Motor Vehicles Act 1988. On a first offence, the punishment is imprisonment of six months, a fine of 10,000 Indian Rupees (INR) or both. If the second offense is committed within three years, the punishment is two years, a fine of 15,000 Indian Rupees (INR) or both. The clause of 30 mg/dL was added by an amendment in 1994. It came into effect beginning 14 November 1994. Alcohol is prohibited in the states of Mizoram, Gujarat, Bihar and Nagaland, parts of Manipur, and the union territory of Lakshadweep.
- Nepal: 0. Breathalyzer testing is regularly used in major cities like Kathmandu, Pokhara, and Biratnagar, and highways. For more verification, driver will be taken to the nearest hospital for blood and urine test (if demanded by the driver). The license will be seized instantly. The driver will get their license back after attending anti-alcoholic classes run by Nepal Traffic Police and a NRS 1000 fine will be charged.
- Pakistan: Falls under drink and drugs, S. No 14. No set limit. Eight penalty points. Alcohol is prohibited for Muslims in Pakistan.
- Sri Lanka: 0.06%. Breathalyzer testing is not used routinely. If suspected by police the driver is produced before the closest government medical officer who examines and determines whether the driver is under influence. If the driver refuses examination by the medical officer, they are considered to have been under influence by default.

=== Southeast Asia ===
- Brunei: 35 micrograms of alcohol in 100 milliliters of breath or 80 milligrams of alcohol in 100 milliliters of blood.
- Cambodia: 0.05%
- Indonesia: 0
- Laos: 80 mg/100 mL of blood.
- Malaysia: 0.08%, or 80 mg/100 mL alcohol in blood. According to the Road Traffic (Amendment) Act of 2020, which took effect on 23 October 2020, the following are the alcohol limits imposed by amendment: 22 micrograms of alcohol in 100 milliliters of breath; 50 milligrams of alcohol in 100 milliliters of blood; 67 milligrams of alcohol in 100 milliliters of urine.
- Philippines: The Republic Act 10586 or the "Anti-Drunk and Drugged Driving Act of 2013" indicates that blood alcohol content (BAH) should be 0.05% for non-professional drivers and 0.01% for motorcycle riders and professional drivers. A traffic enforcer must first establish probable cause before directing a motorist suspected of DUI to pull over. Then, the motorist should do the following field sobriety tests—the horizontal gaze nystagmus (eye test), the walk-and-turn, and one-leg stand. A breath analyzer shall only be used after the motorist fails these three tests.
- Singapore: 0.03% (30 mg/100 mL alcohol blood) or BrAC: 15 μg/100 mL alcohol in breath, strictly enforced.
- Thailand: Zero for professional or commercial drivers, 0.05% for other drivers, except for 2 years license holder or who has no a driving license are limited at 0.02%.
- Vietnam: 0

=== Western Asia ===
- Armenia: 0.02% of pure alcohol in blood or 0.1 milligrams of alcohol per liter for exhaled air.
- Azerbaijan: 0
- Bahrain: 0
- Iran: Not applicable, alcohol is banned
- Iraq: 0.04%
- Israel: 0.024% 24 mg/100 mL alcohol in breath (penalties only apply above 29 mg/100 mL alcohol in breath due to lawsuits about sensitivity of devices used). New drivers, drivers under 24 years of age and commercial drivers 0.005% 5 mg/100 mL alcohol in breath.
- Jordan: 0.05. Breathalyzer testing is not routinely used. If suspected by police the driver is produced before the closest government medical officer who examines and determines whether the driver is under influence.
- Kuwait: Not applicable, alcohol is banned
- Lebanon: 0.02%, often unenforced
- Oman: 0.08%
- Qatar: 0
- Saudi Arabia: Not applicable, alcohol is banned
- Syria: often unenforced, unless heavily drunk and driving. License revoked for 1 to 3 months. £S 2,000 fine.
- Turkey: 0.05% for private car drivers, 0.02% for all others
- United Arab Emirates: 0
- Yemen: Not applicable, alcohol is banned

== Europe ==
Map of Europe showing countries' blood alcohol limits as defined in g/dl for the general population

'Zero' usually means below detection limit.

- Albania: 0.01%
- Andorra: 0.05%
- Austria: 0.05% 0.01% for drivers who have held a license for less than two years and drivers of vehicles over 7.5 tonnes.
- Belarus: 0.03%
- Belgium: 0.05% Fines and driving bans increase as the alcohol concentration in the blood increases. 0.02% for commercial drivers.
- Bosnia and Herzegovina: 0.03% for all drivers except for drivers of C, CE, D and DE categories, public service drivers, professional drivers, driving instructors, and drivers younger than 21 years or without 3 years of experience, where the limit is zero
- Bulgaria: 0.05%
- Croatia: 0.05%. Zero for drivers aged 18 to 24 and professional drivers on duty.
- Cyprus: 0.05% or 0.22 gram per liter.
- Northern Cyprus: 0.05%
- Czech Republic: Zero
- Denmark: 0.05% for all motor vehicles, but zero if not driving safely. For the first three years after getting your license however, the limit is 0.02%. The argument is that new drivers have less experience behind the wheel. For first time offenders, 0.05 to 0.12% results in a fine and conditional suspension of the drives license (has to retake the driver's license test and an alcohol-and-vehicles course). Between 0.12 and 0.20% results in a fine and three year complete suspension of the driver's license followed by a new driver's license test and an alcohol-and-vehicles course. Below 0.20%, the fine equals one month's pay after taxes × BAC × 10. Above 0.20%, the perpetrator receives a 20-day conditional prison sentence, a fine equal to one month's pay after taxes, the car usually is confiscated, and the driver's license is completely suspended for three years followed by a new driver's license test, an alcohol-and-vehicles course and a two-year period with a breath alcohol ignition interlock device. Regardless of alcohol level, the penalty significantly increases for repeat offenders. There are no exact limits for vehicles without a motor (e.g., bicycles), but if a person is regarded as being incapable of operating one safely it results in a fine.
- Estonia: 0.02%
- Finland: for motor vehicles, 0.05%, or 0.22 mg/1 L alcohol in breath, aggravated: 0.12% or 0.53 mg/1 L alcohol in breath. The penalty is a fine or jail up to six months plus license suspension from one month to five years. For aggravated, also a prison sentence (sixty days to two years) is possible, usually as a suspended sentence. For users of non-motor vehicles such as bicycles or light electric vehicles, there is no set blood alcohol limit, but endangerment caused by driving while intoxicated is punishable. Routine breath testing, without a probable cause, is permitted and often practiced.
- France: 0.05% or 0.02% for new drivers (under three years of driving license) and bus drivers (€135 fine and six demerit points on the driver's license, which can be suspended for three years maximum), 0.08% (aggravated, criminal offense, license suspension for three years, €4,500 fine, and up to two years' imprisonment)
- Georgia: 0.03%
- Germany: Zero for beginners (less than two years' experience or under the age of 21), professional drivers, bus drivers, truck drivers, and drivers transporting passengers commercially; 0.03% in conjunction with any other traffic offense or incident; 0.05% otherwise. For cyclists, the limit is set at 0.16%, where not in conjunction with any other traffic offense or incident. Starting at 0.16%, cyclists face the same penalties as they would for operating a motor vehicle.
  Penalties start at a €500 fine and one-month license suspension, fines are means tested based upon one's disposable income. From 0.11%, the penalty is means tested based upon one's disposable income but at minimum a €500 fine and the withdrawal of the driver's license for at least six months, but usually about one year and in some cases, the driving licence is revoked rather than withdrawn (this penalty is set by the court and revocation means a new licence needs to be applied for after the period instated by the court). In certain states (Berlin, Bavaria, Baden-Wurttemberg) a Medical Psychological Assessment (MPU) will be ordered from 0.11% in order to be reissued with a new licence after one's revocation period and this also optionally may be ordered (at the authority's discretion) in all other states; from 0.16%, reissue of the licence requires a successful MPU. From 0.11% within ten years of an offense from 0.05%, there is a minimum €1,000 fine and a one-year license withdrawal; the driver has to successfully pass an MPU and is required to prove to the court that they have been sober for the last twelve months, before they can get their licence back. For repeat offenses, the fine is multiplied by the ordinal of the offence (doubled, tripled, etc.), regardless of the amount by which the driver was over the limit. These minimum penalties are usually exceeded by the German courts. From 0.11%, the courts usually also require the DUI offender to do unpaid community service. Note that decisions on licence reinstatement after revocation do not lie with the court but with the local administrative office for driving licenses (Verkehrsamt).
- Gibraltar: 0.05%
- Greece: 0.05% (BrAC 0.25 mg/L), reduced to 0.02% (BrAC 0.10 mg/L) for unlicensed or new drivers who have held a license for less than two years, motorcycle and professional drivers. Above 0.11% (BrAC 0.60 mg/L) it's considered a flagrant misdemeanour punishable with up to two years of imprisonment and a hefty fine in the court plus the revoking of the driver's licence for six months. Routine breath testing without a probable cause is permitted and practised by the traffic police, especially on weekends and major holidays.
- Hungary: Absolute zero tolerance policy. BAC below 0.05% is graded as administrative traffic infraction, anything above that level constitutes a criminal offense.
- Iceland: 0.02%
- Republic of Ireland: 0.05% generally or 0.02% for learner drivers, newly qualified drivers (those who have their license for less than two years) and professional drivers, and those who do not have their driving license on them when stopped by the Gardaí. Police do not need a reason to request a breath sample. Being convicted of drunk driving usually carries a two-year ban as well as a €1,500 fine.
- Italy: 0.05%, zero for drivers with less than three years' experience and professional drivers (bus, trucks, etc.). Increased penalties for over 0.08% and over 0.15%. License is always revoked in case of: professional drivers, second offence committed within two years or in case of a crash. If the driver refuses examination he is considered to have been under influence by default applying the over 0.15% rules. Routine breath testing without probable cause is permitted and practiced by various law enforcement agencies.
- Latvia: 0.02% for drivers with less than two years of experience and 0.05% for those with more than two years of experience.
- Liechtenstein: 0.08%
- Lithuania: Zero for taxi, truck, bus, motorcycle drivers, drivers with less than two years of experience and 0.04% for those with more than two years of experience
- Luxembourg: 0.02% for professional drivers and drivers with less than two years of experience and 0.05% for the rest (€145 fine and two demerit points on the driving licence if caught). 0.08% earns drivers a citation, 0.12% means loss of license (since 1 October 2007)
- Malta: 0.05% for most drivers, 0.02% for commercial vehicle drivers and new drivers, and zero tolerance for drivers of taxis, buses, and other vehicles carrying passengers. The law was updated in 2017.
- Moldova: 0.03%
- Montenegro: 0.03%
- Netherlands: 220 μg/L BrAC, 0.5 mg/mL BAC or 88 μg BrAC, 0.2 mg/mL BAC for drivers with less than five years' experience (or less than seven years' experience when the driver got his/her license before reaching the age of eighteen). In addition to other measures, educational or rehabilitation courses can be required when these limits are exceeded by a driver. The LEMA (Light Educational Measure Alcohol and traffic) consists of two half-days of 3.5 hours each. LEMA is intended for drivers with a BAC between 0.8‰ and 1.0‰ (between 0.5‰ and 0.8‰ for novice drivers). In the Netherlands, the legal limit for this group of drivers is 0.2‰. The course is compulsory; if refused (or when not participating in a sufficiently engaged manner), the driving licence is declared invalid. The offender must pay the course fee of €134, in addition to other fees totaling €818 (CBR: 2025). The EMA (Educational Measure Alcohol and traffic) is a two-day course (one full day and two half-days) given to people who participated in traffic with a blood alcohol concentration (BAC) between 1.0‰ and 1.3‰ (between 0.8‰ and 1.0‰ for novice drivers). EMA is compulsory: if the offender does not participate (or not actively enough), the driving licence is suspended. In addition, the offender must pay the course fee of €464, in addition to other fees totaling €1.196 (CBR: 2025).
  Penalization can come in the form of fines, community service, temporary driving restrictions, as well as complete revocation of the driving licence.
- North Macedonia: Zero for professional drivers, public service drivers, commercial transport and beginner drivers, 0.05% for all others
- Norway: 0.02%. Punishment depends on the alcohol level. 0.02% (fine, but one may also risk a suspended licence if any aggravated circumstances are present.), 0.05% (fine, suspended sentence and suspended license), 0.1% (fine, suspended or mandatory sentence and suspended license), 0.15% (fine, mandatory sentence and suspended license). The guidelines state that the fine for an alcohol level of more than 0.05% should be around 1.5 months base salary and usually not lower than 10,000 NOK. For 0.02% to 0.05% the fine is lower. Prison sentences are usually around three weeks to three months with a maximum of one year. The suspension period varies from less than a year to forever, when license is suspended forever, one may apply to get it back after five years.
- Poland: 0.02%. 0.02% to 0.05% is a misdemeanour, punishable by fine and 10 penalty points, suspended sentence of up to 30 days of jail and possible driving license suspension for up to 3 years). (Above 0.05% is a crime, punishable by fine and 10, jail sentence up to 3 years, possible driving license suspension from 3 years up, above 0.15% your car is also confiscated). Intoxication is also considered an aggravated circumstance in case of a crash, resulting in a more severe punishment.
- Portugal: 0.05% is standard, 0.02% for drivers with less than three years of experience, emergency vehicle drivers, children transportation, drivers younger than 16, taxi drivers, drivers of C, CE, D, DE categories, hazardous material transport drivers and TVDE (Transport of Passengers in Unmarked Vehicles by Electronic Platform Operators). Below 0.05% constitutes a fine of €250 up to €1250 and it may occur in inhibition of driving from 1 month up to 1 year. From 0.05% above it will incur in a fine from €500 up to €2500 and a driving inhibition from 2 months up to 2 years. After 0.12% it is considered a crime. For all other drivers, from 0.05% but below 0.08% incurs in a fine from €250 to €1250 and the 1 month to 1 year inhibition, while from 0.08% to below 0.12% incurs in a fine from €500 to €2500 with the 2 months to 2 years inhibition. 0.12% and above is also a crime for these drivers
- Romania: Zero tolerance. Below 0.40% mg/L alcohol BAC in exhaled air results in highest-category (expensive) civil penalty (between 3,045 RON - 7,250 RON, equivalent of ~630 EUR - 1500 EUR) and suspended license for 3 months. Above 0.40% mg/L BAC in exhaled air results in pursuing criminal action (with or without temporary incarceration, upon circumstances), which most often leads to imprisonment between 1 and 5 years or criminal fine in best cases.
- Russian Federation: 0.0356% since 1 September 2013, previously zero since 2010
- Serbia: 0.02% for all, zero for motorcycle drivers, professional drivers, public service drivers, commercial transport and beginning drivers
- Slovakia: The law is zero. But the police will not prosecute a BAC below 0.03% or a BrAC below 0.15 mg/l.
- Slovenia: Zero for drivers with three years' experience or less and professional drivers, 0.05% (0.24 mg/L) for all others The driver's license of those who reject the sobriety test may be revoked permanently, and their revocation stays in records indefinitely.
- Spain: 0.05% BAC (0.25 mg/L BrAC) and 0.03% BAC (0.15 mg/L BrAC) for drivers with less than two years' experience and drivers of freight vehicles over 3.5 tonnes, and of passenger vehicles with more than nine seats. Zero tolerance for drivers under 18. Surpassing the limit is a serious offense, fined with €500. Driving with an alcohol rate over 0.12% is a crime (up to six months' imprisonment and license suspension up to one year).
- Sweden: 0.02%. Above 0.1% is considered aggravated. Annually about 2.5 million random tests are performed for alcohol and about twelve thousand tests on suspicion of drugs.
- Switzerland: 0.05%. 0.01% for drivers with less than three years' experience and commercial drivers.
- Ukraine: 0.02%
- United Kingdom
  - England and Wales and Northern Ireland: 80 mg/100 mL (~0.08% BAC) alcohol in blood, 35 μg/100 mL alcohol in breath or 107 mg/100 mL alcohol in urine.
  - Scotland: 50 mg/100 mL (~0.05% BAC) alcohol in blood or 22 μg/100 mL alcohol in breath (legislation became effective from 5 December 2014)

=== United Kingdom ===
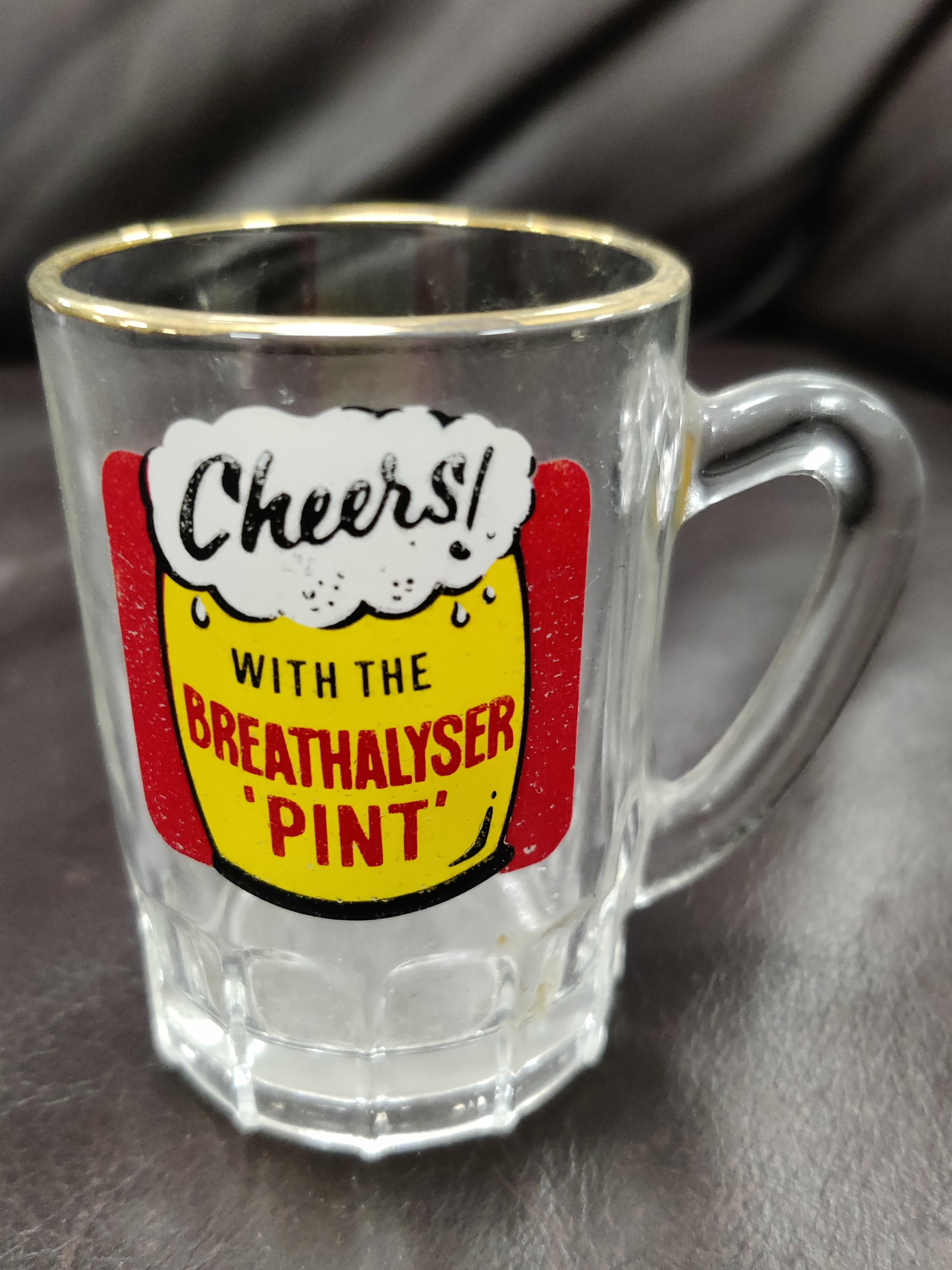
Novelty "Breathalyser 'pint'" beer glass, about 2 inches tall, dating from around the time of the introduction of breathalysers in the United Kingdom, in 1967

In Britain the practice is called "drink driving". There are two groups of offence: driving (or attempting to drive) and being in charge. The definition of "in charge" depends on such things as being in or near the vehicle, and having access to a means of starting the vehicle's engine and driving it away (i.e., the keys to a vehicle). Someone over the limit in a passenger seat can also be prosecuted if the police believe they had been driving or are able to show that there was a likelihood of them driving. This offence requires an objective measurement of fitness (or otherwise) to drive and is not often prosecuted. All offences of drink driving are created by the Road Traffic Act 1988 and, in Northern Ireland, the Road Traffic (Northern Ireland) Order 1995; the two enactments are broadly similar. There are additionally offences of cycling while under the influence of drink or drugs (Road Traffic Act 1960 s. 11: "to such an extent as to be incapable of having proper control of [the bicycle]") and being drunk in charge of a "carriage, horse, cattle, or steam engine" (Licensing Act 1872 s. 12, which also prohibits being drunk in possession of a loaded firearm).

There are also "prescribed limit" offences of driving, or being in charge of, a motor vehicle with excess alcohol in the body above the prescribed limit. In England and Wales, and in Northern Ireland, the prescribed limit is 35 micrograms of alcohol per 100 millilitres of expired alveolar breath (or 80 milligrams of alcohol per 100 millilitres of blood): in Scotland, the prescribed limit is 22 micrograms of alcohol per 100 millilitres of expired alveolar breath (or 50 milligrams of alcohol per 100 millilitres of blood).

It is an offence to refuse to provide a specimen of breath, blood or urine for analysis. The penalties for refusing are the same as those for actual drink driving, except when the sample was demanded some time after the suspected drink driving (e.g. at a police station), in which case the penalties are lower. The request to take a screening breath test must be made by a police officer in uniform, but can only be made if one of the following situations apply:

1. the police officer has reasonable cause to suspect that the driver has committed, or is committing, a moving traffic offence, or
2. if, having stopped, an officer has reasonable cause to suspect that the person driving/attempting to drive/in charge of the vehicle has consumed alcohol, or
3. the police officer has reasonable cause to believe that the person is or was driving/attempting to drive/in charge of a motor vehicle when it was involved in an accident.

There are no specific defences to drink driving (general defences such as duress or automatism may apply in certain rare circumstances). However, it may be possible to argue that special reasons exist which are such that the offender should not be disqualified from driving despite having committed the offence. Special reasons are notoriously difficult to establish, and the burden of proof is always upon the accused to establish them. Such reasons may include:

- shortness of distance driven
- unintentional commission of the offence (e.g., laced drinks)
- emergencies

The prosecutor has discretion not to charge any offence if they consider it not to be in the public interest to do so (e.g. if the offender unintentionally committed the offence as a result of being a victim of crime, such as spiking).

==== Mode of trial and sentence ====
Mode of trial and sentencing for drink driving offences are set out in Schedule 2 of the Road Traffic Offenders Act 1988 and, in Northern Ireland, Schedule 1 of the Road Traffic Offenders (Northern Ireland) Order 1996, which has similar provisions. Nearly all are summary, meaning they can only be tried without a jury, by a magistrates' court (before a panel of three lay magistrates or lone district judge) or, in Scotland, a justice of the peace court or sheriff court under summary proceedings. The exception is causing death by careless driving while under the influence of drink or drugs, which is triable only on indictment, meaning it can only be tried by jury, in the Crown Court or, in Scotland, by the sheriff court or High Court under solemn proceedings. Some offences that can be committed by a drunk driver that do not specifically involve drink, such as dangerous driving and causing serious injury by careless driving, are either way offences, triable either summarily or on indictment, largely depending on seriousness.

The courts in Great Britain are required to take account of sentencing guidelines set by the Sentencing Council (for England and Wales) and the Scottish Sentencing Council within the limits set by law. There are no sentencing guidelines in Northern Ireland.

Driving or attempting to drive while above the legal limit of 0.08% BAC in England, Wales and Northern Ireland, and 0.05% BAC in Scotland, or while unfit through drink carries a maximum penalty of six months' imprisonment, an unlimited fine and a minimum twelve months' disqualification. For a second offence committed within ten years of conviction, the minimum ban is three years. Being in charge of a vehicle while over the legal limit or unfit through drink could result in three months' imprisonment plus a fine of up to £2,500 and a driving ban. Causing death by careless driving when under the influence of drink or drugs carries a maximum penalty of life in prison, an unlimited fine, a minimum two-year driving ban, and a requirement to pass an extended driving test before the offender is able to drive legally again. In theory, the fine is means-tested and based on disposable income. A person must be disqualified from driving post-conviction for drink driving for a minimum of 12 months, and will usually receive a fine or imprisonment.

== Oceania ==
=== Australia ===
- Australia: 0.05% BAC

Road laws are state or territory based, but all states and territories have set similar rules. In particular, alcohol must never exceed 0.05g of alcohol in every 100ml of blood; limits for certain categories of drivers are lower, differing in different states.

Australian laws allow police officers to stop any driver and perform a random breath test or drug test without reason. Roadblocks can be set up just about anywhere (for example, leading out of town centres on Friday and Saturday nights and after football matches or other major events), where every single driver may be randomly breath-tested. People found to have excessive alcohol or any banned substances are taken to a police station for further analysis. Those over 0.08% will receive an automatic disqualification of their licence and must appear in court. This differs from UK and US laws where police generally need a reason to suspect that the driver is intoxicated before requesting a breath or sobriety test. It is an offence in Australia to refuse to provide a sample of breath when required to, with severe penalties, including prison.

==== Australian Capital Territory ====
- Zero for drivers or riders holding a learners, provisional, restricted or probationary licence and for drivers operating heavy vehicles over 15t GVM or driving a public vehicle for hire or reward (for example taxi and bus drivers)
- 0.05% for all other drivers

==== New South Wales ====
- Zero for learner and provisional licences
- 0.02% for drivers of vehicles of "gross vehicle mass" greater than 13.9 tonnes, vehicles carrying dangerous goods or public vehicles such as a taxi or bus
- 0.05% for all other drivers

==== Northern Territory ====
- Zero for provisional (probationary) license holders and all motorcyclists
- 0.05% for all other drivers

==== Queensland ====
- Zero for the drivers of trucks, buses, articulated vehicles, vehicles carrying dangerous goods, pilot vehicles, taxis, all learner drivers and provisional drivers and RE class licensed motorcyclists in their first twelve months.
- 0.05% for other drivers

==== South Australia ====
- Zero for learner, provisional, probationary, heavy (greater than fifteen tonnes) vehicle, taxis, licensed chauffeured vehicles, dangerous goods, and bus licenses.
- 0.05% for all other drivers

==== Tasmania ====
- Zero for learner, provisional, truck, bus, and taxi licences
- 0.05% for all other drivers

==== Victoria ====
- Zero for unlicensed drivers, holders of learner permits and probationary licences, "professional" drivers, and certain relicensed drunk-drivers.
- 0.05% for all other drivers.

There are also other restrictions for drivers in Victoria:

- Limits apply within three hours of driving - that is, police can require a person to submit to an alcohol or drugs test within three hours of driving and it is an offence to fail that test, unless the drug or alcohol use occurred after driving (see Road Safety Act 1986, ss. 49, 53 and 55E).
- Licences cancelled for certain serious drink-driving offences may only be reissued after obtaining a court order. This is the case for repeat offenders, and first offenders above 0.15%. In such cases, the relicensed driver is subject to a zero tolerance limit for three years following relicensing, or for as long as the person is required to use an alcohol interlock.
- Alcohol interlocks must be imposed whenever a repeat drunk-driver is relicensed.
- A court also has discretion to impose an alcohol interlock when relicensing a first offender in certain serious cases, generally when the offence involves a BAC by mass of 0.15% or higher.
- The law requires interlocks to be used for certain minimum periods, but the requirement to use an interlock does not automatically end at the completion of the minimum period. Once that period has expired, an individual may apply to a court to have the interlock condition removed from their driver's licence. The State Police must be given notice of the application and may make submissions to the court on whether the interlock condition should be removed. The court will also take into account data recorded by the interlock itself (e.g., whether any attempts were made to start the vehicle by a person who had been drinking).
- Driving without an interlock when one is required carries severe penalties, including imprisonment.
- If a doctor treats any patient not under fifteen years of age as a result of a motor vehicle crash, the patient must allow the doctor to take a blood sample for testing for alcohol and drug content in a way that preserves the chain of evidence. If this process is skipped the doctor may not be able to discover the alcohol blood level. The results can be used as evidence in subsequent court proceedings.
- The law allows a police officer to require any driver (or any person who has driven a vehicle within the last three hours) to perform a random saliva test for methamphetamine, cannabis and MDMA, all of which are subject to a zero limit (per Road Safety Act 1986: ss. 49, 55E & 55D)

==== Western Australia ====
- Zero for learner and probationary licence-holders and persons convicted of driving under the influence or failing to comply with a request for breath, blood or urine (for three years after the offense).
- 0.05% for all other drivers.

Driving with 0.15% BAC by mass and above (legally defined as Drunk Driving) is a distinct offence from having over 0.08% but under 0.15% BAC, and is subject to heavier penalties. Persistent offenders may be barred from driving for terms up to and including life, and may be imprisoned.

The law allows a police officer to require any driver to perform a random saliva test for methamphetamine, cannabis or MDMA, all of which are subject to a zero limit.

=== New Zealand ===
New Zealand operates a program called Compulsory Breath Testing, which allows police to stop motorists at any time without having any reason to do so. CBT is carried out at roadside checkpoints and by mobile patrols. The police also carry out roadside drug tests upon motorists they suspect have used drugs.

The system in New Zealand is age-based. The limits are:

- Zero for people under twenty years
- 0.05% BAC or 250 μg/L breath for people twenty years and over

The penalties for exceeding the limits are:

- People under twenty years, up to 0.03% BAC, 150 μg/L breath: instant NZ$200 fine and fifty demerit points
- People under twenty years, 0.03–0.08% BAC, 150–400 μg/L breath: up to three months' imprisonment, up to NZ$2,250 fine or both. Loss of license for three months or more.
- People twenty years and over, 0.051–0.08% BAC, 251–400 μg/L breath: instant NZ$500 fine and fifty demerit points. Twelve-hour prohibition from driving immediately after roadside test results in EBA above 250.
- All people over 0.08% BAC, 400 μg/L breath (first and second offenses): up to three months' imprisonment, up to NZ$4,500 fine or both; loss of license for six months or more
- All people over 0.08% BAC, 400 μg/L breath (third and subsequent offenses): two years' imprisonment; NZ$6,000 fine; loss of license for one year or more

Drivers convicted of excess breath alcohol may be required to gain a zero-limit license.

Note that penalties apply to the lowest reading taken across both breath and blood tests. For example, if a driver twenty years or over has a breath test result of 426 μg/L but a subsequent blood test returns 0.077% BAC, then the driver is not charged with any drink driving offense despite the breath reading being over the breath alcohol limit. The penalty for injuring or killing someone when under the influences is the same as dangerous driving (up to ten years' imprisonment, up to NZ$20,000 or both, and loss of license for one year or more).

=== Other countries in Oceania ===
- French Polynesia: 0.05%
- Micronesia: 0.05%
- Fiji: 0.08% general population, zero tolerance for novice and professional drivers
- Palau: Zero for new or inexperienced drivers and commercial or professional drivers, 0.10% for all other drivers

== See also ==
- DWI court
- Expungement
- Ignition interlock device, alternative to revoked license in some countries
- Legal drinking age
- Sobriety checkpoints
