= High Court of Constabulary =

- Royal Coat of Arms of the United Kingdom as used by the Courts in Scotland
- Established: 13th century
- Jurisdiction: Within 4 miles of the official residence of the Monarch, Privy Council, and Parliament of Scotland
- Composition method: Deputes appointed by Lord High Constable of Scotland

Lord High Constable of Scotland

The High Court of Constabulary was a court in Scotland presided over by the Lord High Constable of Scotland and other judges known as Constables-depute. The court had exclusive jurisdiction over crimes of rioting, disorder, bloodshed, and murder that took place within 4 miles (6.4 km) of the Monarch of Scotland, Privy Council of Scotland, or the Parliament of Scotland. It was established in the 13th century, and its de jure jurisdiction continued until at least the 19th century. From the 16th century the Constables-depute appear to have been the Lord Provosts, bailies, and Sheriffs of Edinburgh. Following the Treaty of Union of 1707, the Court had jurisdiction when the Monarch of Great Britain, and later the Monarch of the United Kingdom, was resident at the Palace of Holyrood House.

== History ==
Much of the history belonging to the High Court of Constabulary comes from records kept by the Earls of Erroll, who hold the position of Lord High Constable as a hereditary right. However, the burgh magistrates (the Lord Provost and bailies) of Edinburgh appear to have objected to the jurisdiction of the Constabulary Court, and from the 16th century it appears that the Earls of Erroll appointed the burgh magistrates as Constables-depute. The Lord High Constable continued to claim his jurisdiction into the 19th century, and from then the Sheriff of Edinburgh and the burgh magistrates of Edinburgh were appointed as Constables-depute whenever the Monarch of the United Kingdom was resident at the Palace of Holyroodhouse.

== Remit and jurisdiction ==
Established in the late 13th century the court was empowered to judge all cases of rioting, disorder, bloodshed, and murder if such crimes occurred within four miles of the King of Scots, the King's Council, or the Parliament of Scotland. Following James VI's move to England, the jurisdiction of the Lord High Constable was defined in terms of the "resident place" appointed for the Council.
