= Sheriff principal =

Scottish judge

In Scotland a sheriff principal (pl. sheriffs principal) (Scottish Gaelic: àrd-siorram) is a judge in charge of a sheriffdom with judicial, quasi-judicial, and administrative responsibilities. Sheriffs principal have been part of the judiciary of Scotland since the 11th century. Sheriffs principal were originally appointed by the monarch of Scotland, and evolved into a heritable jurisdiction before appointment was again vested in the Crown and the monarch of the United Kingdom following the passage of the Heritable Jurisdictions (Scotland) Act 1746.

Under the Sheriff Courts (Scotland) Act 1971 (as amended), each sheriff principal is appointed by the monarch of the United Kingdom on the advice of the First Minister of Scotland, who is advised by the Judicial Appointments Board for Scotland. As of May 2017 there were six sheriffs principal, each of whom has responsibility not only as a judge, but for the administration of justice in their respective sheriffdoms. Sheriffs principal have to ensure the effective running of the sheriff courts and justice of the peace courts within their jurisdiction. Following the passage of both the Courts Reform (Scotland) Act 2014 and the Judiciary and Courts (Scotland) Act 2008, sheriffs principal are subject to the authority and direction of the Lord President of the Court of Session as Head of the Judiciary of Scotland.

Sheriffs principal hold additional judicial offices, including the Sheriff Principal of Lothian and Borders who is Sheriff in Chancery, and President of the Sheriff Personal Injury Court. All of the sheriffs principal are Appeal Sheriffs and ex officio members of the Sheriff Appeal Court.

Outside their judicial office, each sheriff principal holds several other offices ex officio, including Commissioner of Northern Lighthouses and General Commissioner of Income Tax, with each sheriff principal having a ceremonial role in their respective sheriffdom that means they outrank all but members of the royal family and the Lord Lieutenant.

The history of the sheriffs principal in Scotland is much confused because over time different names were used to refer to sheriffs. Sheriffs principal are those sheriffs who have held office over a sheriffdom, whether through inheritance or through direct appointment by the Crown. Thus, hereditary sheriff (before 1746) and sheriff-depute (after 1746) are the precursors to the modern office of sheriff principal. The precursor to the modern office of sheriff was historically referred to as sheriff substitute.

== History ==
=== Origins ===
David I, King of Scots from 1124 to 1153, appointed sheriffs as administrators and judges throughout Scotland. Such officers eventually became hereditary with a sheriff-depute appointed to undertake the actual judicial work of the office. It is from these sheriffs that the modern day office of sheriffs principal derives, with a final settlement on the name by the Sheriff Courts (Scotland) Act 1971. The modern day office of sheriff derives from the sheriffs-substitute that were appointed by the sheriffs-depute (now sheriffs principal.)

=== 16th century ===
In 1540 an Act of the Parliament of Scotland mandated that sheriffs principal (along with bailies and stewards) should "hold all their three head courts by themselves in proper person, unless they have a just and lawful excuse". However, in the 16th century it appears that sheriffs-depute held office entirely at the will of the sheriffs principal, and undertook the vast majority of judicial work.

=== 17th century ===
In the 17th century, under the reign of Charles II, the number of heritable sheriffs principal increased in recognition of his restoration to the throne. By 1700, 21 of the 33 sheriffs principal were hereditary.

=== 18th century ===
In the 18th century, the office of hereditary sheriff principal was abolished by the Heritable Jurisdictions (Scotland) Act 1746, with the sheriffs-depute assuming the role and office of sheriff principal.

=== 19th century ===
Until about the middle of the 19th century there were 30 sheriffs principal. Of those sheriffs principal two (Glasgow and Edinburgh) were effectively full-time appointments while the remainder were part-time appointments filled by senior advocates, who are members of the Faculty of Advocates. Over the years there was a gradual amalgamation of sheriffdoms, with a consequential diminution in the number of sheriffs principal.

=== 20th century ===
In the 20th century the sheriff principal had appellate jurisdiction over summary causes in civil cases, with only cases that went to a full proof (hearing) having a right of appeal to both the sheriff principal and the Court of Session.

In 1971, the Sheriff Courts (Scotland) Act 1971 confirmed the naming of sheriffs principal (affirming that the office of sheriff depute should be known as sheriff principal), and that sheriffs-substitute should be known as sheriff, stating:

4 Offices of sheriff principal and sheriff
(1) The office of sheriff (that is to say, the office known formerly as the office of sheriff depute, but known immediately before the commencement of this Act as the office of sheriff) shall be known as the office of sheriff principal, the office of sheriff substitute shall be known as the office of sheriff, and the office of honorary sheriff substitute shall be known as the office of honorary sheriff. — Sheriff Courts (Scotland) Act 1971

The number of sheriffdoms was reduced to six in 1975 by the Sheriffdoms Reorganisation Order 1974, with all the prior sheriffdoms abolished and replaced by the following sheriffdoms:

- Grampian, Highlands and Islands;
- Tayside, Central and Fife;
- Lothian and Borders;
- Glasgow and Strathkelvin;
- North Strathclyde;
- South Strathclyde, Dumfries and Galloway;

with each sheriffdom presided over by a single sheriff principal.

The sheriffdom boundaries were amended and the sheriffdoms redescribed by the Sheriffdoms (Alteration of Boundaries) Order 1996, which replaced the 1974 order. The only change to the boundaries was to move an area around Chryston from the sheriffdom of Glasgow and Strathkelvin to the sheriffdom of South Strathclyde, Dumfries and Galloway.

== Remit and jurisdiction ==
=== General duties ===
The work of a sheriff principal is partly judicial and partly administrative, consisting broadly of the following:

- conventional judicial duties in the Sheriff courts;
- judicial and quasi-judicial work arising under various statutes;
- administrative functions in relation to the courts within a sheriff principal's sheriffdom;
- powers of appointment;
- miscellaneous advisory and consultative functions;
- ceremonial functions.

=== Judicial ===
A sheriff principal sometimes sits in criminal courts or conducts major fatal accident inquiries. Following the passage and commencement of the Courts Reform (Scotland) Act 2014 by the Scottish Parliament sheriffs principal have sat ex officio as appeal sheriffs in the Sheriff Appeal Court with jurisdiction over both civil and criminal appeals.

In terms of the Sheriff Courts (Scotland) Act 1971, as reaffirmed by the Courts Reform (Scotland) Act 2014, sheriffs principal are charged with a number of duties in respect of the courts for which they are responsible, including in particular a duty “to secure the speedy and efficient disposal of business in the sheriff courts of that sheriffdom”.

=== Administrative ===
In terms of the Merchant Shipping Act 1995 all of the sheriffs principal are Commissioners of Northern Lighthouses and serve on the Northern Lighthouse Board.

The Sheriff Principal of Lothian and Borders is Sheriff of Chancery (disposes of petitions for rights of succession to land and intestate estates; see Chancery (Scotland)).

A sheriff principal might serve as member of the Scottish Civil Justice Council, the Advisory Council on Messengers-at-Arms and Sheriff Officers, the Criminal Justice Forum, the Security Service Tribunal, the Intelligence Services Tribunal, and various other bodies.

== Current sheriffs principal ==
Sheriffs principal and their sheriffdoms
Sheriffdom	Sheriff principal	Main court
Glasgow and Strathkelvin	Temporary Sheriff Principal Stuart Reid	Glasgow Sheriff Court
Grampian, Highland and Islands	Sheriff Principal Andrew Miller	Inverness Sheriff Court
Lothian and Borders	Sheriff Principal Nigel Ross	Edinburgh Sheriff Court
North Strathclyde	Temporary Sheriff Principal Brian Mohan	Paisley Sheriff Court
South Strathclyde, Dumfries and Galloway	Sheriff Principal Kate Dowdalls KC	Hamilton Sheriff Court
Tayside, Central and Fife	Sheriff Principal Gillian Wade KC	Perth Sheriff Court

== Order of precedence ==
By virtue of an Order of Precedence established by King Edward VII a sheriff principal, in his or her own sheriffdom, ranks in precedence immediately after the royal family. For that reason sheriffs principal are from time to time expected, and are occasionally commanded, to be present at royal and other ceremonial functions within their sheriffdoms.

Order of precedence in Scotland
Preceded by Lords Lieutenant (see list here)	Order of precedence in Scotland (gentlemen)	Succeeded by David Lammy as Lord Chancellor

== See also ==
- Sheriff court
- Courts of Scotland
- Scots law
- Sheriff
- Sheriff-substitute
- Senator of the College of Justice

== Bibliography ==
- Stair Memorial Encyclopaedia of the Laws of Scotland
