= Sentencing guidelines =

Sentencing guidelines define a recommended sentencing range for a criminal defendant, based upon characteristics of the defendant and of the criminal charge. Depending upon the jurisdiction, sentencing guidelines may be nonbinding, or their application may be mandatory for the criminal offenses that they cover.

By contrast, mandatory sentencing involves the imposition of legal parameters for criminal sentences, typically mandatory minimum terms of imprisonment.

== Worldwide ==
=== United States ===
In the United States federal courts, the Federal Sentencing Guidelines have long been applied to criminal sentencings. State courts use their own sentencing guidelines. The Federal Sentencing Guidelines are non-binding independent agency recommendations that inform sentencing in law. Courts consider these advisory forms, which contain maximum and minimum sentences, before deciding a defendant's sentence.

"The Sentencing Guidelines enumerate aggravating and mitigating circumstances, assign scores based on a defendant's criminal record and based on the seriousness of the crime, and specify a range of punishments for each crime."

State sentencing guidelines vary significantly in their complexity, and whether they are non-binding or mandatory in their application.

=== United Kingdom ===
In England and Wales, the Sentencing Council (formerly the Sentencing Guidelines Council) sets sentencing guidelines, and in Scotland the Scottish Sentencing Council holds this responsibility. There are no sentencing guidelines for Northern Ireland.

=== Canada ===
Canada does not possess sentencing guidelines or a sentencing commission.

== See also ==
- Aggravated felony
- Sentencing disparity
- Imprisonment
