= Sheriff Principal of Glasgow and Strathkelvin =

The Sheriff Principal of Glasgow and Strathkelvin is the head of the judicial system of the sheriffdom of Glasgow and Strathkelvin, one of the six sheriffdoms covering the whole of Scotland. The current sheriffdoms were created in 1975 to replace the previous arrangement of 12 sheriffdoms. The sheriffdom of Glasgow and Strathkelvin maintains a single Sheriff Court based in Glasgow.

The Sheriff Principal, usually a King's Counsel (KC), is appointed by the King on the recommendation of the First Minister, who receives recommendations from the Judicial Appointments Board for Scotland. They must have been qualified as an advocate or solicitor for at least ten years and are responsible for the administrative oversight of the judicial system within the sheriffdom, which employs a number of legally qualified sheriffs who are responsible for the hearing of cases. The Sheriff Principal can hear certain cases himself and occasionally conducts major fatal accident inquiries. Historically, the Sheriff Principal would also hear appeals against the judgements of his sheriffs, however, most of the jurisdiction of the Sheriff Principal to hear appeals has now been transferred to the Sheriff Appeal Court in terms of the Courts Reform (Scotland) Act 2014.

== Sheriffs Principal of Glasgow and Strathkelvin ==
- 1975–1977: Henry Stephen Wilson
- 1977–1980: Robert Reid, QC
- 1980–1986: Sir John Alexander Dick, QC
- 1986–1997: Norman Macleod
- 1997–2005: Edward F. Bowen QC (transferred to Sheriffdom of Lothian and Borders, 2005)
- 2005–2011: James Alastair Taylor
- 2011–2016: Craig A.L. Scott QC
- 2016–2023: Craig Turnbull
- May 2023- PRESENT : Aisha Anwar

== See also ==
- Historical development of Scottish sheriffdoms
