= Justice of the peace court =

Scottish judicial institution

Justice of the Peace Court
- Scottish version of the Royal Coat of Arms as used by the Courts in Scotland
- Established: 2008
- Composition method: Appointed by Scottish Ministers, on behalf and in the name of The King, on the recommendation of Justice of the Peace Advisory Committees.
- Authorised by: Criminal Proceedings etc. (Reform) (Scotland) Act 2007
- Appeals to: Sheriff Appeal Court
- Judge term length: 5 years
- Website: Official website

A justice of the peace court is the lowest authoritative criminal court in Scotland. The court operates under summary procedure and deals primarily with less serious criminal offences.

Established gradually from 2008, the courts replaced the system of district courts operated by local authorities. The new justice of the peace courts came under the organisation of the Scottish Courts and Tribunals Service and were organised geographically in line with Scotland's sheriffdoms.

The court is presided over by justices of the peace, which were first introduced in Scotland in the 17th century and previously administered justice in a variety of courts, as well as carrying out administrative duties in their local areas. Unlike justices in other parts of the UK, justices of the peace in Scotland now most commonly sit as a single bench with one judge.

== History ==
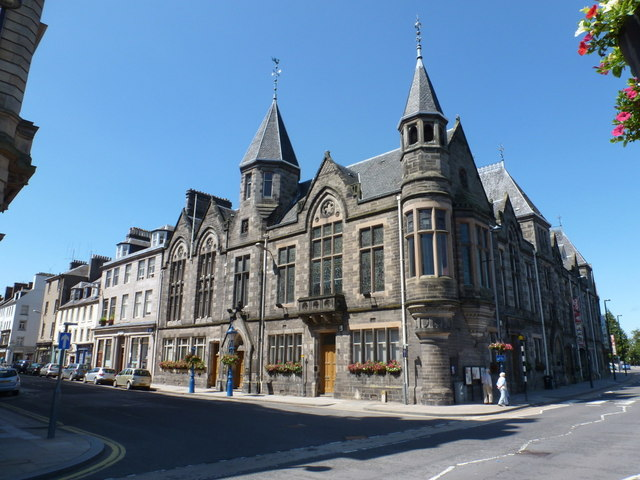
Perth's Municipal Buildings. Burgh and district courts often met in local civic buildings.

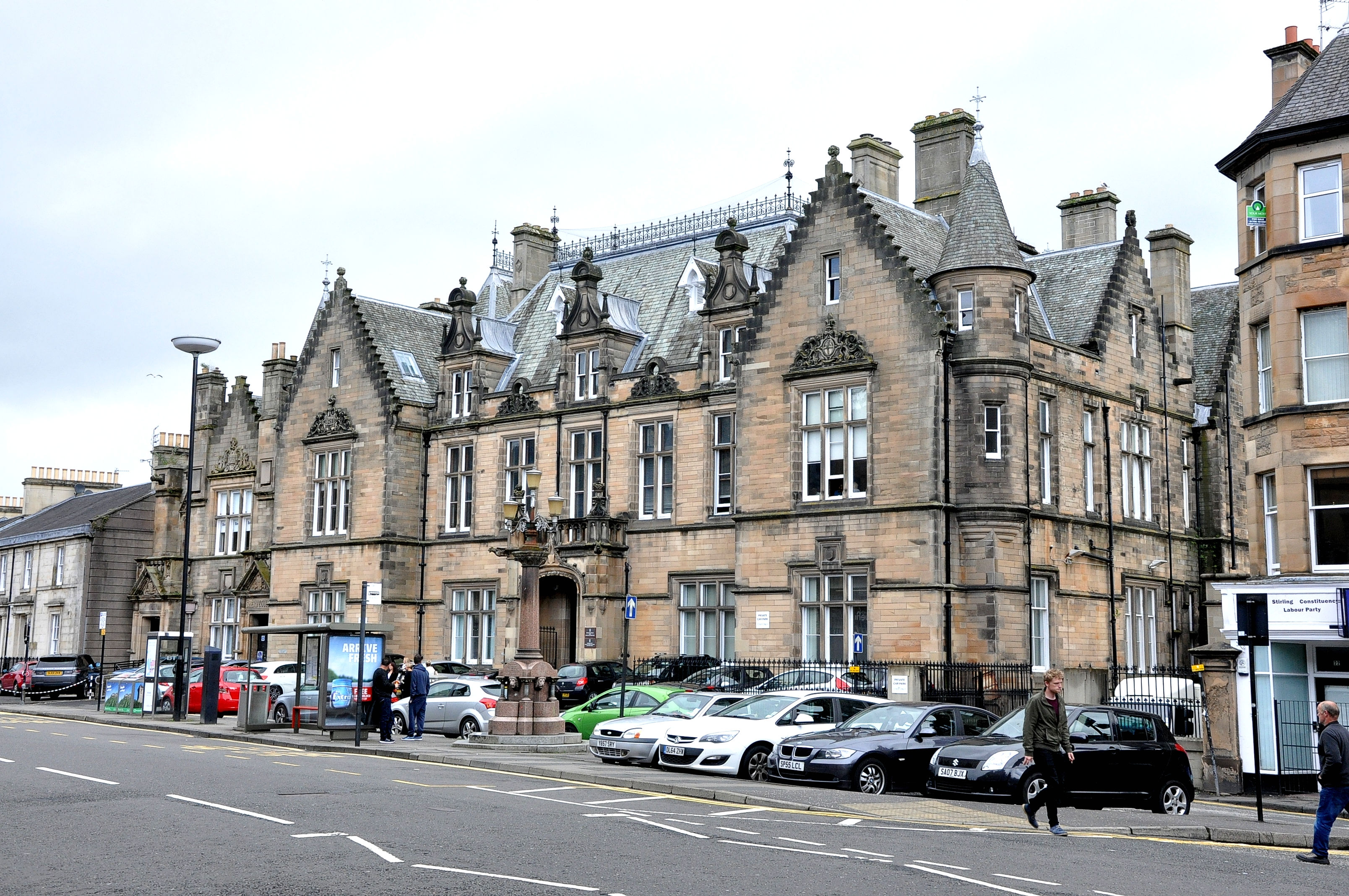
Stirling Sheriff and Justice of the Peace Court, co-located following the administrative merger in 2009.

The commission of the peace was originally instituted in Scotland in the 16th century. Initially, justices were given the task of administering the county within which they resided until this work passed to the county councils with their establishment in 1888. Justices of the peace were then left with jurisdiction in the licensing board and minor criminal cases.

=== Preceding court structures ===
The creation of a uniform system of district courts across Scotland, introduced in 1975, regularised the courts that justices of the peace sat in. The district courts replaced a number of "inferior courts", which were listed in the 1975 legislation as "justice of the peace courts, quarter sessions, burgh courts, police courts, and the court of the bailie of the river and firth of Clyde".

The new district courts sat in each local authority district and administered criminal law under summary procedure.

=== Emergence of the JP Court ===
The justice of the peace courts replaced the district courts in a rolling programme of court unification that concluded in 2010 under the terms of the Criminal Proceedings etc. (Reform) (Scotland) Act 2007. As part of the changes, responsibility for the management of the court was moved from local authorities to the Scottish Courts and Tribunals Service. The district courts were replaced by justice of the peace courts as follows:

- Sheriffdom of Lothian and Borders, 10 March 2008
- Sheriffdom of Grampian, Highlands and Islands, 2 June 2008
- Sheriffdom of Glasgow and Strathkelvin, 8 December 2008
- Sheriffdom of Tayside, Central and Fife, 23 February 2009
- Sheriffdom of North Strathclyde, 14 December 2009
- Sheriffdom of South Strathclyde, Dumfries & Galloway, 22 February 2010

=== Stipendiary magistrates and summary sheriffs ===
In Glasgow, some JP courts were presided over by a stipendiary magistrate, who were paid and required to be legally qualified. A stipendiary magistrate could impose a higher maximum sentence than a justice of the peace: up to twelve months imprisonment or a fine not exceeding £10,000, which was the same as that of a sheriff sitting alone under summary procedure. The option of appointing a stipendiary magistrate to a busy lay court had existed since the end of the 19th century.

The position of stipendiary magistrate was abolished by the Courts Reform (Scotland) Act 2014, being replaced with summary sheriffs with similar powers. Unlike a sheriff, a summary sheriff can exercise the jurisdiction and powers of a justice of the peace.

== Remit and jurisdiction ==
JP courts deal with many minor offences, including breach of the peace, assaults, petty theft, road traffic offences and offences under the Civic Government (Scotland) Act 1982.

JP courts have the power to sentence imprisonment for any period not exceeding sixty days; a fine not exceeding level 4 on the standard scale; to find caution (in lieu of or in addition to such imprisonment or fine) for good behaviour for any period not exceeding six months and to an amount not exceeding level 4 on the standard scale; or failing payment of such fine or on failure to find such caution, to impose imprisonment in proportion to the amount of the fine, etc. They also have the power to make the same orders following conviction as the sheriff court, such as a disqualification order under section 40 of the Animal Health and Welfare (Scotland) Act 2006, and can disqualify a person from driving. Since these powers were enlarged in 2007, JP courts have been involved in increasingly serious cases, where their powers are considered appropriate. Their judgments can be appealed to the Sheriff Appeal Court, however further appeals to High Court of Justiciary can only be made on a point of law.

=== Jurisdiction ===
Justice of the peace courts exist in every sheriff court district in Scotland, with the exception of Lerwick, Kirkwall, Wick, Stornoway, Lochmaddy and Portree. The courts have jurisdiction not only in the sheriff court district they are located, but also in any sheriff court district in the wider sheriffdom. JPs may also grant warrants throughout the sheriffdom they are appointed to, and exercise a number of other signing powers at any place in Scotland.

=== Signing duties ===
Justices acting personally have a role in signing duties, for example in granting search warrants and emergency child protection orders, or taking sworn affidavits and making statutory declarations under oath.

== Justices in Scotland ==
Justices of the peace will sit as a bench either singularly, or occasionally in some areas as a bench of three. They are known informally as "JPs" or "Justices" and are addressed in court as "Your Honour".

Justices are appointed by the Scottish Ministers on behalf of The Crown, based on a recommendation by the Justice of the Peace Advisory Committee (JPAC) in each Sheriffdom, for a renewable term of five years. JPACs are responsible for recruitment and retention of justices in each sheriffdom, and also for the training of new justices which typically lasts from 12 to 18 months.

As lay magistrates, justices of the peace do not have to be legally qualified. If a justice is a practising solicitor, he or she will be disqualified from appearing in the JP court in the sheriffdom he operates in. A JP who becomes a local councillor, Member of Parliament, member of the House of Lords or Member of the Scottish Parliament will be excluded from exercising his or her judicial functions. Justices will sit with a clerk of the court, who is required to be either a solicitor or advocate, and can act as a legal advisor to the court.

JPs in Scotland are collectively represented by the Scottish Justices Association.

== See also ==
- Judiciary of Scotland
- Judiciary of the United Kingdom
- Magistrates' Court (English equivalent of a Justice of the Peace Court)
