= Act of Adjournal =

Secondary legislation made by the High Court of Justiciary of Scotland

An Act of Adjournal is secondary legislation made by the High Court of Justiciary, the supreme criminal court of Scotland, to regulate the proceedings of Scottish courts hearing criminal matters. Now primarily derived from the Criminal Procedure (Scotland) Act 1995, the original power to create Acts of Adjournal is derived from an Act of the Parliament of Scotland in 1672. Before promulgation, Acts of Adjournal are reviewed and may be commented upon by the Criminal Courts Rules Council.

Following Scottish devolution and the establishment of the Scottish Parliament, Acts of Adjournal are made as Scottish Statutory Instruments. Before devolution, acts were made as United Kingdom statutory instruments.

== History ==
=== Courts Act 1672 ===
The Courts Act 1672 (c. 40) (originally Act concerning the regulation of the judicatories) created the High Court of Justiciary by attaching five Lords of Session to the Lord Justice General and Lord Justice Clerk. The act provided that "the judges of that court [...] regulate the inferior officers thereof, and order every other thing concerning the said court," a provision which remains in force and which created the distinction between Acts of Adjournal and Acts of Sederunt.

In the 19th century, a reforming of the High Court of Justiciary made all Lords of Session ex officio Lords Commissioners of Justiciary. That reformation, while now repealed, is replicated by the Criminal Procedure (Scotland) Act 1995, which further provides that the Lord President of the Court of Session is to hold the office of Lord Justice General.

=== Treaty of Union ===
The Treaty of Union between Scotland and England, which formed the Kingdom of Great Britain, required that the High Court of Justiciary "remain in all time coming, as it is now constituted by the laws of [the Kingdom of Scotland]." As a result, the Courts Act 1672 continues to be the original source of the court's authority to regulate. However, in the time since, laws enacted by the Parliament of Great Britain, the Parliament of the United Kingdom, and the Scottish Parliament have expanded or elaborated upon the Court's power as is permitted by the Treaty of Union, which provides that the Court is "subject, nevertheless, to such regulations as shall be made by the parliament of Great Britain."
