= Sheriffdom =

Judicial district in Scotland

A sheriffdom is a judicial district in Scotland, led by a sheriff principal. Since 1 January 1975, there have been six sheriffdoms. Each sheriffdom is divided into a series of sheriff court districts, and each sheriff court is presided over by a resident or floating sheriff (a legally qualified judge). Sheriffs principal and resident or floating sheriffs are all members of the judiciary of Scotland.

== History ==
=== Before 1975 ===
Sheriffdoms were originally identical to the shires of Scotland, originating in the twelfth century. Until the eighteenth century the office of sheriff was often hereditary, but this was ended following the unsuccessful Jacobite Rising of 1745. The Heritable Jurisdictions (Scotland) Act 1746 (20 Geo. 2. c. 43) revested the government of the shires in the Crown, compensating those office holders who were displaced. The Sheriffs (Scotland) Act 1747 (21 Geo. 2. c. 19) reduced the office of sheriff principal to a largely ceremonial one, with a sheriff depute or sheriff substitute appointed to each "county, shire or stewartry". The sheriff deputes, who were paid a salary by the Crown, were qualified advocates and took charge of sheriff courts. By the nineteenth century, the office of sheriff principal was an additional title held by the lord lieutenant of the county, and the Circuit Courts (Scotland) Act 1828 (9 Geo. 4. c. 29) redesignated sheriff deputes as simply "sheriffs".

The Heritable Jurisdictions (Scotland) Act 1746 also began the grouping of two or more counties under a single sheriffdom. This process continued so that by 1975 there were 12 sheriffdoms with only the county of Lanarkshire not combined.

=== Since 1975 ===
New boundaries defined sheriffdoms in reference to regions, districts and islands areas which were then to be created on 16 May 1975. This reduced the number of sheriffdoms to six.

The sheriffdoms were redefined again with effect from 1 April 1996, when new local government areas were created. The boundaries of four sheriffdoms were unchanged. The boundaries of the other two were altered, so as to transfer an area around Chryston from the sheriffdom of Glasgow and Strathkelvin to the sheriffdom of South Strathclyde, Dumfries and Galloway. Elsewhere boundaries were simply redefined by reference to new local authority areas and electoral wards.

Sheriffdom	Counties comprised in sheriffdom from 1 January 1975	Regions, Island areas and Districts comprised in sheriffdom from 16 May 1975	Areas comprised in sheriffdom from 1 April 1996
Glasgow and Strathkelvin	That part of the County of Lanark comprising the sheriff court district of Glasgow	The districts of City of Glasgow and Strathkelvin	City of Glasgow, part of East Dunbartonshire (wards 11–26); and part of South Lanarkshire (wards 62–74)
Grampian, Highland and Islands	The counties of Inverness, Nairn, Ross and Cromarty, Moray, Caithness, Sutherland, Orkney, Zetland, Aberdeen, Kincardine and Banff; and that part of the County of Argyll comprised in the existing sheriff court district of Fort William	The regions of Grampian and Highland, the Islands areas of Orkney, Shetland and Western Isles	Aberdeen City, Aberdeenshire, Highland, Moray, Orkney Islands, Shetland Islands and Western Isles
Lothian and Borders	The counties of East Lothian, Midlothian, West Lothian, Berwick, Peebles, Roxburgh and Selkirk	The regions of Lothian and Borders	City of Edinburgh, East Lothian, Midlothian, West Lothian and Scottish Borders
North Strathclyde	The counties of Renfrew, Argyll (without the part comprised in the existing sheriff court district of Fort William), Dumbarton, Bute and that part of the county of Ayr comprising the sheriff court district of Kilmarnock	The districts of Argyll and Bute, Dumbarton, Clydebank, Bearsden and Milngavie, Renfrew, Eastwood, Inverclyde, Cunninghame and Kilmarnock and Loudoun	Argyll and Bute, North Ayrshire, West Dunbartonshire, Inverclyde, East Renfrewshire and Renfrewshire; part of East Ayrshire (wards 1-20); and part of East Dunbartonshire (wards 1–10)
South Strathclyde, Dumfries and Galloway	The counties of Dumfries, Kirkcudbright and Wigtown; that part of the county of Ayr comprising the sheriff court district of Ayr	The region of Dumfries and Galloway; the districts of Monklands, Cumbernauld, Hamilton, Motherwell, East Kilbride, Kyle and Carrick and Cumnock and Doon Valley	South Ayrshire, Dumfries and Galloway and North Lanarkshire; part of East Ayrshire, (wards 21–30) and part of South Lanarkshire (wards 1-61)
Tayside, Central and Fife	The counties of Perth, Angus, Stirling, Clackmannan, Fife and Kinross	The regions of Tayside, Central and Fife	Angus, Clackmannanshire, Dundee City, Falkirk, Fife, Perth and Kinross and Stirling

Each sheriffdom has a full-time sheriff principal. Sheriffdoms are divided into sheriff court districts, each with one or more sheriff.
