= Lothian and Borders =

Administrative area of Scotland

Coordinates: 55.525°N 2.749°W

Lothian and Borders is an area in Scotland consisting of the East Lothian, City of Edinburgh, Midlothian, West Lothian council areas (collectively known as Lothian) along with the Scottish Borders.

The area constitutes a sheriffdom, and was also served by the Lothian and Borders Police and the Lothian and Borders Fire and Rescue Service until these were merged into new Scotland-wide services.
