= Exclusive jurisdiction =

Legal arrangement of court cases

Exclusive jurisdiction exists in civil procedure if one court has the power to adjudicate a case to the exclusion of all other courts. The opposite situation is concurrent jurisdiction (or non-exclusive jurisdiction) in which more than one court may take jurisdiction over the case.

Exclusive jurisdiction is typically defined in terms of subject matter.

For example, 28 U.S.C. § 1334 gives the United States district courts exclusive jurisdiction over all matters arising in bankruptcy with a few exceptions.

On the federal level, exclusive jurisdiction allows the US Supreme Court to review the decisions in lower courts.

Various states usually grant exclusive jurisdiction for filing lawsuits in one particular circuit court, police court, quasi-appellate body, or superior court.

== See also ==
- Original jurisdiction--the power of a court to hear a case for the first time
- Appellate jurisdiction--the power of a court to hear a case on appeal
