= Law Society of Scotland =

Professional governing body for Scottish solicitors

The Law Society of Scotland
- Comann Lagh na h-Alba
- Predecessor: General Council of Solicitors in Scotland
- Formation: 1949; 77 years ago
- Type: Professional organisation
- Headquarters: Atria One, 144 Morrison Street, Edinburgh, Scotland
- Region served: Scotland
- President: Patricia Thom
- Chief Executive: Ben Kemp
- Website: www.lawscot.org.uk

The Law Society of Scotland (Scottish Gaelic: Comann Lagh na h-Alba) is the professional governing body for Scottish solicitors. Its goal is to promote excellence among solicitors through the support and regulation of its members. It is also committed to promoting the interests of the public in relation to the profession. The Society seeks to contribute to the shaping of the law for the benefit of both the public and the profession.

The Society was established by statute in 1949 and its rules are set out in the Solicitors (Scotland) Act 1980. All practising solicitors, currently around 13,000, are members. The Society is funded by its members and has an annual budget of almost £8 million.

== History ==
Lawyers in Scotland have been organised in professional bodies since at least the sixteenth century. The Faculty of Advocates was established as the body for practising advocates in 1532, though its origins are thought to date from even earlier. Other lawyers were represented by associations and faculties of procurators and solicitors. Among those that still exist, the Society of Writers to His Majesty's Signet (WS Society) was formally established in 1594 and the Royal Faculty of Procurators in Glasgow was incorporated before 1668.

As the legal profession expanded in line with the volume of legislation introduced in the twentieth century, it became clear that a representative body for all solicitors was needed along with reform of the informal system of lawyers voluntarily providing legal services to those who could not afford representation, which had existed since 1424. The Legal Aid and Solicitors (Scotland) Act 1949 established the Law Society of Scotland as the governing body for solicitors at the same time as it laid the foundation of the modern legal aid and assistance scheme.

== Structure ==
Solicitors elect representatives to sit on the Society's Council, the ruling body. The council has overall responsibility for strategy and policy. The work of the council is supported by the Management Board, which draws members from the Council and the Society's executive staff. This is the principal decision-making team at the Society.

The Society's president and the vice president hold office for one year. The current president is Patricia Thom, while Serena Sutherland is the vice president. The immediate past president is Susan Murray. The chief executive is responsible for the day-to-day operations of the Society, working with a staff of approximately 120. The current chief executive is Ben Kemp.

Most of the Society's departments are grouped in five main areas of work: regulation and standards; member services and engagement; education, training and qualifications; external relations; finance and operations. Other departments work within those areas. Policy is developed by teams in external relations and education, training and qualifications.

The work of the Society is supported by solicitors and non-solicitors who contribute their time and expertise through many committees and working groups.

From 2012 to 2014, the Society went through a process to reform its structures and governance. Some new committees and the Management Board were established as part of this governance reform. A consultation on the composition and election of the council was held, and a new constitution was drafted.

== See also ==
- Crown Office and Procurator Fiscal Service
- Law Society
- Law Society of Northern Ireland
- Lord President of the Court of Session
- Scots law
- Scottish Court Service
- Scottish Legal Aid Board
- The Law Society of England and Wales
