= Courts Reform (Scotland) Act 2014 =

Act of the Scottish Parliament

Courts Reform (Scotland) Act 2014 (Note: Section 139.)
- Act of the Scottish Parliament
- Scottish Parliament
- Long title: An Act of the Scottish Parliament to make provision about the sheriff courts; to establish a Sheriff Appeal Court; to make provision about civil court procedure; to make provision about appeals in civil proceedings; to make provision about appeals in criminal proceedings; to make provision about judges of the Court of Session; to make provision about the Scottish Land Court; to make provision about justice of the peace courts; to rename the Scottish Court Service and give it functions in relation to tribunals; to provide for assistants to the Judicial Appointments Board for Scotland; and for connected purposes.
- Citation: 2014 asp 18
- Introduced by: Kenny MacAskill
- Territorial extent: Scotland

Dates
- Royal assent: 10 November 2014
- Commencement: various (Note: Section 138.)

Other legislation
- Amends: Promissory Oaths Act 1868; Promissory Oaths Act 1871; Law Reform (Miscellaneous Provisions) (Scotland) Act 1980; Civil Jurisdiction and Judgments Act 1982; Law Reform (Miscellaneous Provisions) (Scotland) Act 1985; Legal Aid (Scotland) Act 1986; Court of Session Act 1988; Law Reform (Miscellaneous Provisions) (Scotland) Act 1990; Criminal Procedure (Scotland) Act 1995; Constitutional Reform Act 2005; Judiciary and Courts (Scotland) Act 2008; Tribunals (Scotland) Act 2014
- Amended by: Courts Reform (Scotland) Act 2014 (Consequential and Supplemental Provisions) Order 2018; Public Service Pensions and Judicial Offices Act 2022

Status: Amended

History of passage through the Parliament

Text of statute as originally enacted

Revised text of statute as amended

Text of the Courts Reform (Scotland) Act 2014 as in force today (including any amendments) within the United Kingdom, from legislation.gov.uk.

The Courts Reform (Scotland) Act 2014 (asp 18) is an act of the Scottish Parliament passed in October 2014 to improve access to the civil justice system and while making the Court of Session a place for the more complex cases.

== History ==
The origins of this radical legislative reform lie with the Gill Report of 2009. The bill was introduced by Kenny MacAskill MSP on 6 February 2014. The bill was passed by the Parliament on 7 October 2014. It received Royal Assent on 6 May 2015.

== Provisions ==
The legislation created a national Sheriff Appeal Court.

The legislation raised the threshold from £5,000 to £100,000 for a case to be brought to the Court of Session. Some changes, such as a reduced ability to recover counsel's fees, make arbitration a more attractive means of dispute resolution.
