= Edinburgh Sheriff Court =

Court in Edinburgh, Scotland

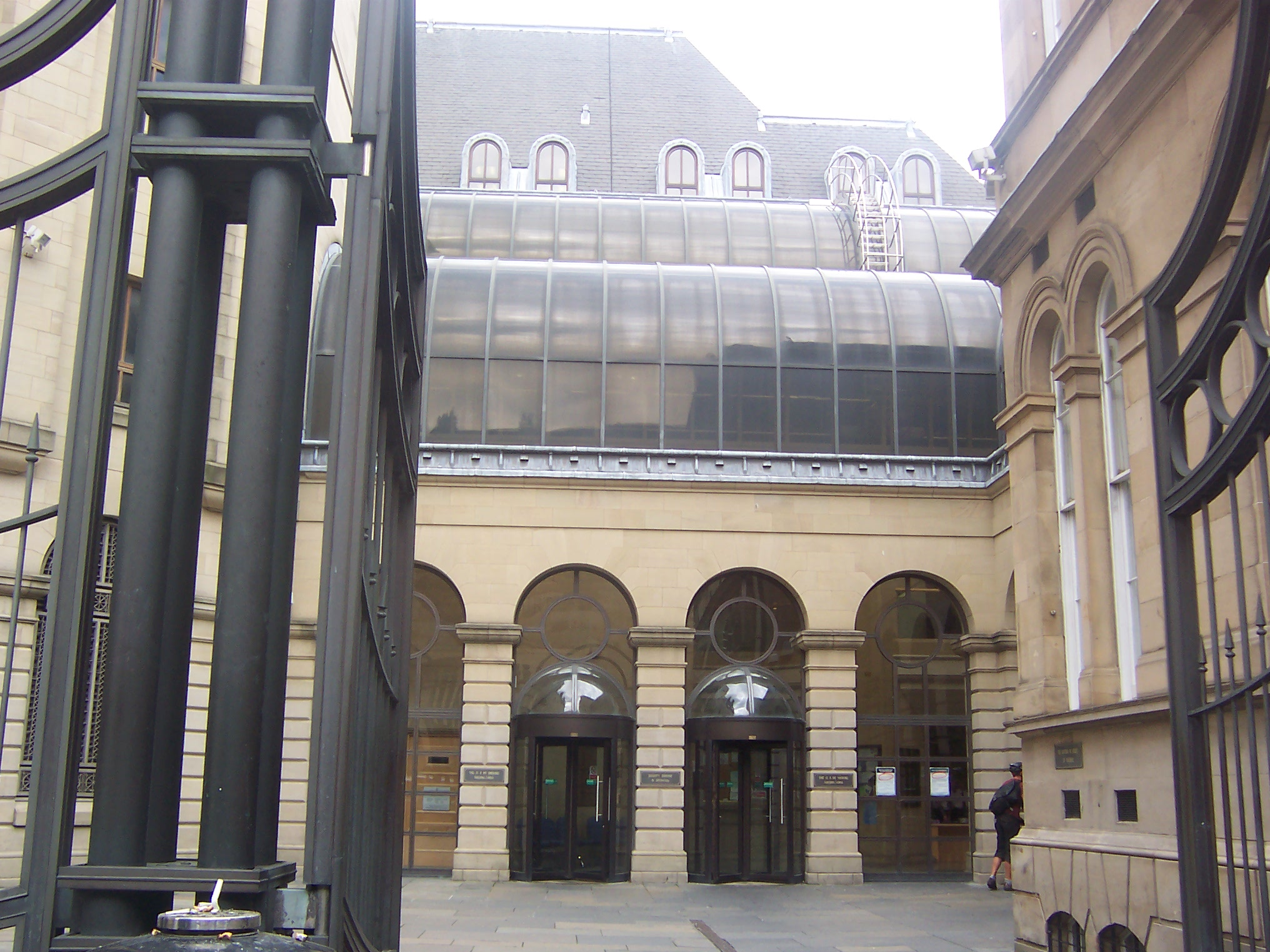
- Edinburgh Sheriff Court
- Interactive map of Edinburgh Sheriff Court
- 55.9478°N 3.1906°W
- Location: Edinburgh, Scotland
- Coordinates: 55.9478°N 3.1906°W
- Number of positions: 13

Sheriff Principal
- Currently: Nigel Ross
- Since: 2022

Edinburgh Sheriff Court is a sheriff court in Chambers Street in Edinburgh, Scotland, within the sheriffdom of Edinburgh and Borders.

== History ==
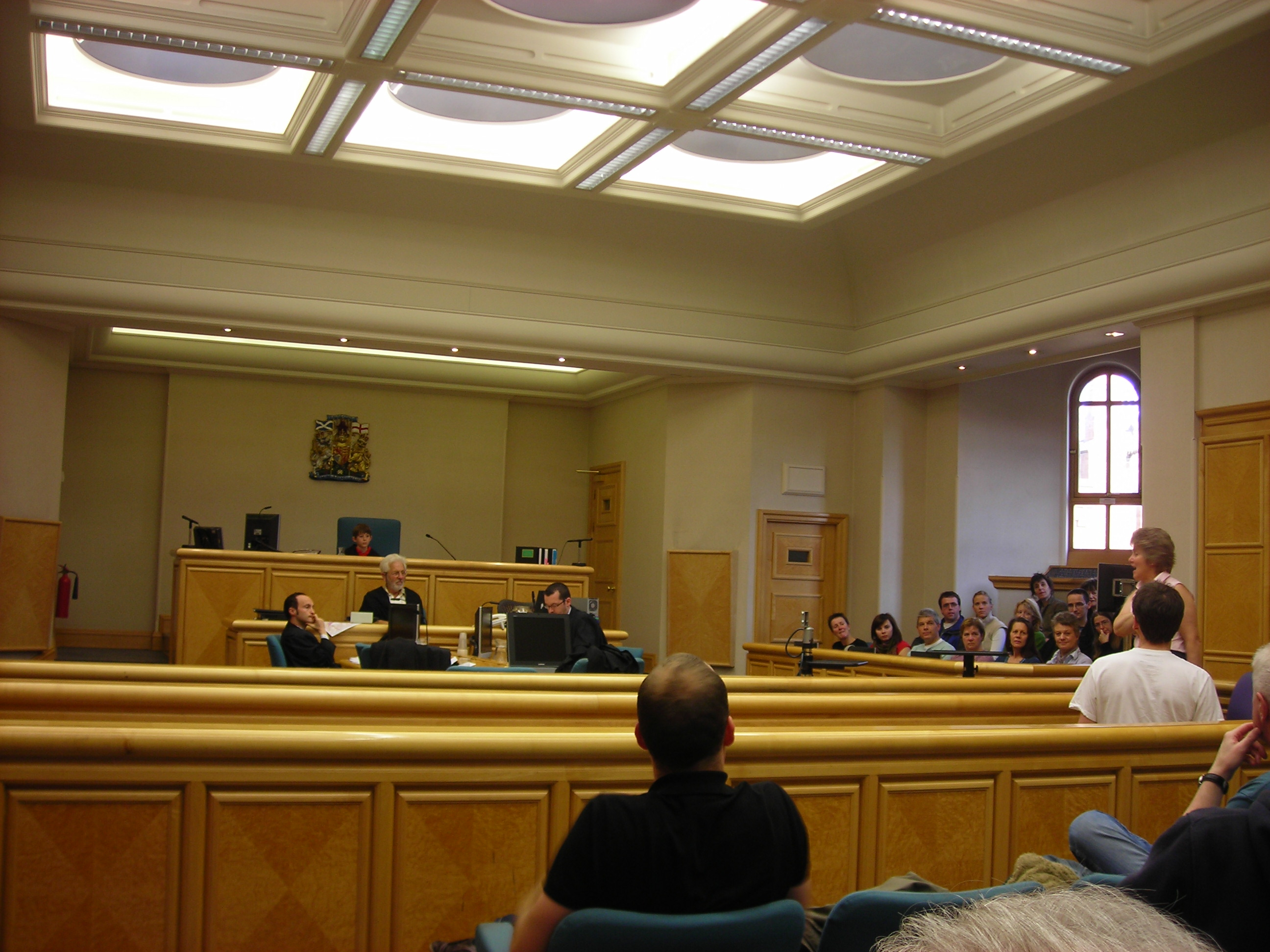
A courtroom in Edinburgh Sheriff Court

Until the mid-1990s, hearings took place in the Old Sheriff Court in the Lawnmarket. However, as the number of court cases in Edinburgh grew, it became necessary to commission a modern courthouse for criminal matters. The site that court officials selected had previously been occupied by a part of Heriot-Watt University.

The new courthouse was designed by John Kirkwood Wilson of PSA Projects, built in buff sandstone at a cost of £47 million, and was officially opened to the public by the sheriff principal, Gordon Nicholson, in September 1994. The Cowgate elevation is eight storeys high, and public access to the building is from Chambers Street at the fourth level, which is at street level when accessed from Chambers Street, owing to the steep terrain of Edinburgh's Old Town. Internally, the building was laid out to accommodate 16 courtrooms.

== Operations ==
The court deals with both criminal and civil cases. There are currently 16 full time Sheriffs in post at Edinburgh Sheriff Court. They sit alone in civil cases and are assisted by a jury of fifteen members selected from the electoral roll in some criminal cases (cases involving solemn proceedings only). The Sheriff Principal is Nigel Ross who was appointed in 2022.
