= Edinburgh Festival Voluntary Guides Association =

Non-profit group in Edinburgh, Scotland

- Abbreviation: EFVGA
- Formation: August 24, 1947; 79 years ago
- Legal status: Non-profit organisation
- Location: Edinburgh
- Services: Walking tours
- Website: https://www.edinburghfestivalguides.org

The Edinburgh Festival Voluntary Guides Association (EFVGA) is a non-profit group of volunteers who lead walking tours of the historic districts of Edinburgh, principally for visitors to Edinburgh's summer festivals. The organisation was set up as part of the first Edinburgh International Festival in 1947 and continues to operate under the patronage of the city's Lord Provost. The volunteer guides receive no remuneration, and no charge is made for most of their tours.

== Origins ==
During the planning for the first Edinburgh International Festival in 1947, the then Lord Provost, Sir John Falconer, issued an appeal for "citizens who will be prepared to act, in a voluntary capacity, as guides," their duties consisting of "taking parties of visitors … along the Royal Mile and explaining to them its historical associations." Twelve volunteers came forward to lead walking tours twice a day during the Festival. The tours, which were coordinated by John Bowman, a former City Water Engineer, were listed in the Festival's official programme under the heading "Special Tours".

The Festival Society provided secretarial and financial assistance and took responsibility for vetting the volunteers. A meeting place for the tours was provided in Cannonball House, a historic town house next to the entrance to Edinburgh Castle. The tours followed the length of the Royal Mile, ending at Holyrood Palace.

More volunteer guides were recruited for the 1948 Festival. In that year the group was officially constituted as the Edinburgh Festival Voluntary Guides Association, with Bowman serving as its first president and with the Lord Provost as its patron. By the time of the 1949 Festival, there were 40 guides in service.

Over the next few years, the tours grew in popularity, attracting about a thousand visitors per season by 1950.

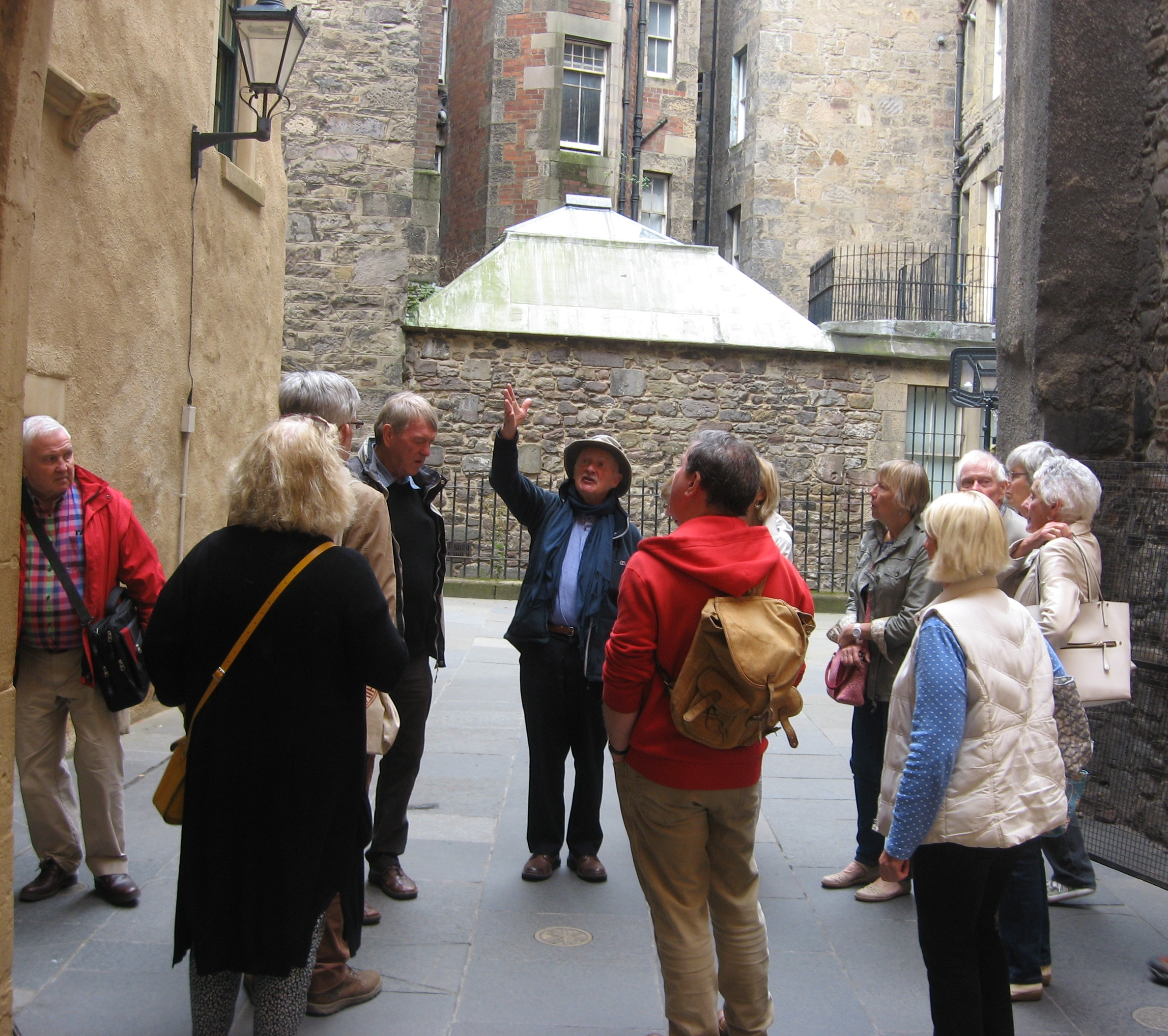
An EFVGA guide showing visitors the 16th-Century Riddle's Court

== Finances ==
The Festival Society discontinued its support for the Association in 1985. The Department of Extra-Mural Studies at the Edinburgh University stepped in with an offer of both secretarial and financial help, an arrangement which was to last for seven years. This was mainly thanks to the support of the Department's former director, Basil Skinner.

Today the Association is entirely self-supporting, with no funding from public sources. Its administrative costs are met from visitors' donations and also from charges made for private tours outside the Festival season.

== Current activities ==
The EFVGA currently has about 75 guides, of which 45 to 50 are active at any one time. All guides go through a rigorous training and assessment process.

The Association's main activity still consists of running free tours during the Festival season, although these are now officially part of the Festival Fringe rather than the International Festival. The group typically runs about 80 tours during the three weeks of the season. In 2013, it moved its base to the City Chambers from Cannonball House when that building was converted to a restaurant.

The Association also offers private tours on demand outside the Festival, for which it makes a small charge. In 2019, it ran free tours as part of Edinburgh's Open Streets programme, in which most of the Royal Mile and some adjacent streets were closed to motor vehicles but open to visitors on foot or bicycle once a month.

In the mid-1950s, a programme of free illustrated talks (originally known as "lantern lectures") was added to the Association's offering, and these continue to this day. The talks take place during the Festival season, and are typically on subjects relating to Edinburgh and Scottish history.

Because of the COVID-19 pandemic, the Association was only able to offer a reduced programme of tours during the 2020 and 2021 festival seasons, but returned to their normal full programme for 2022.

In August 2021, Edinburgh Council passed a resolution congratulating the volunteer guides on the 75th anniversary of the Association in 2022. The resolution, which was proposed by Cllr Amy McNeese-Mechan, also requested that the Lord Provost "marks the anniversary in an appropriate way".
