= Cannonball House (Edinburgh) =

Building in Scotland

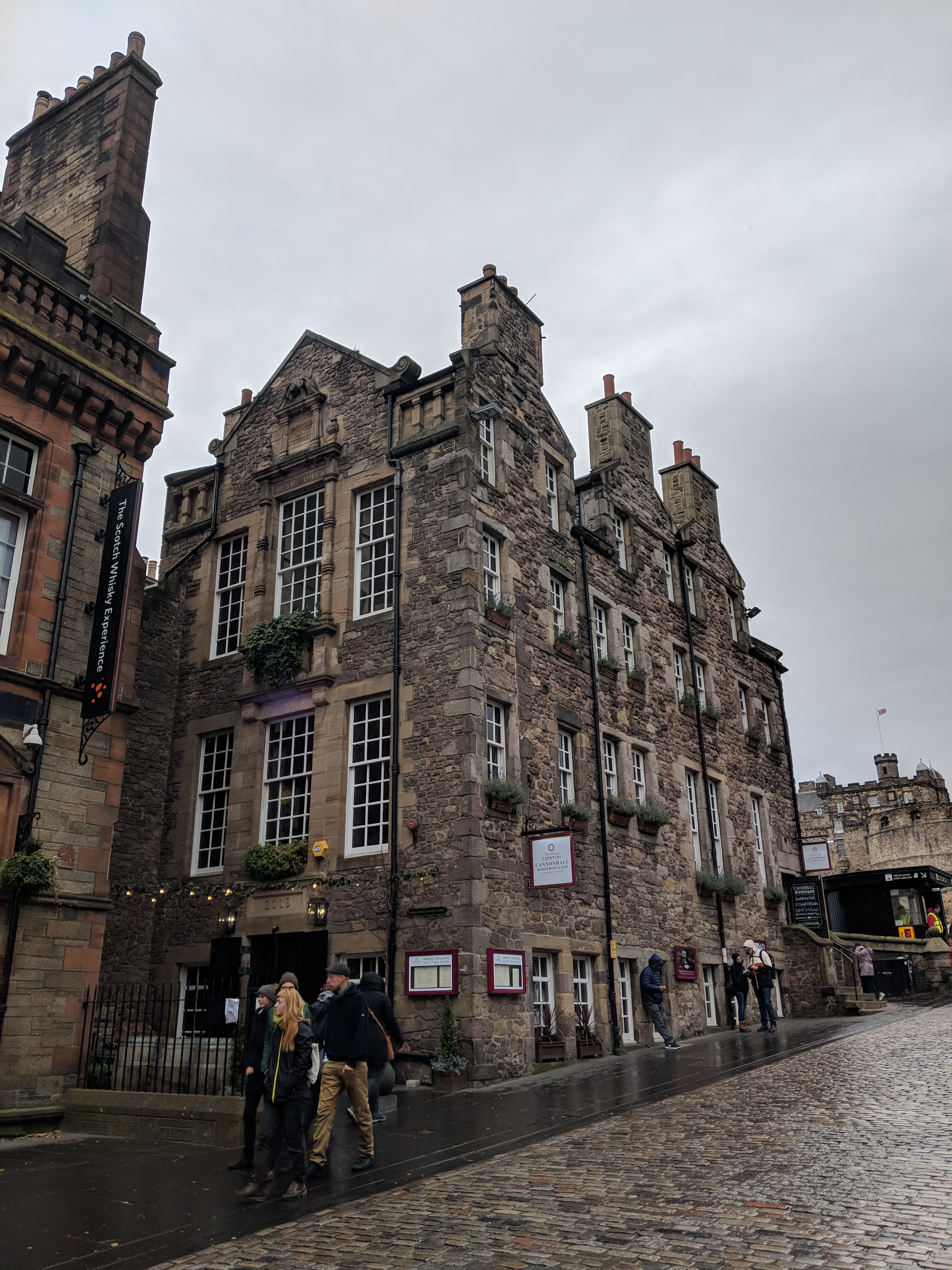
- The building in 2018, as seen from Castlehill

- Shown in Edinburgh city centre
- 55.94876°N 3.19622°W
- Location: Castlehill, Edinburgh, Scotland

History
- Built: 1630
- Built for: Alexander Mure

Site notes
- Restored: 1913
- Restored by: Edinburgh School Board

Listed Building – Category A
- Official name: 356 Castlehill And 2 Castle Wynd North, Cannonball House
- Designated: 14 December 1970
- Reference no.: LB28491

Cannonball House is a 17th-century town house on the Royal Mile in Edinburgh, Scotland. It was built in 1630 and substantially renovated in the early 20th century. It takes its name from a cannonball embedded in its western wall. The building is protected as a Category A listed building.

== Location ==
Cannonball House is situated at the west end of Castlehill, on Edinburgh's Royal Mile, immediately adjacent to the entrance to the esplanade of Edinburgh Castle. It has frontages on Castlehill and Castle Wynd Steps.

== History ==
The house was built in 1630 for Alexander Mure, a furrier and skinner. After falling into disrepair, it was renovated and altered in the late 17th century, with further alterations taking place in the mid-19th century.

In 1913, a substantial renovation project was undertaken by John Carfrae, architect to the Edinburgh School Board, as part of the conversion of the building to serve as an annex to the adjacent Castlehill School. The renovation involved the removal of a narrow passage named Blair's Close which originally ran through the house, although part of one of its walls, containing an arch and some corbelling, was retained. A cellar covered by a segmented arch was discovered and restored. Many of the original features were retained, but some old doors and internal finishes were donated to the Cockburn Association for installation at Moubray House and Lady Stair's House. The restored building provided four classrooms on the two main floors and a combined cookery classroom and workshop in the basement. The school closed in 1951, after which the original school building became the Scotch Whisky Experience visitor attraction. Cannonball House was then used as the Castlehill Urban Studies Centre, which claims to be the first successful urban studies centre in Britain. The centre was established by Walter Stephen, who ran it for 20 years.

From 1947 to 2013, a room in the house served as the meeting point for walking tours of the Royal Mile organised by the Edinburgh Festival Voluntary Guides Association as part of the Edinburgh International Festival.

Since 1970, Cannonball House has been protected by Historic Environment Scotland as a Category A listed building.

Since 2014, the house has been occupied by a restaurant run by Victor and Carina Contini.

=== Origin of the name ===
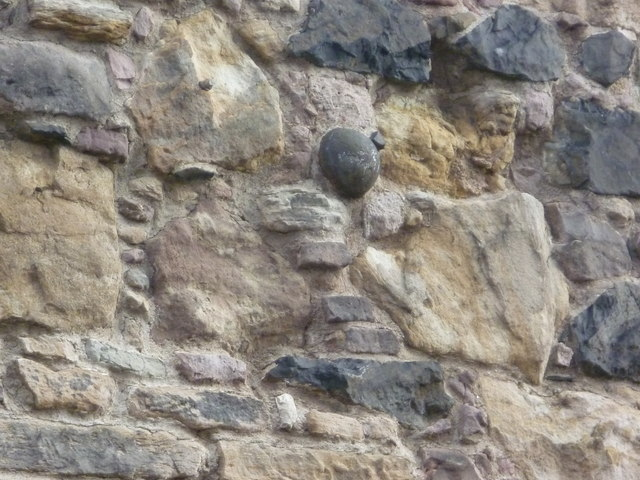
The Cannonball seen in the outside walls of the house

Cannonball House takes its name from a cannonball which is embedded in the building's west frontage, facing the castle. It is clearly visible from the top of Castle Wynd Steps.

There are conflicting explanations for how the cannonball came to be present in the wall. According to some sources, it was fired by General Preston's artillery from the castle's Half Moon Battery during an attack by Jacobite forces in the 1745 rising. But other historians refute this explanation, preferring instead the theory that the cannonball was deliberately put in place by engineers, to mark the "gravitational height" of the springs in Comiston. Starting in 1675, fresh water was piped from these springs, and later from springs on other high ground to the south of the city, to a reservoir situated across the road from the house. The cannonball indicates the elevation below which the water could be fed by gravity. The original reservoir survived until 1839, when it was replaced by a more modern structure, which remained in operation until 1991. It is now "tastefully conserved" as a retail unit and visitor attraction known as the Tartan Weaving Mill.

== Architectural features ==
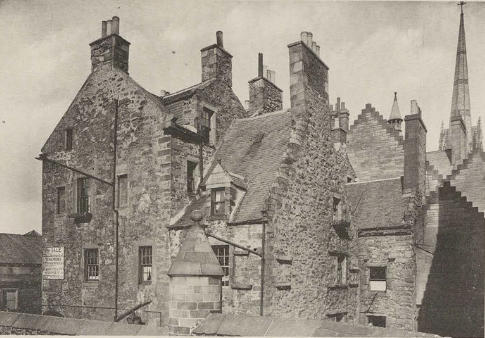
Cannonball House from the Castle Esplanade, circa 1909

Cannonball House has two main storeys along with a semi-basement and an attic. It has a substantial three-gabled frontage to the north (Castlehill) with a studded timber main door, reached by a short external stone stair. There is a crow-stepped gabled window to the rear. An unusual feature is the stone guides on the south and west elevations, intended for sliding the shutters.

The house's walls are of rubble (undressed stones rather than stones that have been neatly cut to shape) with ashlar dressing.

An inscription above one of the windows on the west frontage reads "AM MN 1630", these being the initials of Alexander Mure for whom the house was built and his wife Margaret Niellems, along with the year of construction (which was also the year of their marriage). An inscription on the east frontage reads "ESB 1913", a reference to the Edinburgh School Board and the date on which the building was incorporated into the adjacent school.
