= The Scotch Whisky Experience =

Visitor attraction in Edinburgh, UK

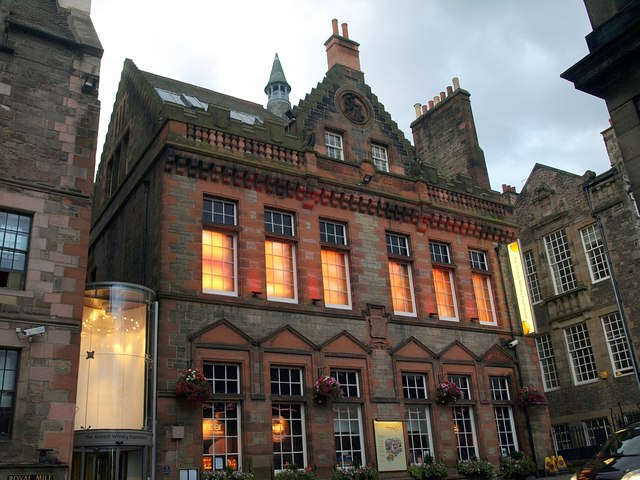
- The main facade viewed from the Royal Mile.

- Location within Edinburgh city centre
- Former name: The Scotch Whisky Heritage Centre
- Established: 5 May 1988; 38 years ago
- Location: 354 Castlehill, The Royal Mile, Edinburgh EH1 2NE, Scotland, United Kingdom
- Coordinates: 55°56′56″N 3°11′44″W
- Key holdings: The Diageo Claive Vidiz Whisky Collection
- Collection size: 3384 bottles
- Visitors: 401,000 (2023)
- Founder: Alastair McIntosh
- CEO: Susan Morrison
- Architect: Robert Wilson
- Public transit access: Edinburgh Waverley
- Website: www.scotchwhiskyexperience.co.uk
- Amber Restaurant & Whisky Bar

Restaurant information
- Established: 2001
- Head chef: David Neave
- Food type: Scottish cuisine

Listed Building – Category B
- Official name: 354 Castlehill And 17 Johnston Terrace, Former Castlehill School with Janitor's House, Ancillary Buildings, Railings and Retaining Wall
- Designated: 13 August 1987
- Reference no.: LB28490

The Scotch Whisky Experience (formerly the Scotch Whisky Heritage Centre) is a visitor attraction themed around Scotch whisky in Edinburgh, Scotland. The attraction occupies a Category B listed Victorian era school building, located on Castlehill, part of the Royal Mile in the Old Town. It is immediately adjacent to the esplanade of Edinburgh Castle, within the Edinburgh UNESCO World Heritage Site.

The attraction's main feature is a guided tour which introduces visitors to the history of Scotch whisky. Since May 2009, the attraction has been home to the Diageo Claive Vidiz Whisky Collection, one of the largest archival collections of Scotch whisky in the world.

The lower two floors of the attraction building are occupied by the Amber Restaurant & Whisky Bar, which serves traditional Scottish cuisine. The attraction also has a gift shop and corporate spaces, and hosts private whisky tastings.

== History ==
=== The Castlehill School ===
The Scotch Whisky Experience is located in the former premises of the Castlehill School. The school began accepting students from 1888, and was formally opened on 3 May 1889 as a primary, one of four schools opened in the city on the same day. The building was designed by architect Robert Wilson, and is notable for its Scots Baronial style and use of red Corncockle sandstone imported from Lochmaben. The land the school occupies had previously been the site of the Gordon House, residence of the 1st Duke of Gordon. Although the school was mixed, boys and girls were kept apart by separate sets of stairways – a design feature which the building still maintains.

The school was partially vacated in 1939 due to wartime evacuation. Due to falling school numbers, the school closed in 1951, fulfilling various roles afterwards. From 1954 it housed a catering school called the Central School Of Bakery and Catering. This closed in 1970. It housed a temporary exhibition on regimental history for the Commonwealth Games, and was converted into a council office in 1971. From 1975 it was an urban studies centre and theatre workshop with around 9000 children attending per year.

=== Creation ===
In the mid 1980s, Alastair McIntosh, a managing director of whisky blending firm William Muir Ltd, proposed the idea of an Edinburgh whisky attraction to several Scotch whisky companies. The purpose of the attraction was to capture tourists for whom travel to the Highlands was inaccessible. A director for the Scotch Whisky Experience later told the Scotsman newspaper, "A lot of people who came to Scotland didn't really travel much further north than the Perthshire area, so didn't even have access to visit the distilleries. The idea was that we set up something here, right in Edinburgh, where people could come and learn about Scotch whisky". By July 1987, nineteen Scotch whisky companies had jointly invested £2 million into the project.

A development site was originally identified in Leith, in a former bonded warehouse, but in 1986 McIntosh proposed to City of Edinburgh Council that the centrally located Castlehill School building would be better suited to museum usage than its dwindling educational role. McIntosh negotiated the sale of the building for £250,000, though part of the building, now known as Cannonball House, was split off and retained by the Education Department. The new attraction opened on 5 May 1988 as the Scotch Whisky Heritage Centre, an explicitly educational establishment. The main feature was a dark ride with 13 theatrical sets showcasing 300 years of whisky history. The ride vehicles were mock barrels. This was designed by Heritage Projects, who had previously worked on Jorvik Viking Centre in York.

=== Modern attraction ===
The attraction changed its name to The Scotch Whisky Experience in 2006. In 2008, the attraction reached an agreement with Diageo to display what was then the world's largest collection of Scotch whisky, consisting of 3,384 sealed bottles. The collection had been built up over 35 years by Brazilian whisky enthusiast Claive Vidiz, who believed it only right that the collection return to its home country. The collection, renamed the Diageo Claive Vidiz Whisky Collection, is housed in a specially designed glass and marble vault and was opened to the public by First Minister of Scotland Alex Salmond in May 2009.

The attraction's shop underwent a £1m refurbishment in 2012, to incorporate a host of new features, including an interactive tasting map and touch-screen distillery guide. During the same year, the International Spirits Challenge was held at the venue for the first time and it became home to the world's largest bottle of single malt whisky. This bottle is no longer on display having been auctioned in 2019.

In 2013, the attraction celebrated its 25th birthday, which included the launch of an anniversary blend and the unveiling of a one-off commemorative Quaich. Amber Restaurant and Whisky Bar – located in the vaults of the attraction – also underwent a refurbishment, unveiling a new bar which offered over 360 different whiskies from across Scotland.

The attraction's six-year, £7m programme of refurbishments came to an end in 2015 with an upgrade of the building's corporate spaces. In 2018, the attraction acquired a new audio-visual system allowing it to offer tours in British Sign Language and American Sign Language, and show subtitles in Spanish, French, German, Italian, Swedish and Dutch.

In January 2023, the attraction began work on a new tour experience, designed by Hatto + Partners. The attraction's long-running dark ride was removed as part of the project. It was replaced by three new areas, named 'Origins', 'The Art of Whisky Making' and 'Maturation', and the design included a Hüttinger kinetic sculpture. In total £3 million was spent on the upgrade. The new areas opened to the public in November 2023.

In 2025, the two unicorn sculptures atop the building were restored as part of a conservation project. The original horns, made from wood and lead, had been lost; replacements were carved by the attraction's staff.

== Visitor numbers ==
In 2013, 300,000 people visited the attraction, with more than 155,000 taking the tour. These figures rose to 308,000 people in 2014, with 157,000 taking the tour. In 2023 cumulative visitor numbers totalled 8.5 million. While visitors from traditional markets made up the bulk of visitors, people from emerging whisky markets, including China, Brazil and India, made up a large proportion of visitors.

== Awards ==
- Scottish Tourist Board (VisitScotland) – 5* Visitor Attraction
- Green Tourism Business Scheme – Silver
- Distillery Experience Awards – ‘Best Educational Experience’ – Winner 2014
- British Travel Awards – ‘Best Leisure Attraction’ – Bronze Medal 2014
- Icons of Whisky – ‘Best Whisky Attraction’ – Winner 2013
- Association of Scottish Visitor Attractions –‘Scotland’s Best Visitor Attraction’ – Winner 2011
- The Thistle Awards - 'Best Visitor Attraction - Winner 2024.
