= List of listed buildings in Edinburgh/29 =

This is a list of listed buildings in Edinburgh, Scotland.

== List ==
Name	Location	Date Listed	Grid Ref. (Note: Sometimes known as OSGB36, the grid reference (where provided) is based on the British national grid reference system used by the Ordnance Survey. • "Guide to National Grid". Ordnance Survey. • "Get-a-map". Ordnance Survey.)	Geo-coordinates	Notes	LB Number (Note: Historic Environment Scotland assign a unique alphanumeric identifier to each designated site in Scotland, for listed buildings this always begins with "LB", for example "LB12345".)	Image
Ferry Road, 372 Dunkeld Lodge				55°58′17″N 3°12′40″W	Category C(S)	28750	Upload Photo
Ferry Road, 376				55°58′16″N 3°12′44″W	Category C(S)	28751	Upload Photo
71-75 (Odd Nos) Dublin Street, Including Railings				55°57′29″N 3°11′38″W	Category B	28687	Upload Photo
32-38 (Even Nos) Dublin Street, Including Railings				55°57′26″N 3°11′39″W	Category B	28693	Upload Photo
24-28 (Even Nos) Dundas Street, Including Railings				55°57′26″N 3°11′59″W	Category B	28717	Upload Photo
88-102 (Even Nos) Dundas Street, Including Railings				55°57′32″N 3°12′02″W	Category B	28722	Upload Photo
Gilmerton, Drum Street, The Cove				55°54′20″N 3°07′59″W	Category B	28662	Upload Photo
25 Cramond Glebe Road, The Old Schoolhouse, Including Boundary Wall And Gatepiers				55°58′39″N 3°18′03″W	Category B	28607	Upload Photo
71 Dalkeith Road Including Boundary Walls And Pedestrian Gate				55°56′15″N 3°10′16″W	Category C(S)	28616	Upload Photo
18 Holyrood Park Road, St Leonard's Hall Including Boundary Walls				55°56′24″N 3°10′16″W	Category A	28619	Upload another image
39-43 (Odd Numbers) Dean Path, Including Boundary Wall				55°57′10″N 3°13′10″W	Category B	28636	Upload Photo
27 And 29 Cockburn Street				55°57′03″N 3°11′24″W	Category B	28577	Upload Photo
298 Colinton Road, Heather Cottage				55°54′29″N 3°15′13″W	Category C(S)	28579	Upload Photo
Cowgate 28-36				55°56′53″N 3°11′35″W	Category B	28599	Upload Photo
Chapel Street (Off) Chapel House (Archibald Bennet & Co)				55°56′42″N 3°11′07″W	Category B	28500	Upload Photo
2-4 (Inclusive Nos) North Charlotte Street With Railings And Lamp Standards				55°57′10″N 3°12′24″W	Category A	28509	Upload Photo
167 And 169 Canongate				55°57′05″N 3°10′49″W	Category A	28433	Upload another image
250-254 (Even Nos) Canongate				55°57′02″N 3°11′00″W	Category B	28456	Upload Photo
51-55 (Odd Nos) North Castle Street With Railings And Boundary Walls To Rear				55°57′12″N 3°12′13″W	Category A	28466	Upload Photo
22-26 (Even Nos) Castle Street With Railings				55°57′07″N 3°12′13″W	Category B	28473	Upload Photo
Buccleuch Place 5, 6				55°56′34″N 3°11′08″W	Category B	28381	Upload Photo
Buccleuch Place 36, 37 And 16-26 Buccleuch Street				55°56′36″N 3°11′07″W	Category B	28392	Upload Photo
26 Calton Hill Including Railings And Boundary Walls				55°57′16″N 3°11′08″W	Category B	28410	Upload Photo
28 Calton Hill, Rock House, Including Boundary Walls, Gateway And Gate				55°57′16″N 3°11′07″W	Category A	28411	Upload another image
136 And 138 Calton Road And 2-12 (Even Nos) Campbell's Close, Former Brewery Maltings				55°57′09″N 3°10′39″W	Category B	28412	Upload Photo
56 And 56A Candlemaker Row				55°56′50″N 3°11′31″W	Category C(S)	28418	Upload Photo
Canon Street 4 (Originally 1-4)				55°57′42″N 3°11′54″W	Category C(S)	28421	Upload Photo
Canon Street 7				55°57′43″N 3°11′55″W	Category C(S)	28422	Upload Photo
10 And 12 Blacket Place, Including Boundary Walls				55°56′15″N 3°10′26″W	Category B	28310	Upload Photo
63-67 (Odd Nos) Blackfriars Street, Lodge Of Journeymen Masons				55°56′57″N 3°11′08″W	Category C(S)	28328	Upload Photo
17 Boswall Road, Manor House, With Boundary Walls, Railings, Gates And Gateposts				55°58′47″N 3°12′42″W	Category B	28337	Upload Photo
21 And 23 Boswall Road, Forthview House, With Boundary Walls, Railings, Gates And Gateposts				55°58′47″N 3°12′40″W	Category B	28339	Upload Photo
1 Broughton Road, Heriot Hill House With Boundary Walls And Gatepiers				55°57′46″N 3°11′50″W	Category B	28358	Upload Photo
27-33 (Odd Nos) Broughton Street				55°57′26″N 3°11′16″W	Category B	28360	Upload Photo
35 And 37 Broughton Street				55°57′26″N 3°11′17″W	Category A	28361	Upload Photo
73-79 (Odd Nos) Broughton Street				55°57′30″N 3°11′21″W	Category B	28365	Upload Photo
17-20 (Inclusive Nos) Bank, Including Part Of 451 Lawnmarket To Rear				55°56′59″N 3°11′35″W	Category A	28264	Upload Photo
6 Barnshot Road, The Croft, With Boundary Wall And Gates				55°54′21″N 3°15′24″W	Category B	28271	Upload Photo
17 Barnshot Road, Abden With Boundary Wall, Gate Piers, Railings And Garage				55°54′21″N 3°15′20″W	Category B	28273	Upload Photo
Bath Place 8-20 Portobello				55°57′18″N 3°06′41″W	Category B	28276	Upload Photo
13, 15 Bell's Brae (Formerly Old Tollbooth Or Cathedral Mission)				55°57′08″N 3°12′58″W	Category A	28293	Upload another image
13 Blacket Place, Including Boundary Walls				55°56′12″N 3°10′28″W	Category B	28301	Upload Photo
Arboretum Road, 15 Fairfield Inverleith				55°58′07″N 3°12′56″W	Category B	28259	Upload Photo
9, 9A, 9B Albany Street, Including Railings				55°57′24″N 3°11′33″W	Category A	28220	Upload Photo
25, 25B Albany Street, Including Railings				55°57′25″N 3°11′29″W	Category A	28223	Upload Photo
5 Caroline Park, Dovecot And Boundary Wall To North West Of Caroline Park House				55°58′54″N 3°14′31″W	Category B	28139	Upload Photo
Liberton Drive, Liberton House, Dovecot				55°54′43″N 3°10′19″W	Category A	28141	Upload Photo
Lochend Road South, Lochend Park, Lochend Castle Dovecot				55°57′44″N 3°09′39″W	Category B	28142	Upload another image
Belford Road, Former Bell's Mills Granary				55°57′01″N 3°13′20″W	Category A	28149	Upload Photo
Slateford House 53 Lanark Road				55°55′21″N 3°14′59″W	Category B	28196	Upload Photo
Camus Park, Comiston House Stables				55°54′17″N 3°13′02″W	Category B	28045	Upload Photo
Drylaw House, Pair Of Gatepiers Off Groathill Road North				55°57′54″N 3°15′00″W	Category C(S)	28062	Upload Photo
Duddingston House Temple Duddingston Golf Course				55°56′33″N 3°08′11″W	Category A	28068	Upload Photo
82, Craigs Road, East Craigs (Scottish Agricultural Science Agency)				55°56′56″N 3°18′36″W	Category C(S)	28069	Upload Photo
Inch House Glenallan Drive Old Dalkeith Road And Gilmerton Road				55°55′30″N 3°09′32″W	Category A	28078	Upload Photo
Kingston Grange Kingston Avenue				55°55′08″N 3°08′53″W	Category B	28083	Upload Photo
Kingston Grange (Liberton Golf Club) Lodge (Original S. Section Only) And Gates On Gilmerton Road				55°55′01″N 3°09′06″W	Category B	28084	Upload Photo
Millbank Redhall Bank Road And Boag's Mill Road				55°55′06″N 3°15′24″W	Category B	28090	Upload Photo
19 Winton Loan, Morton House Belvedere				55°53′46″N 3°11′34″W	Category A	28094	Upload Photo
47 And 49 Mortonhall Gate, Mortonhall House With Terraces, Fountain Statue Plinth And Burial Ground				55°54′10″N 3°10′55″W	Category A	28096	Upload Photo
Niddrie Marischal House Tombhouse Niddrie Marischal Terrace				55°55′51″N 3°07′15″W	Category B	28103	Upload Photo
Ravelston Dykes Road, Ravelston Tower (Old Ravelston House)				55°57′08″N 3°15′22″W	Category A	28113	Upload Photo
Infirmary Street, University Of Edinburgh Archaeology Department				55°56′55″N 3°11′03″W	Category B	27999	Upload another image
Botanical Gardens Memorial To Sir Charles Linnaeus Arboretum Road And Inverleith Row				55°58′01″N 3°12′27″W	Category A	27916	Upload another image See more images
12 And 13 Wellington Place				55°58′18″N 3°10′09″W	Category C(S)	27925	Upload Photo
Brunstane Bridge Brunstane Road South				55°56′29″N 3°05′56″W	Category B	27939	Upload Photo
Dean Bridge At Queensferry Road				55°57′11″N 3°12′52″W	Category A	27941	Upload Photo
Regent Bridge Carrying Waterloo Place Over Calton Road Including Railings				55°57′13″N 3°11′14″W	Category A	27945	Upload another image
South Bridge, Including Railings				55°56′55″N 3°11′13″W	Category B	27950	Upload Photo
Scotland Street Tunnel Royal Crescent, Foot Of Scotland Street				55°57′38″N 3°11′44″W	Category B	27953	Upload Photo
Union Canal Slateford Aqueduct Over Inglis Green Road And Water Of Leith				55°55′24″N 3°14′59″W	Category B	27958	Upload another image
10 Lasswade Road, Dr Guthrie's School With Boundary Walls, Gatepiers, Gates And War Memorial				55°54′43″N 3°09′32″W	Category B	27970	Upload Photo
1B West Coates, Donaldson's Hospital (School For The Deaf), Including Chapel, Fountain, Steps And Balustrades To Terraces, Pavilions, Boundary Wall, Piers, Railings, Gatepiers, Gates, And Lodges				55°56′50″N 3°13′33″W	Category A	27971	Upload another image See more images
25 Chambers Street, Crown Office (Former Heriot-Watt University)				55°56′51″N 3°11′24″W	Category B	27981	Upload another image
Queen Street And North Charlotte Street, Catherine Sinclair Monument				55°57′11″N 3°12′27″W	Category A	27832	Upload another image See more images
10 Pattison Street				55°58′25″N 3°09′48″W	Category C(S)	27839	Upload Photo
Charlotte Square, Albert Memorial And Walls And Railings Of Garden				55°57′06″N 3°12′28″W	Category A	27840	Upload another image
East Princes Street Gardens, Adam Black Monument				55°57′08″N 3°11′40″W	Category A	27842	Upload another image
East Princes Street Gardens, Livingstone Monument				55°57′09″N 3°11′34″W	Category A	27864	Upload another image See more images
George Street And Frederick Street, Statue Of William Pitt				55°57′11″N 3°12′01″W	Category A	27868	Upload another image
Canongate, Well At Queensberry House				55°57′08″N 3°10′35″W	Category B	27895	Upload another image
18, 19 And 20 Shore Place, Wishart's Warehouse				55°58′29″N 3°10′14″W	Category B	27897	Upload Photo
7 Stead's Place				55°58′05″N 3°10′30″W	Category B	27900	Upload Photo
18 Straiton Place				55°57′12″N 3°06′32″W	Category B	27738	Upload Photo
5 Forrest Hill, University Of Edinburgh, Territorial Army Centre And School Of Artificial Intelligence				55°56′46″N 3°11′31″W	Category B	27773	Upload another image
Ratho Village, 62-64 (Even Nos), Main Street				55°55′19″N 3°22′49″W	Category B	27781	Upload another image
10 And 12 West Brighton Crescent				55°57′06″N 3°07′08″W	Category C(S)	27790	Upload Photo
St Andrew Square, Melville Monument With Boundary Walls And Railings				55°57′15″N 3°11′35″W	Category A	27816	Upload another image See more images
12 Windsor Place, The Post Office				55°57′06″N 3°06′44″W	Category B	27818	Upload Photo
Union Canal, Bridge No 17 (Near Clifton Hall)				55°55′16″N 3°25′31″W	Category B	27824	Upload Photo
15 Rosefield Avenue				55°57′09″N 3°07′01″W	Category B	27671	Upload Photo
Ratho Village, Baird Road (Off), Kirkton Farm Comprising Cottages And Former Maltings				55°55′24″N 3°22′53″W	Category B	27680	Upload Photo
1 Tipperlinn Road And 65 Colinton Road With Boundary Walls And Gatepiers				55°55′53″N 3°12′59″W	Category B	27688	Upload another image
244-252 (Even Nos) Leith Walk				55°57′59″N 3°10′33″W	Category C(S)	27717	Upload Photo
George Iv Bridge And Victoria Street, Edinburgh Central Library Fine Art Department				55°56′55″N 3°11′33″W	Category B	27592	Upload Photo
413-431 Lawnmarket				55°57′00″N 3°11′33″W	Category B	27598	Upload another image
34 Regent Street				55°57′12″N 3°06′43″W	Category C(S)	27618	Upload Photo
5 Belford Road, Hawthornbank Lane, Drumsheugh Baths				55°57′08″N 3°12′59″W	Category A	27621	Upload another image
Newliston House, Walled Garden				55°56′44″N 3°25′39″W	Category B	27627	Upload Photo
Waterloo Place And North Bridge And 10 Calton Road, Waverleygate (Former General Post Office) Including Wall And Lamp Standards				55°57′11″N 3°11′17″W	Category A	27631	Upload another image
48 Regent Street				55°57′14″N 3°06′40″W	Category B	27633	Upload Photo
Princes Street, General Register House With Area Walls And Steps To Front				55°57′13″N 3°11′21″W	Category A	27636	Upload another image
Ransfield Road, Ransfield Farm And Gatepiers				55°55′02″N 3°22′09″W	Category C(S)	27637	Upload Photo
23 Jordan Lane, Whitebank, With Boundary Wall				55°55′39″N 3°12′21″W	Category C(S)	27508	Upload Photo
11 And 13 Regent Street				55°57′10″N 3°06′43″W	Category C(S)	27539	Upload Photo
14, 15, 15A Junction Place, Great Junction Street School With Swimming Baths And Stalk (Also Known As Dr Bell's School)				55°58′19″N 3°10′29″W	Category B	27565	Upload Photo
Kirkliston Village, 3 And 5 (Odd Nos), High Street				55°57′15″N 3°24′02″W	Category C(S)	27467	Upload Photo
Kirkliston Village, 11-13 (Odd Nos), High Street				55°57′15″N 3°24′03″W	Category C(S)	27476	Upload Photo
189-199 (Odd Nos) Great Junction Street And 5 Bangor Road				55°58′25″N 3°10′37″W	Category C(S)	27483	Upload Photo
286 Portobello High Street				55°57′06″N 3°06′34″W	Category C(S)	27500	Upload Photo
5 Greenhill Park With Boundary Wall And Gatepiers				55°56′01″N 3°12′33″W	Category B	27373	Upload Photo
36, 36A 38 (4 Flats), 40 And 40A (Even Nos) Prince Regent Street With Steps And Railings To Front; Eh6 4At				55°58′35″N 3°10′57″W	Category C(S)	27388	Upload Photo
St Luke's Parish Church (C Of S), East Fettes Avenue				55°57′37″N 3°13′12″W	Category B	27414	Upload another image See more images
23-25 South Fort Street, Children's Centre, With Boundary Walls And Railings; Eh6 4Dl				55°58′27″N 3°10′58″W	Category B	27415	Upload Photo
199 And 201 Portobello High Street				55°57′08″N 3°06′49″W	Category C(S)	27418	Upload Photo
Ingliston House (Hq Of Royal Highland And Agricultural Society)				55°56′25″N 3°22′18″W	Category A	27436	Upload Photo
1 Gillsland Road South, Red House				55°55′50″N 3°13′12″W	Category B	27290	Upload Photo
1-7 (Odd Nos) Pitt Street With Railings; Eh6 4Bx				55°58′24″N 3°11′17″W	Category B	27291	Upload Photo
Gogar Station Road, Gogar Bank House, Walled Garden And Bridges				55°55′28″N 3°19′22″W	Category A	27292	Upload Photo
9-13 (Odd Nos) Marlborough Street				55°57′09″N 3°06′40″W	Category C(S)	27301	Upload Photo
84 Constitution Street				55°58′26″N 3°10′05″W	Category B	27330	Upload Photo
Lothian Road, St Cuthbert's Church (Church Of Scotland), Churchyard And Monuments, Boundary Walls Gatepiers And Railings				55°56′59″N 3°12′20″W	Category A	27339	Upload another image
92 Constitution Street And 27 Queen Charlotte Street				55°58′26″N 3°10′05″W	Category A	27344	Upload Photo
11 Greenhill Gardens				55°56′06″N 3°12′22″W	Category C(S)	27345	Upload Photo
Charlotte Square, West Register House (Former St George's Church)				55°57′06″N 3°12′34″W	Category A	27360	Upload another image
20, 22 And 22A Pittville Street				55°57′09″N 3°06′19″W	Category C(S)	27230	Upload Photo
6, 8 And 10 Merchiston Place				55°56′08″N 3°12′39″W	Category B	27231	Upload Photo
12 East Brighton Crescent				55°57′02″N 3°07′01″W	Category B	27247	Upload Photo
Restalrig Road South, Deanery Wall, Between Nos 62A And 64				55°57′28″N 3°08′55″W	Category B	27258	Upload Photo
159 Constitution Street And 23 Laurie Street				55°58′16″N 3°10′13″W	Category C(S)	27264	Upload Photo
77 Promenade Temple Hall Hotel, (Formerly Beachborough Villa), Including Hall, Boundary Walls And Railings				55°57′02″N 3°06′01″W	Category B	27278	Upload Photo
47 Figgate Lane				55°57′20″N 3°06′47″W	Category C(S)	27280	Upload Photo
George Street, St Andrew's And St George's Church With Railings And Lamp Standards				55°57′15″N 3°11′45″W	Category A	27283	Upload another image
6 St Mary's Place With Boundary Walls And Gatepiers				55°56′58″N 3°06′15″W	Category C(S)	27286	Upload Photo
16 And 16A Napier Road With Boundary Walls And Railings				55°56′03″N 3°13′03″W	Category C(S)	27287	Upload Photo
4 And 6 Merchiston Crescent				55°56′06″N 3°12′51″W	Category B	27171	Upload another image
57/57B Constitution Street And 49 And 51/1 And 2 Mitchell Street, Former Leith Post Office				55°58′28″N 3°10′02″W	Category B	27174	Upload Photo
Glasgow Road, Norton House Hotel				55°55′57″N 3°23′02″W	Category B	27178	Upload Photo
1 Craigentinny Crescent				55°57′24″N 3°08′13″W	Category C(S)	27182	Upload Photo
4 And 4A Merchiston Park				55°56′09″N 3°12′44″W	Category C(S)	27189	Upload Photo
3C Craigentinny Crescent, Craigentinny Marbles (The William Henry Miller Mausoleum)				55°57′26″N 3°08′14″W	Category A	27191	Upload another image
6 And 6A Merchiston Park				55°56′09″N 3°12′44″W	Category C(S)	27198	Upload Photo
67 Colinton Road, George Watson's College, Music School				55°55′47″N 3°12′57″W	Category B	27202	Upload Photo
30 And 32 Brighton Place				55°57′07″N 3°07′00″W	Category B	27125	Upload Photo
3 Pittville Street (Abercorn House)				55°57′05″N 3°06′27″W	Category C(S)	27130	Upload Photo
14-16 Abinger Gardens And Ormidale Terrace, Murrayfield Parish Church (Church Of Scotland)				55°56′46″N 3°14′26″W	Category B	27148	Upload Photo
Holy Cross, Church Of The (Episcopal) Quality Street And East Barnton Avenue Davidson's Mains				55°57′54″N 3°16′29″W	Category B	27039	Upload Photo
35 Brighton Place St John The Evangelist (Roman Catholic Church)				55°57′06″N 3°06′55″W	Category A	27046	Upload Photo
3 Carpet Lane And 42 The Shore (Donaldson's Warehouse)				55°58′33″N 3°10′09″W	Category A	27078	Upload Photo
Chamberlain Road, Tomb Of John Livingstone				55°56′04″N 3°12′22″W	Category C(S)	26960	Upload Photo

== Key ==
The scheme for classifying buildings in Scotland is:

- Category A: "buildings of national or international importance, either architectural or historic; or fine, little-altered examples of some particular period, style or building type."
- Category B: "buildings of regional or more than local importance; or major examples of some particular period, style or building type, which may have been altered."
- Category C: "buildings of local importance; lesser examples of any period, style, or building type, as originally constructed or moderately altered; and simple traditional buildings which group well with other listed buildings."

In March 2016 there were 47,288 listed buildings in Scotland. Of these, 8% were Category A, and 50% were Category B, with the remaining 42% being Category C.

== See also ==
- List of listed buildings in Edinburgh
