= Canongate Tolbooth =

Historic building in Edinburgh, Scotland

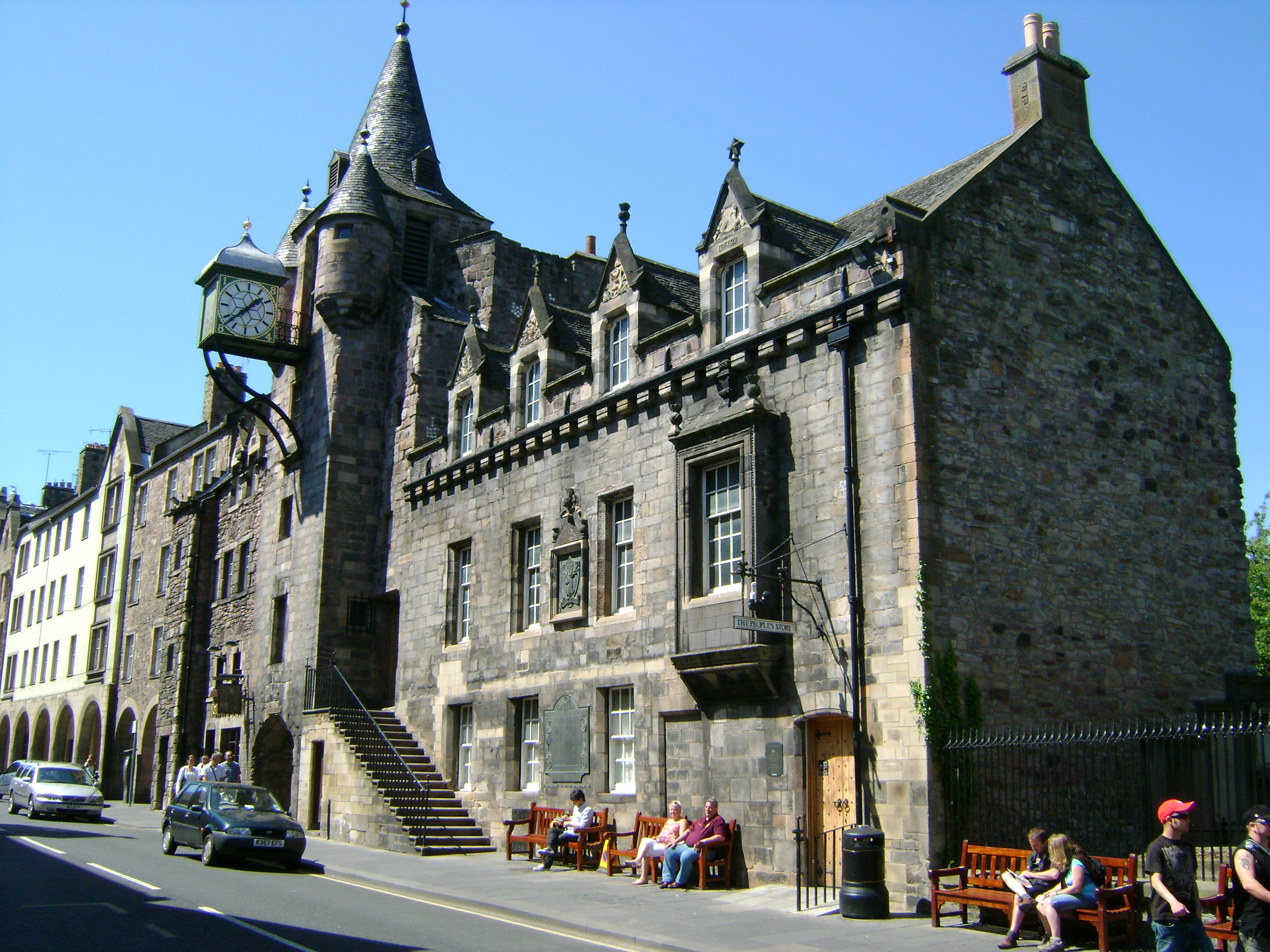
- Canongate Tolbooth

- Shown in Edinburgh
- 55.9515°N 3.1800°W
- Location: Old Town, Edinburgh

History
- Built: 1591

Site notes
- Architectural style: Scottish medieval style

Listed Building – Category A
- Official name: 163 Canongate, Canongate Tolbooth
- Designated: 14 December 1970
- Reference no.: LB27582

Canongate Tolbooth is a historic landmark of the Old Town area of Edinburgh, built in 1591 as a tolbooth, that is, the centre of administration and justice of the then separate burgh of the Canongate which was outside the Edinburgh town walls. It ceased to be a municipal building in 1856 and it is now occupied by The People's Story Museum and is protected as a category A listed building.

== History ==
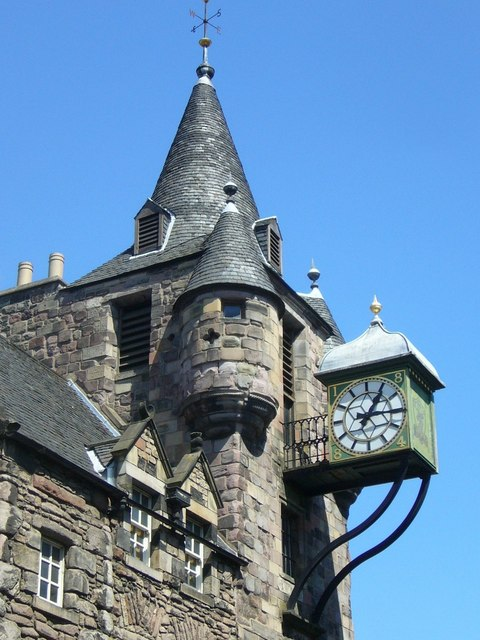
The clock with bartizans to either side and the conical spire

The tower of the tolbooth was built in 1591, and the block to the east of it at that time or slightly after, by Sir Lewis Bellenden, baron of Broughton and feudal superior of the burgh of Canongate and Lord Justice Clerk of Scotland. It served as the courthouse, burgh jail and meeting place of the town council.

Many Covenanters were held in the tolbooth in poor conditions in the 17th century and a riot took place in the building in May 1692. It ceased to be the meeting place of the burgh council when Canongate was annexed by Edinburgh in 1856.

In 1875 the City Architect, Robert Morham, extensively restored and remodelled the exterior. Internally the first and attic floors were combined to make a single floor, now The People's Story Museum.

== Design ==
The tolbooth was designed in the Scottish medieval style: it comprises a bell tower with a lower block to the east that contained the council chamber and courtroom. The tower has two bartizans with ornamental gunloops on either side of a clock, dated 1884 and manufactured by James Ritchie & Son, which is suspended over the Royal Mile by wrought iron brackets. Above the bartizans is a conical spire while at street level there is a round-arched pend that leads into Tolbooth Wynd. Architectural features of the east block include a stone forestair which leads to a door next to the tower, an oriel window, and four pedimented dormers by Morham, based on Gordon of Rothiemay's map of 1647, that replaced three piended ones.

To the east of the tolbooth, down the Royal Mile, is the Kirk of the Canongate and the Canongate Kirkyard.
