= Witches' Well =

Monument to accused witches in Edinburgh

Coordinates: 55°56′56″N 3°11′47″W

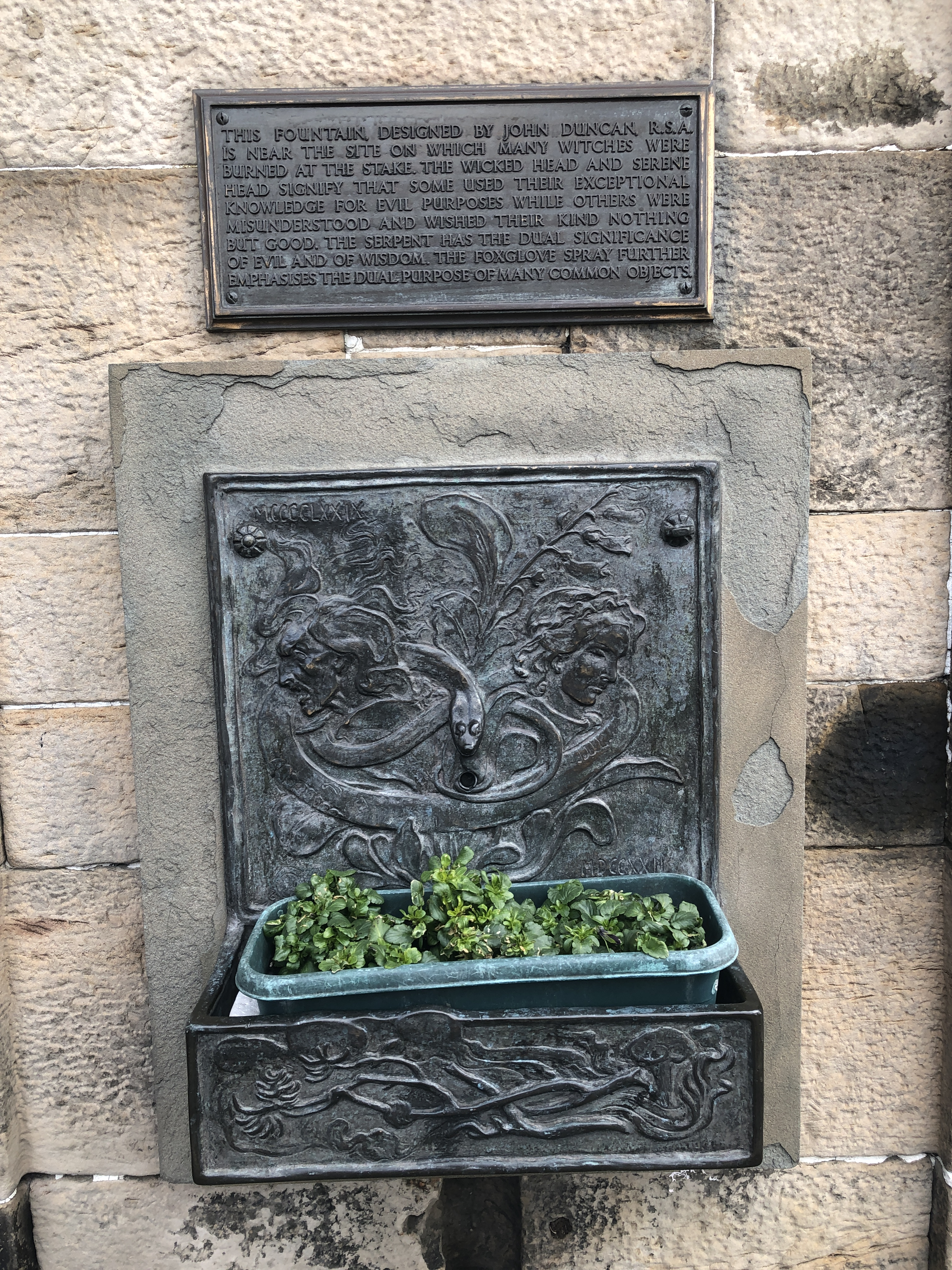
- Interactive map of Witches' Well
- Location: Castle Esplanade, Edinburgh, Scotland
- Designer: John Duncan (painter)
- Material: Bronze
- Dedicated to: Witches burned at the stake nearby during the period 1479–1722

Listed Building – Category B
- Official name: 555 Castlehill, Former Reservoir, with Retaining Wall, Steps, Railings and Balustrade to N and Drinking Fountain on W Wall
- Designated: 13 August 1987
- Reference no.: LB27962

The Witches' Well is a monument to accused witches burned at the stake in Edinburgh, Scotland, and is the only one of its kind in the city.

The memorial drinking fountain is attached to a wall at the lower end of the Castle Esplanade, below Edinburgh Castle, and located close to where many people accused of witchcraft were burned at the stake. During the high point of witch hunting in the early modern period, 32% of accused witches came from the Lothian area.

== Design and history ==
The well was commissioned by Sir Patrick Geddes in 1894, and designed by Geddes' friend John Duncan. The bronze relief features a foxglove plant, a snake curled around the heads of Hygeia, the Greek goddess of good health, and her father Aesculapius, god of medicine. Other parts of the well feature trees, healing hands, and the evil eye. The water spout, now dry, is located beneath the snake's head. In the top left and bottom right are the Roman numerals for the years 1479 and 1722 respectively, the time period during which most witches were persecuted in Scotland. The model for the Well is held by the City Art Centre in Edinburgh.

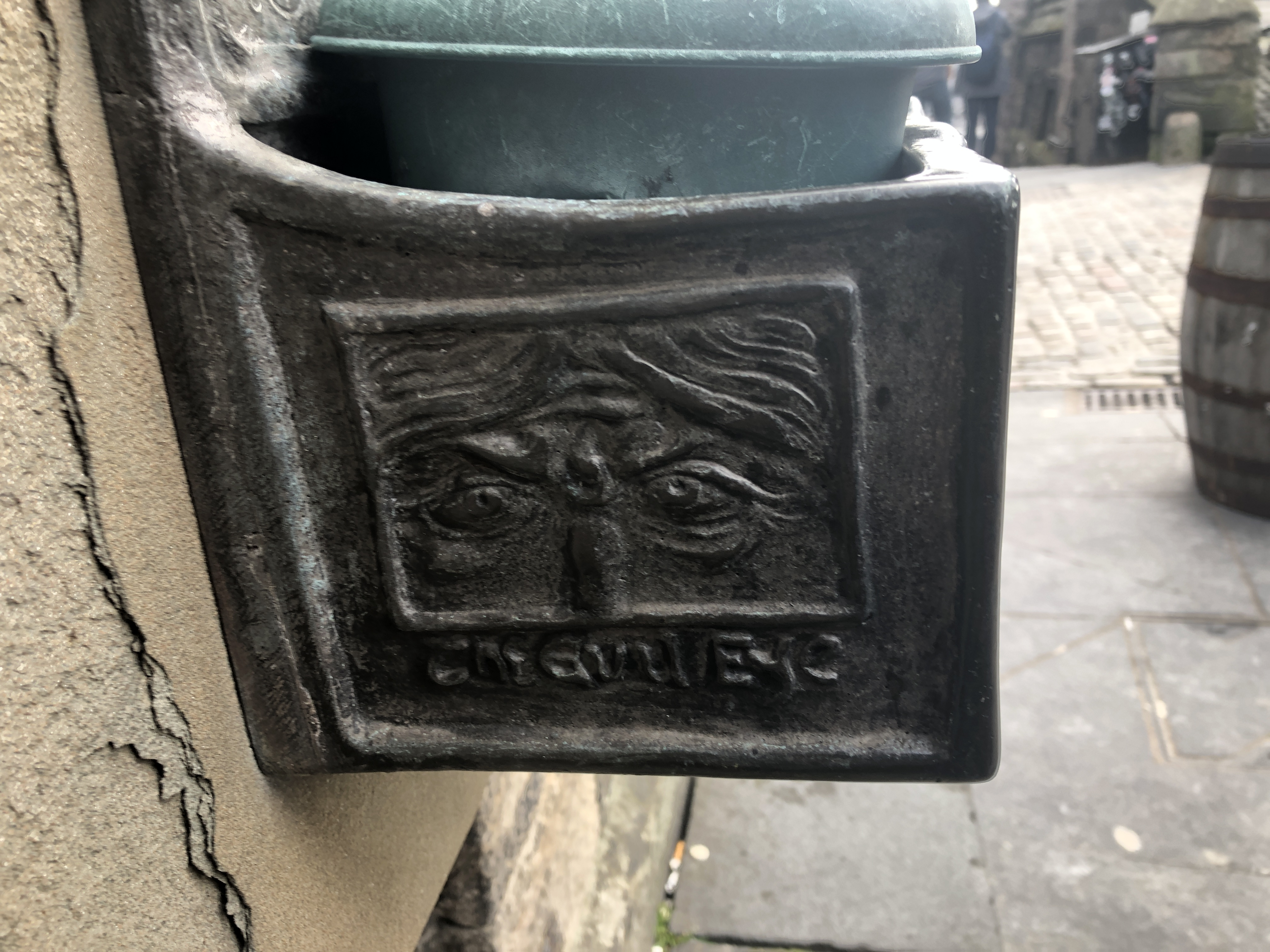
Evil eye detail

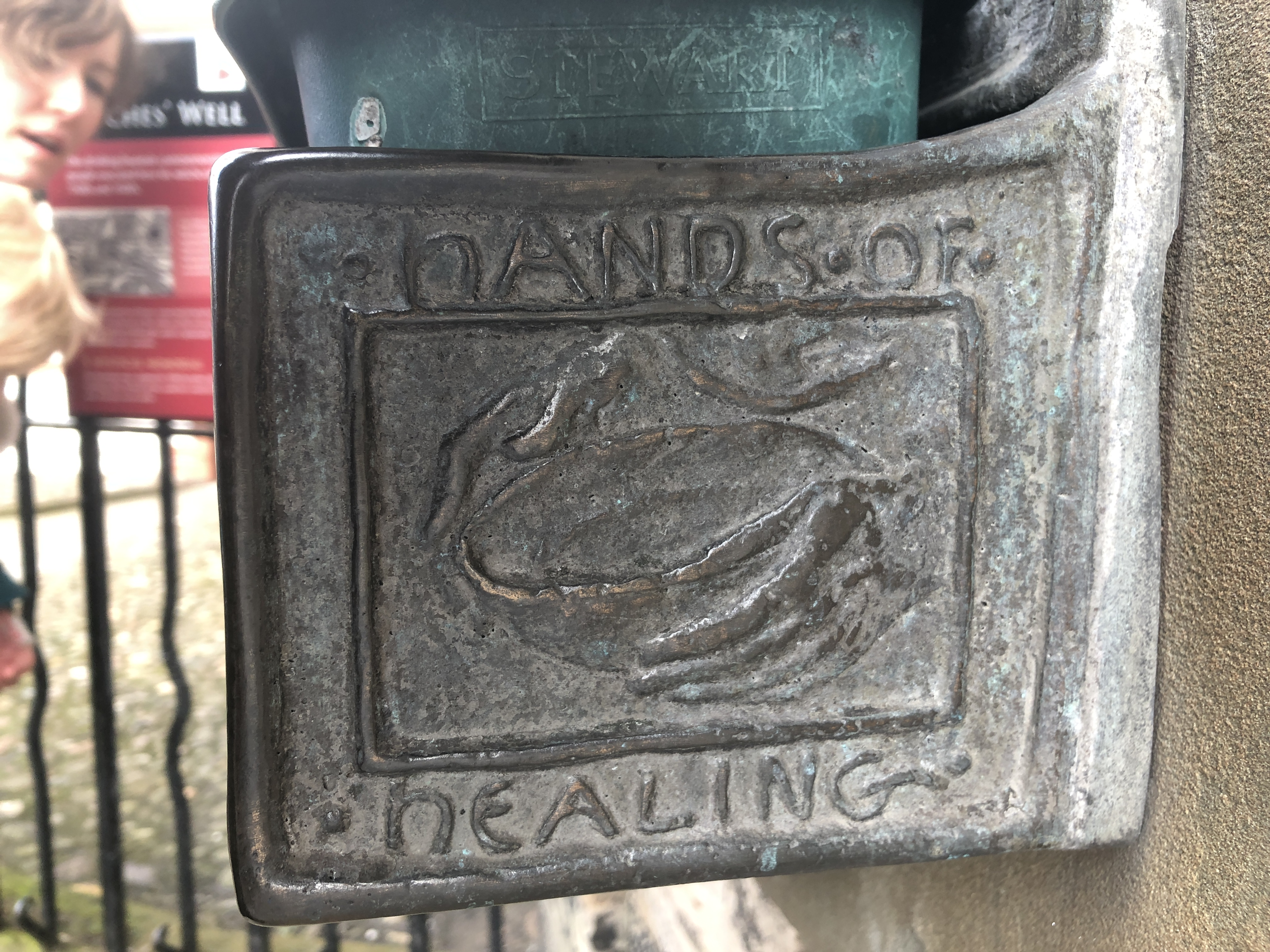
Hands of healing detail

The building upon which it is affixed (now containing the Tartan Weaving Mill) was built in 1851, for the Castlehill Reservoir. The 1851 building replaced its 17th-century predecessor, constructed when act of parliament in 1624 enabled the bringing of fresh water into the city from the nearby Pentland Hills. In 1674 the reservoir was connected to 12 wells around the city, eventually closing in 1992, and converted into the Tartan Mill in 1996.

There have been repeated calls for a newer, permanent memorial to those accused as witches. In 2016, Edinburgh World Heritage called for a new memorial for Edinburgh, and in 2017, Professor Julian Goodare of the University of Edinburgh and Professor Lynn Abrams of the University of Glasgow called for a new memorial for Scotland. In 2019 those calls were repeated by Prof. Goodare and Louise Yeoman, as directors of the Survey of Scottish Witchcraft.

== Plaque and inscription ==
The plaque above the fountain was mounted on the wall in 1912. The inscription reads:

This fountain, designed by John Duncan, R.S.A. is near the site on which many witches were burned at the stake. The wicked head and serene head signify that some used their exceptional knowledge for evil purposes while others were misunderstood and wished their kind nothing but good. The serpent has the dual significance of evil and wisdom. The foxglove spray further emphasises the dual purpose of many common objects.

The inscription has been criticised for historical inaccuracy, in the assumption that those killed had magical powers.
