= Justiciary Building, Edinburgh =

Judicial building in Edinburgh, Scotland

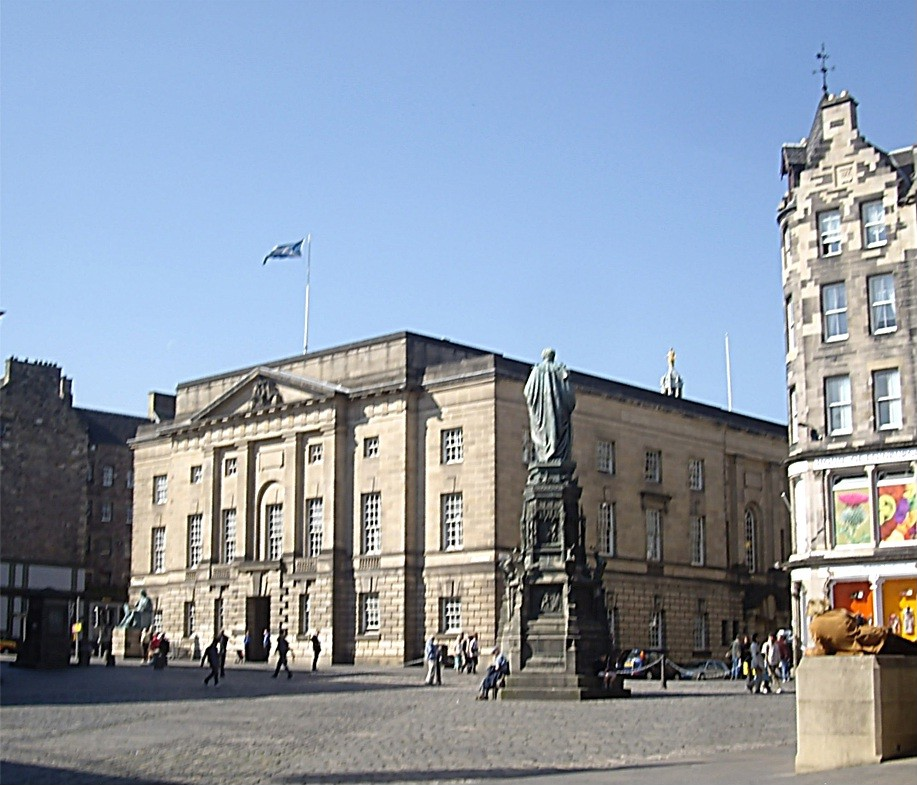
- Justiciary Building, Edinburgh

- Shown in Edinburgh
- 55.9498°N 3.1924°W
- Location: Lawnmarket, Edinburgh

History
- Built: 1937

Site notes
- Architect(s): Albert Pitcher and John Wilson Paterson
- Architectural style: Neo-Georgian style

Listed Building – Category B
- Official name: High Court (Former Sheriff Court), 413-431 Lawnmarket, Edinburgh
- Designated: 13 August 1987
- Reference no.: LB27598

The Justiciary Building is a court building in the Lawnmarket in Edinburgh, Scotland. It houses the High Court of Justiciary, which is the supreme criminal court in Scotland, and operates in conjunction with similar facilities in Glasgow and Aberdeen. It is a Category B listed building.

== History ==
The first criminal justice building in Edinburgh was the old tolbooth which was located in the Old Town and was completed in about 1400. After the tolbooth became inadequate, sheriff court hearings were transferred to the old county hall which had been built to a design by Archibald Elliot on the corner of the Lawnmarket and George IV Bridge in 1816. (Note: Lothian Chambers now occupies this site.)

The first dedicated Sheriff Court Building was established further to the southeast along George IV Bridge: it was designed by David Bryce in the Renaissance Revival style, built in ashlar stone and was completed in 1868. Bryce's building was demolished to make way for the National Library of Scotland in 1937.

The current building was commissioned as a new Sheriff Court Building to replace Bryce's building on George IV Bridge. It was designed by Albert Pitcher and John Wilson Paterson of HM Office of Works in the Neo-Georgian style, built in ashlar stone and was completed in 1937. The design involved a symmetrical main frontage with seven bays facing onto the Lawnmarket. The central section of three bays, which was projected forward, featured an entrance with a large keystone on the ground floor, a recessed round headed window on the first floor and a blind panel on the second floor. The other bays were fenestrated by square sash windows on the ground floor, tall sash windows on the first floor and square sash windows on the second floor. The first floor windows in the central section were flanked by huge Doric order pilasters supporting an frieze with triglyphs and guttae as well as a pediment containing a carved figure of justice. Internally, the principal rooms were a large marble-lined entrance hall and a series of courtrooms.

After the Sheriff Court moved to the new courthouse in Chambers Street in September 1994, the building was extensively remodelled to a design by David le Sueur to accommodate the High Court of Justiciary, which is the supreme criminal court in Scotland. A wall hanging designed by Alice Kettle was installed at the top of the staircase, and a statue to commemorate the life of the Scottish Enlightenment philosopher, David Hume, was carved by Alexander Stoddart and unveiled outside the building by the Principal of the University of Edinburgh, Sir Stewart Sutherland, on 21 November 1997.

== See also ==
- List of listed buildings in Edinburgh/29
