= Tartan Weaving Mill =

Tourist attraction in Edinburgh, Scotland

The Tartan Weaving Mill

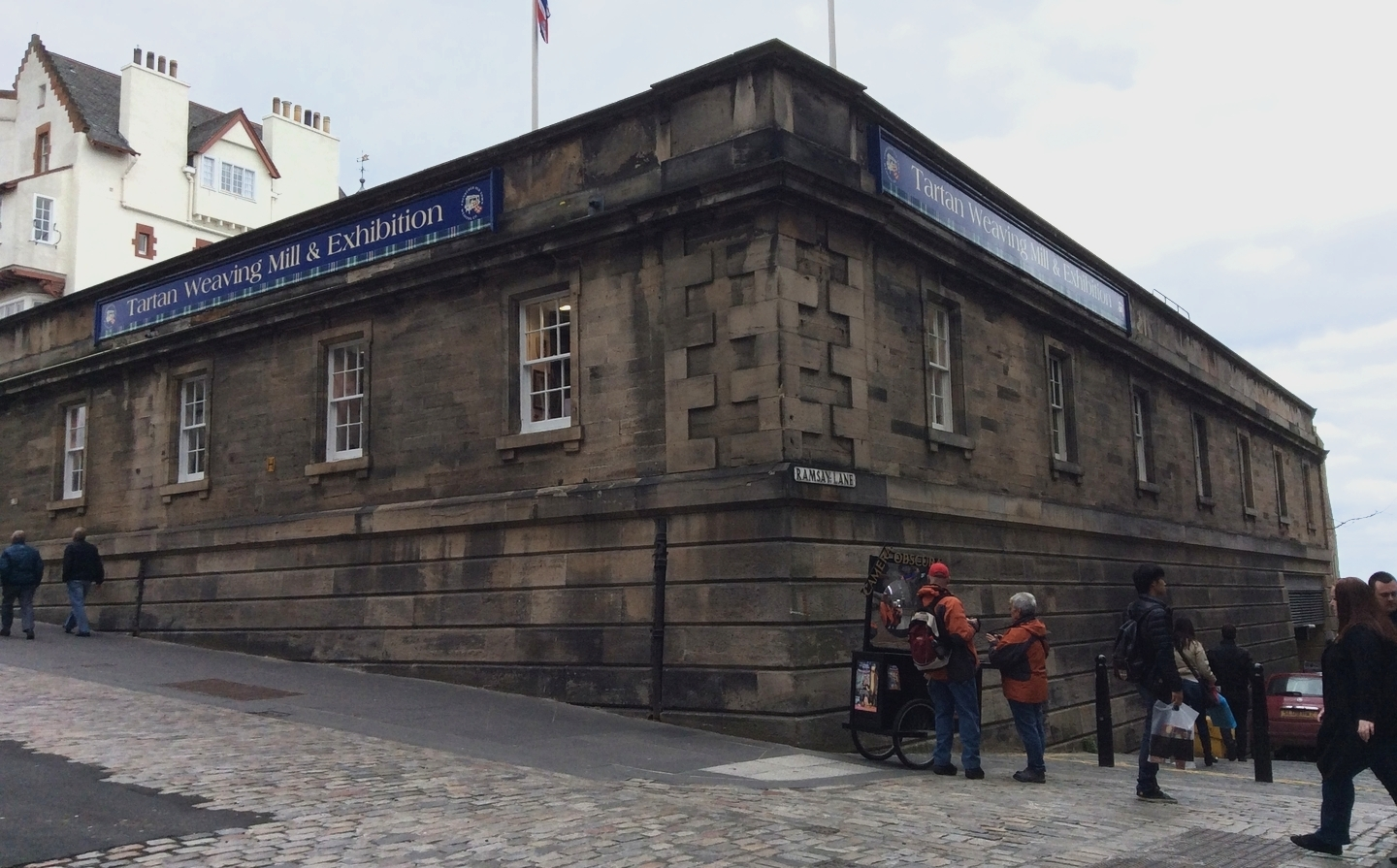
- The Tartan Weaving Mill viewed from the Royal Mile

- Location within Edinburgh city centre

General information
- Location: 555 Castlehill, Royal Mile, Edinburgh EH1 2NF, Scotland, United Kingdom
- Coordinates: 55.9490°N 3.1961°W
- Opened: 1850 (as reservoir); 1997 (as attraction)
- Renovated: 1995-97
- Owner: GL Attractions

Technical details
- Floor count: 5

Design and construction
- Known for: Live weaving demonstrations

Other information
- Public transit: Edinburgh Waverley

Website
- www.thetartanweavingmill.co.uk

Listed Building – Category B
- Official name: 555 Castlehill, Former Reservoir, with Retaining Wall, Steps, Railings and Balustrade to N and Drinking Fountain on W Wall
- Designated: 13 August 1987
- Reference no.: LB27962

The Tartan Weaving Mill is a retail store, cafe and visitor attraction on the Royal Mile in the Old Town of Edinburgh, Scotland. It is located on the Castlehill, directly adjacent to the esplanade of Edinburgh Castle. The attraction occupies a former city reservoir, which was drained in 1992 and converted to its current use in 1995.

In addition to its retail use, the attraction contains a display dedicated to tartan and weaving, as well as a heritage loom, on display in the bottom floor of the building. Visitors can see the equipment on show in the workshop, with occasional live demonstrations. The Witches' Well fountain is attached to the exterior of the Tartan Weaving Mill building.

== History ==
The Tartan Weaving Mill occupies the hollow basement of the former Castlehill Reservoir building, built between 1849-50. The site had previously been the site of a smaller reservoir (built circa 1755) and prior to that, a chapel called the Christ Church (which was demolished to provide materials for the construction of the Tron Kirk). The reservoir fed directly to the houses of the Old Town and was capable of distributing 2 million gallons of water at a rate of 5,000 gallons per minute. Human remains were discovered during the reservoir's construction, as well as a number of black coffins made from oak.

The reservoir was drained in 1992, with the intent to seek a new usage for the site. In between the reservoir's draining and redevelopment, the interior of the building was opened to the public as part of the 1993 Doors Open Days festival.

After a public competition for development proposals, during which fifteen applications were received, the building was sold by Lothian Regional Council to G & L Investments for conversion into the current attraction. The company operated an existing craft store on the High Street and an existing weaving operation in Peffermill, Craigmillar. After concerns were raised to the Scotsman that the attraction would be of low quality, the company Director, Geoffrey Nicholsby, told the newspaper "Our intention is to make Castlehill Reservoir into an Edinburgh Landmark, with something for tourists, local people, employment and education alike... the retail shop will sell products of the highest quality."

The new venture was known as the Old Town Weaving Company. After a period of renovation and recruitment, the attraction opened in June 1997. Visitors to the attraction could pick a tartan and watch it being made by the attraction's staff, or experience working the mill and making tartan themselves.

The Singh Gold family took ownership of the building in 2007 after purchasing GL Attractions for £6 million. A two-year court battle ensued over the terms of the lease, which was won by former Director Nicholsby in 2010. The family were found to have retailed inferior-quality imported Highlandwear in the Tartan Weaving Mill, and Malap Singh was separately convicted of assault on Nicholsby. The Singh Gold family subsequently purchased the Old Town Weaving Company, which still operated the lower-floor weaving workshop, in February 2014.

In 2025, an employee of the Tartan Weaving Mill was awarded damages after suing the company for constructive dismissal.

== Future ==
In 2024, the operators of the building applied to City of Edinburgh Council for planning permission to redevelop the attraction as a heritage experience. The proposed experience would explore the building's history as a reservoir and the importance of water to Edinburgh's development, as well as housing an exhibition on kilts and creating new spaces for independent traders. The plans also proposed construction of an alternative entrance to the building on Ramsay Lane, to improve flow of visitors through the attraction.

The proposal was approved on 22 October 2024, with the displays on the history of the reservoir drawing from the work of Roland Paxton, Professor of Civil Engineering at Heriot-Watt University.
