= The People's Story Museum =

Museum in City of Edinburgh, Scotland

The People's Story Museum opened in 1989 and is housed in a building dating from 1591 known as Canongate Tolbooth. Located at the foot of the Royal Mile in Edinburgh, Scotland, this museum provides oral history, written sources and reminiscence to narrate the story of the lives of those who lived in Edinburgh from the late 18th century onwards. In narrating this story, the museum uses visual representation with reconstructions of a jail cell, various tradesmen's workshops, a 1940s kitchen, wash house, public house and tea rooms. The Labour Party pledged in a local election to show history from a bottom-up perspective rather than the typical narrative told by elite institutions such as the bank, the law and other elite institutions.

== Life in tenement houses in the 18th century ==
The picture on the right is the first display which can be viewed upon entering The People's Story Museum. This is a family of three who spent their life in Edinburgh in the late 18th century. Below is listed the average traits and health issues they faced in their daily life.

Alexander Ross, his wife Katherine, their daughter Janet and the neighbours baby

ALEXANDER- Aged around 30 years old, was tasked with the role of cleaning the streets for the town council and earned 6 shillings a week. He worked 60-80 hours weekly, and he was unable to protest about this due to there being no trade unions at this time.

KATHERINE- Aged around 25 years old, part time spunk (fire-lighter) seller, sells spunk for 3 a penny and is looking after the baby of a neighbour who has a fever. She has no regular hours within her role

JANET- Aged 7 and is the second of three children, she is unable to go to school due to the lack of money her parents earn and there are too few charity schools for her to be able to attend.

HEALTH ISSUES- This family would have experienced fevers, dysentery, bronchitis, likelihood of death from smallpox, measles, childbirth and consumption (tuberculosis).

This families rent was £2 yearly and they lived in a one bedroom tenement on the 5th floor

== Edinburgh People Take to the Streets ==
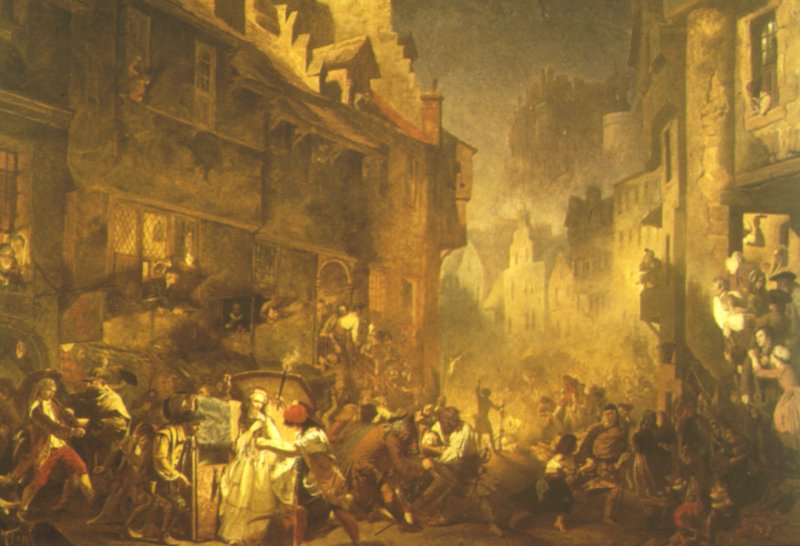
The Porteous Mob by James Drummond

On the 7th of September 1736 a mob of thousands stormed the Tolbooth and dragged a man from his cell to hang him in Grassmarket.The man that they killed Captain Porteous, former head of the Edinburgh City Guard, incinerated for the killing of civilians months earlier.

Anti-Catholic riots were not unknown with the rising prices of food many granaries and distilleries were attacked. These riots were inspired by French Revolutionary ideals and political change was demanded.

Meal mobs protested against the Corn Laws which kept grain prices high. Handbills were circulated and placards which demanded reform were nailed to walls in June 1792. Instead of celebrating the King's birthday during this time, the crowd stoned troops and officials. These protests continued with the figure of Home Secretary, Henry Dundas, was burned and the mob attacked the houses of the Lord advocate and the Lord Provost.

Additionally there was a protest in 1797 against forced military service ended in tragedy. In Tranent innocent bystanders including children were shot and stabbed by soldiers instructed to quell the riots. The Massacre of Tranent failed to prevent further disturbances in Edinburgh in 1800 and 1801.

=== The People's Hero ===
Maurice Margarot, Joseph Gerrald and William Skirving, leaders of the Third National Convention for parliamentary reform were arrested, charged with sedition and sentenced to fourteen years transportation. Margarot was popular with the Edinburgh mob who escorted him to and from the High Court.

=== A Soldier of the Town Guard ===
Jan Dhu whose Gaelic name means "Black John" was born in Badenoch and joined the town guard after serving as a soldier of the Black Watch in America and Flanders. He was a strong feared Guard who rose to the rank of corporal. At the time of the French Revolution he killed a member of the Edinburgh mob with one blow during a riot. His axe was a Lochaber axe which was the usual weapon which members of the Guard carried.

== Collections ==
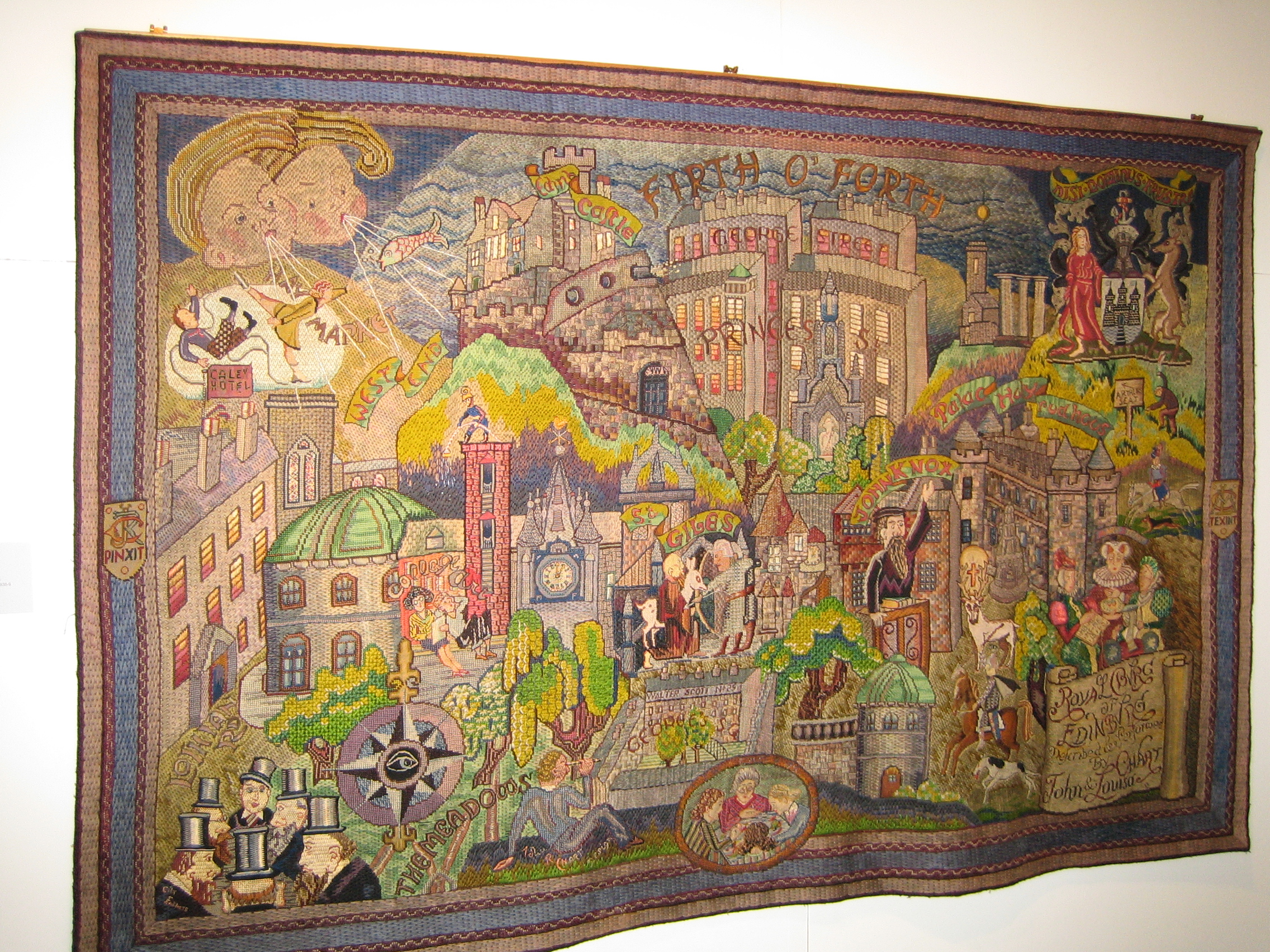
One of the banners in the museum's collection.

The museum houses Britain's largest collection of early reform flags and banners, totaling 144 in all. These banners encompass various themes, including support for political reform, trade unions, and the anti-apartheid movement. Additionally, the museum features waxworks that vividly illustrate the written histories of the people of Edinburgh.

== Galleries ==
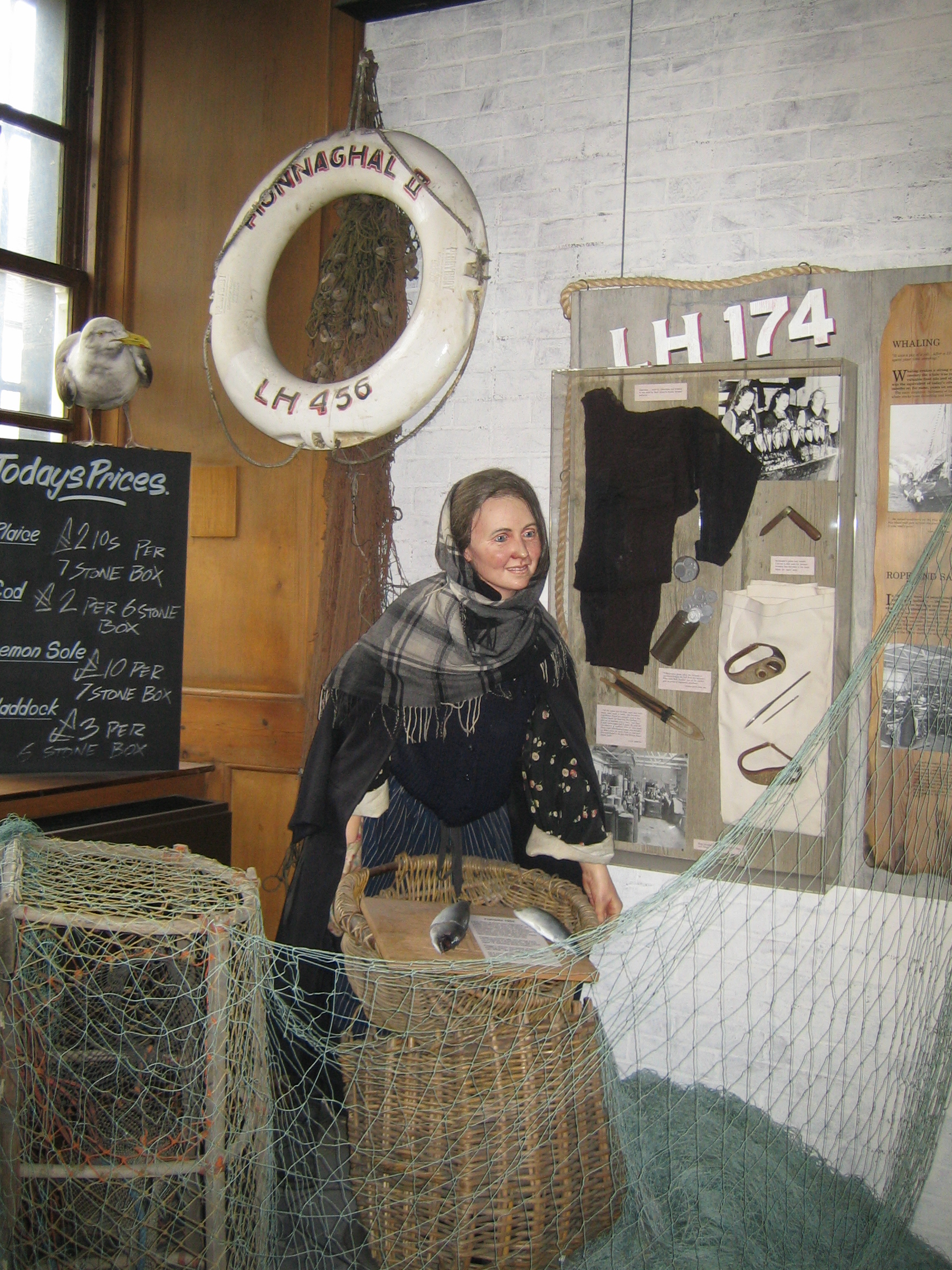
Part of a waxwork display in the museum.

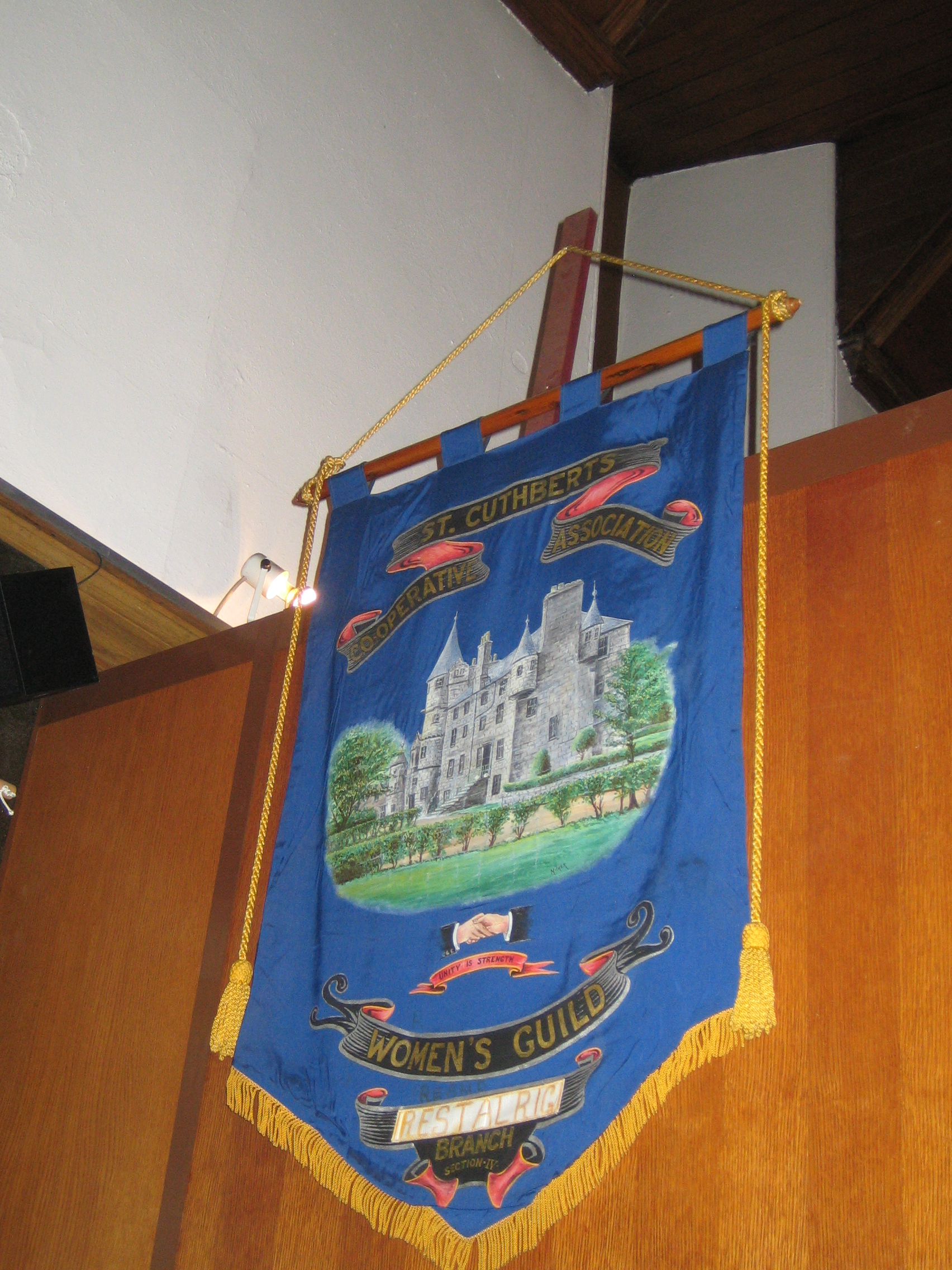
A banner on display in the museum, part of its 144-strong collection.

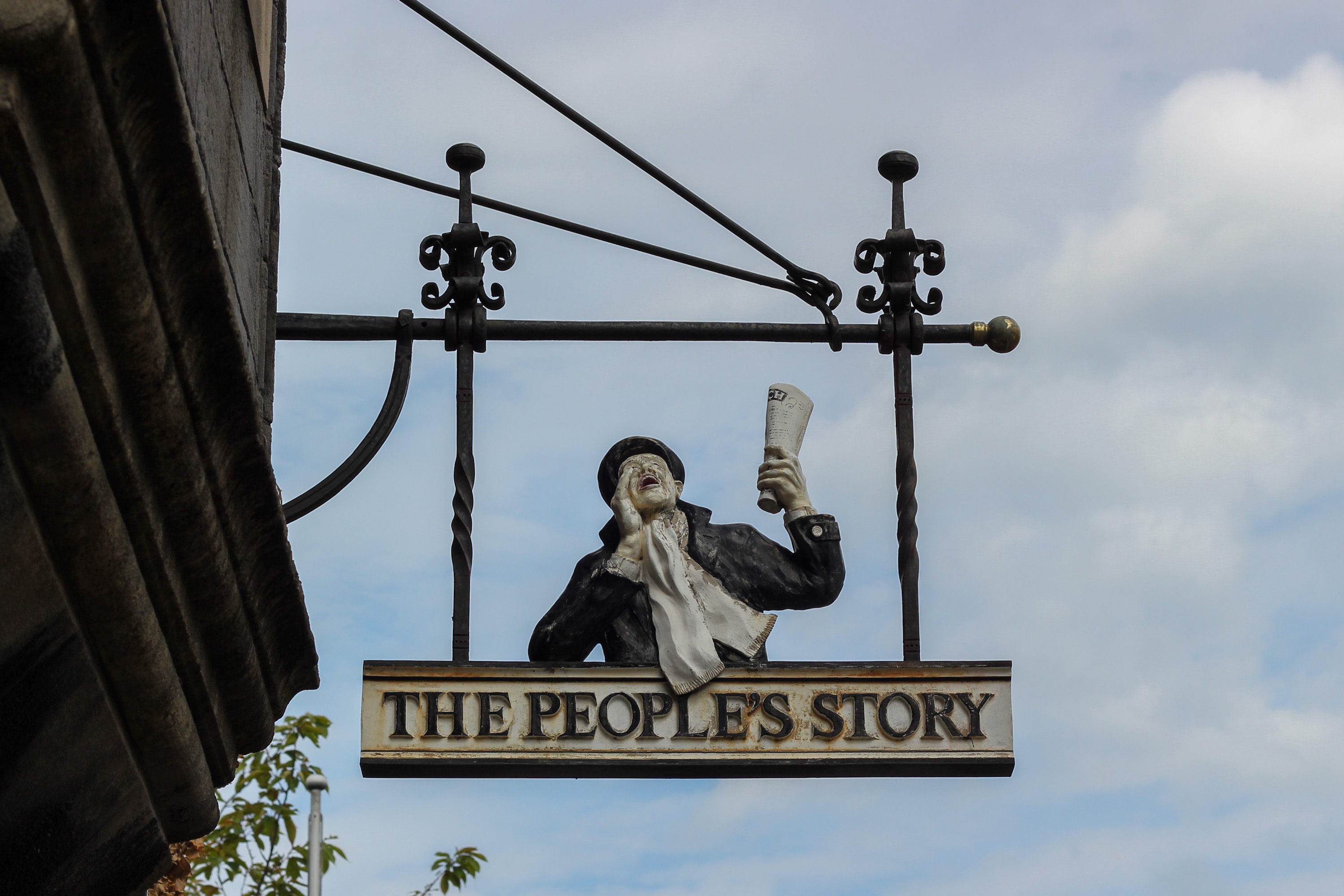
Sign outside the People's Story Museum

There are three galleries and a film screening room in the museum. The first gallery looks at life in tenement houses in the 18th century. The second gallery showcases numerous banners from the museum's collection and recounts the stories of Edinburgh citizens in the 20th century, through waxworks and written histories. The final galleries depict Edinburgh in the mid- to late-20th century.

The film in the screening room shows personal stories of four Edinburgh citizens who grew up in the city and worked in the printing and building trades, in a co-op store, and as a servant.
