= Royal Mile =

Collection of streets in Edinburgh

Coordinates: 55°57′02″N 3°11′08″W

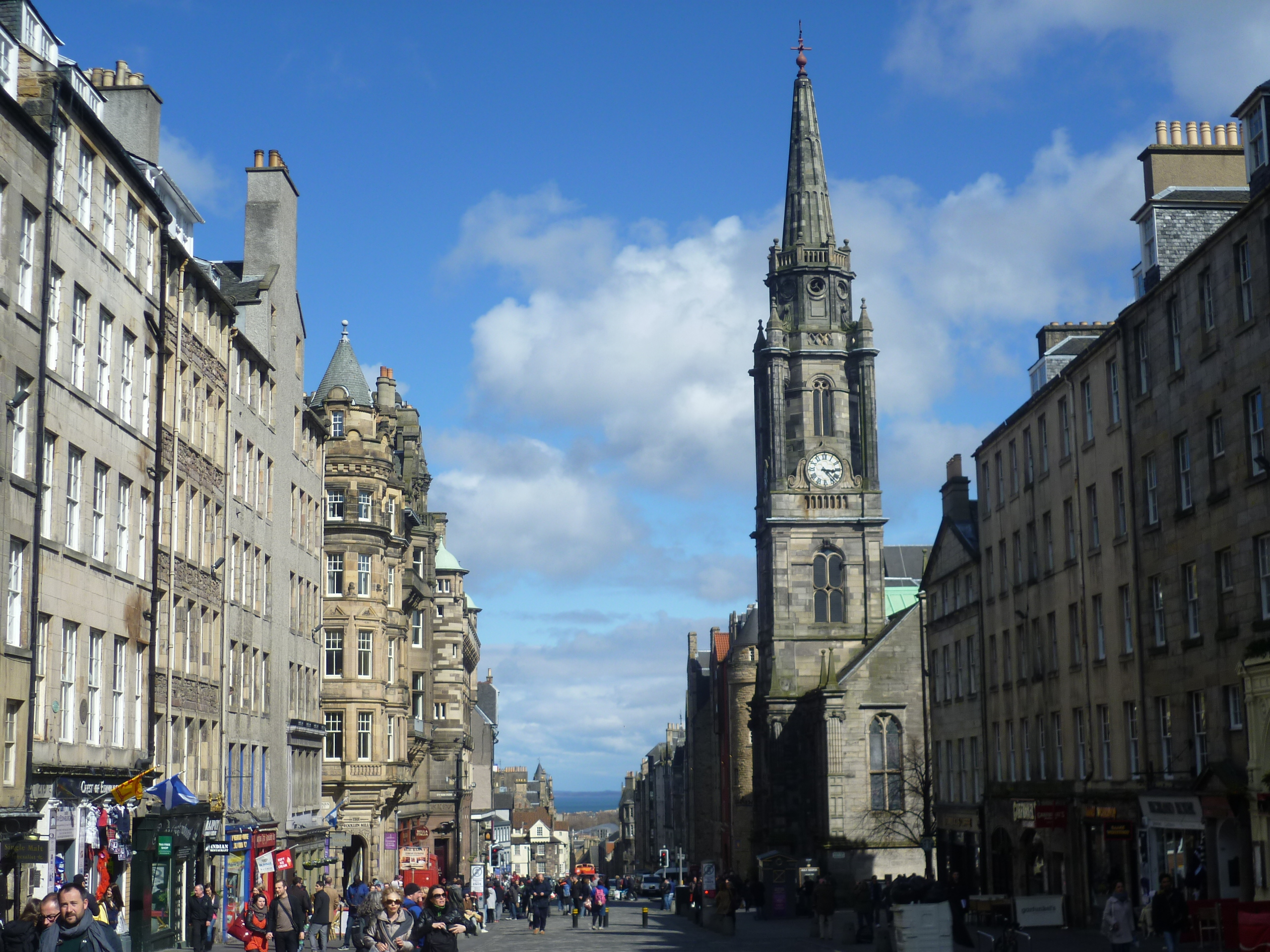
- View looking east down the Royal Mile past the Tron Kirk
- Interactive map of Royal Mile
- Type: Commercial
- Length: 1.000 mi (1.609 km)
- Location: Edinburgh
- Postal code: EH1
- Nearest metro station: Waverley

The Royal Mile (Scottish Gaelic: Am Mìle Rìoghail) is a series of streets forming the main thoroughfare of the Old Town of Edinburgh, Scotland. The term originated in the early 20th century and has since entered popular usage.

The Royal Mile runs between Edinburgh Castle and Holyrood Palace, two significant locations in the royal history of Scotland, and is almost exactly one mile long. From west to east, and running downhill, it comprises the Castle Esplanade and the public streets of Castlehill, the Lawnmarket, the High Street, the Canongate and Abbey Strand. It is the busiest tourist street in the Old Town.

The Royal Mile contains shops, restaurants, public houses, and visitor attractions. During the annual Edinburgh Fringe, the High Street becomes crowded with tourists, entertainers, and buskers. Parliament Square is at the heart of Scotland's legal system, being the home of both the High Court of Justiciary and the Court of Session.

== Geography ==
Video of the Royal Mile, Edinburgh

Retreating ice sheets, many millennia ago, deposited their glacial debris behind the hard volcanic plug of the castle rock on which Edinburgh Castle stands, resulting in a distinctive crag and tail formation. Running eastwards from the crag on which the castle sits, the Royal Mile sits upon the ridge of the tail which slopes gently down to Holyrood Palace. Steep closes (or alleyways) run between the many tall lands (or tenement buildings) off the main thoroughfare. The route runs from an elevation of 138 feet (42 m) above sea level at the palace to 358 feet (109 m) at the castle, giving an average gradient of 4.1%.

== Castle Esplanade ==
Originally part of the Castle Hill (the hill leading to the castle which sits on the Castle Rock) the Castle Esplanade was laid out as a parade ground in 1753, using spoil from the building of the Royal Exchange (now the City Chambers). It was formalised in 1816 when it was widened and provided with decorative railings and walls. The Esplanade with its several monuments has been Category A-listed by Historic Scotland. It is the venue of the annual Edinburgh Military Tattoo, when temporary grandstands are erected.

== Castlehill ==
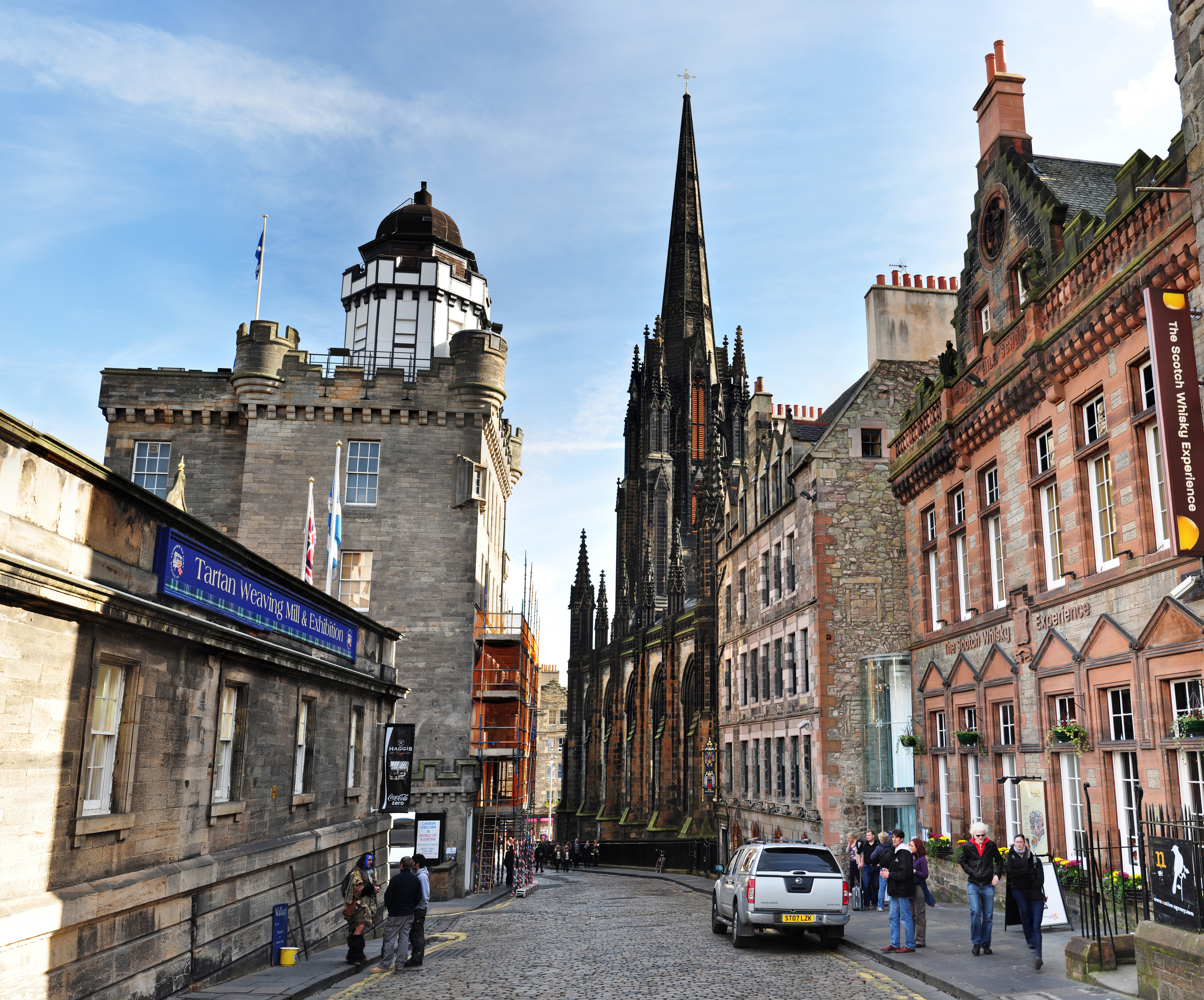
Castlehill forming part of the Royal Mile. The former Victorian church houses The Hub, an information service for the Edinburgh International Festival. On the right is The Scotch Whisky Experience and on the left the Camera Obscura tower and shops.

Due to its location immediately east of the castle, the street known as Castlehill was probably the earliest developed part of the Old Town of Edinburgh. Travelling east from the Castle Esplanade, the first building on the right is Cannonball House which has a cannonball lodged in the wall facing the Esplanade, often said to have been accidentally fired from the Castle but which actually marks the elevation of Comiston Springs, three miles to the south of the Castle, which fed a cistern of c.1755 on Castlehill, one of the first piped water supplies in Scotland. This is indicated as "A" on Edgar's 1765 map.

Castlehill is dominated by the former Tolbooth-Highland-St John's Church (on the south side at the foot of this section), now the headquarters of the Edinburgh International Festival society – the Hub which, at 74 metres high at its tip, is the third tallest building in Edinburgh. Due to its elevated location together with the height of its spire, it is the highest structure above sea level in the centre of Edinburgh. Other notable buildings are the former Castlehill School building, now the Scotch Whisky Experience, and on the north side the Outlook Tower and Camera Obscura. The Assembly Hall of the Church of Scotland and New College are further down on the same side. The Scottish Parliament met in the Assembly Hall between 1999 and 2004.

== Lawnmarket ==
The Lawnmarket is a separately named part of the High Street. Addresses are a continuation of the High Street numbers. It runs from the Upper Bow to St Giles Street.

A charter of 1477 designated this part of the High Street as the market-place for what was called "inland merchandise" – items such as yarn, stockings, coarse cloth and other similar articles. In later years, linen was the main product sold. As a result, it became known as the Land Market which was later corrupted to Lawn Market. Located in a close on the south side, Riddle's Court is the well-preserved 16th-century house of a merchant John MacMorran, who was shot by rioting schoolboys in 1595.

Today, the majority of shops in the street are aimed at tourists. On the north side is the preserved 17th century merchant's townhouse Gladstone's Land owned by the National Trust for Scotland. The lower end of the Lawnmarket is intersected by George IV Bridge on the right (south) and Bank Street on the left (north), leading to The Mound and the New Town. The view down Bank Street is closed by the baroque headquarters of the Bank of Scotland.

On the south-west corner of this intersection, with its entrance on George IV Bridge, is the Hotel Missoni, replacing the former Lothian Regional Council offices. This building is of controversial design, winning a Scottish Civic Trust award and a 2010 RIBA award, but also being nominated for the Carbuncle Cup in 2009.

Between Bank Street and St Giles Street, marking the end of the Lawnmarket, the High Court of Justiciary, Scotland's supreme criminal court, is housed in the Justiciary Building.

== High Street ==
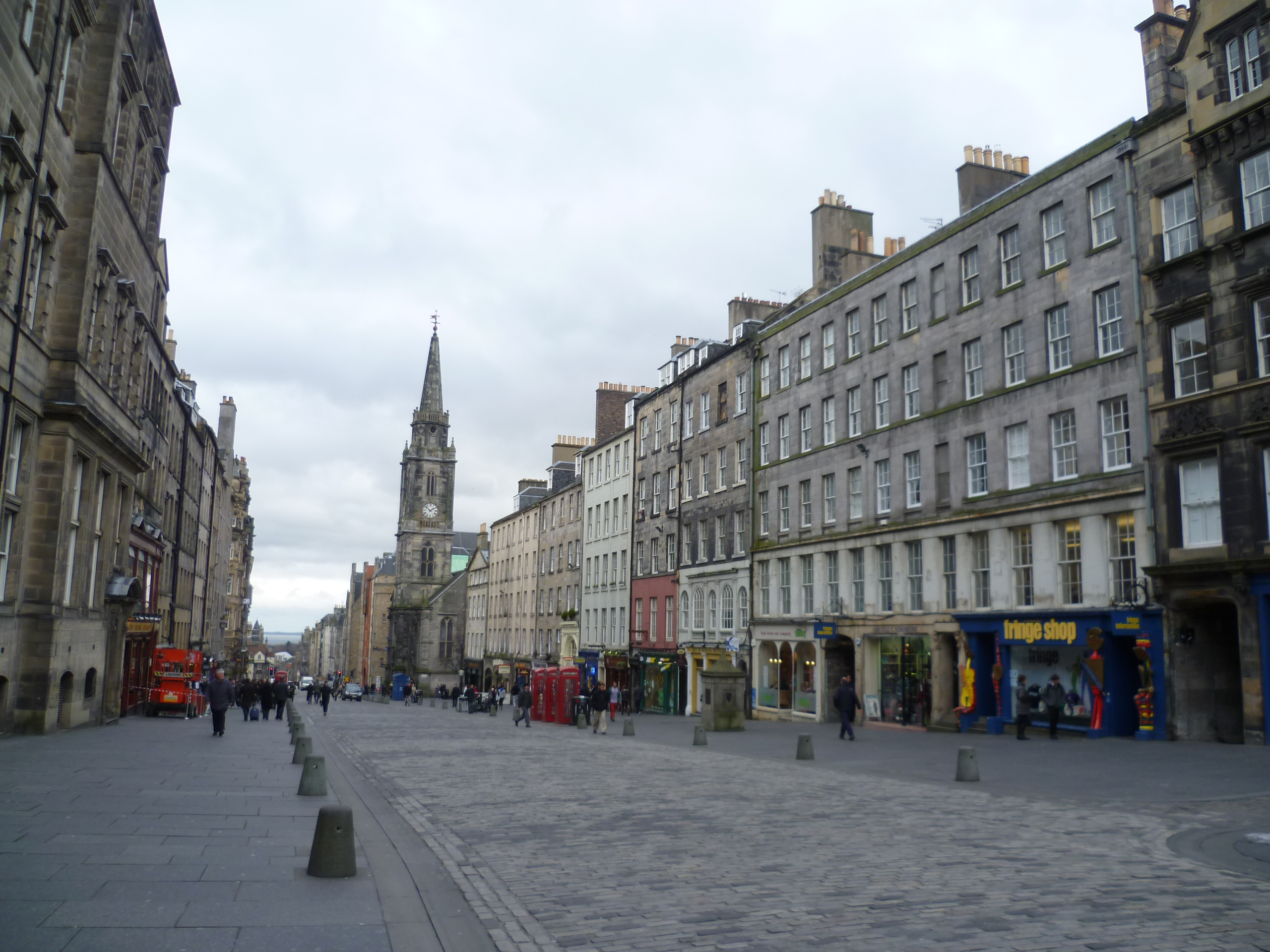
Looking down the High Street towards the Tron Kirk, the section rebuilt in 1828 following the Great Fire of Edinburgh (1824)

On the south side, about one-third of the way down from the Castle toward the Palace is Parliament Square, named after the old Parliament House which housed both the law courts and the old Parliament of Scotland between the 1630s and 1707 (when its existence was ended by the Act of Union). Parliament House now houses the Court of Session, Scotland's supreme civil court. St Giles' Cathedral, the High Kirk of Edinburgh, also stands in Parliament Square.

By the West Door of St Giles' is the Heart of Midlothian, a heart-shaped pattern built into the "setted" road, marking the site of the Old Tolbooth, formerly the centre of administration, taxation and justice in the burgh. The prison was described by Sir Walter Scott as the "Heart of Midlothian", and soon after demolition the city fathers marked the site with a heart mosaic. Locals have traditionally spat upon the heart's centre as a sign of contempt for the prison. On the north side, opposite St Giles', stand Edinburgh City Chambers, where the City of Edinburgh Council meets. On the south side, just past the High Kirk, is the Mercat Cross from which royal proclamations are read and the summoning of Parliament announced.

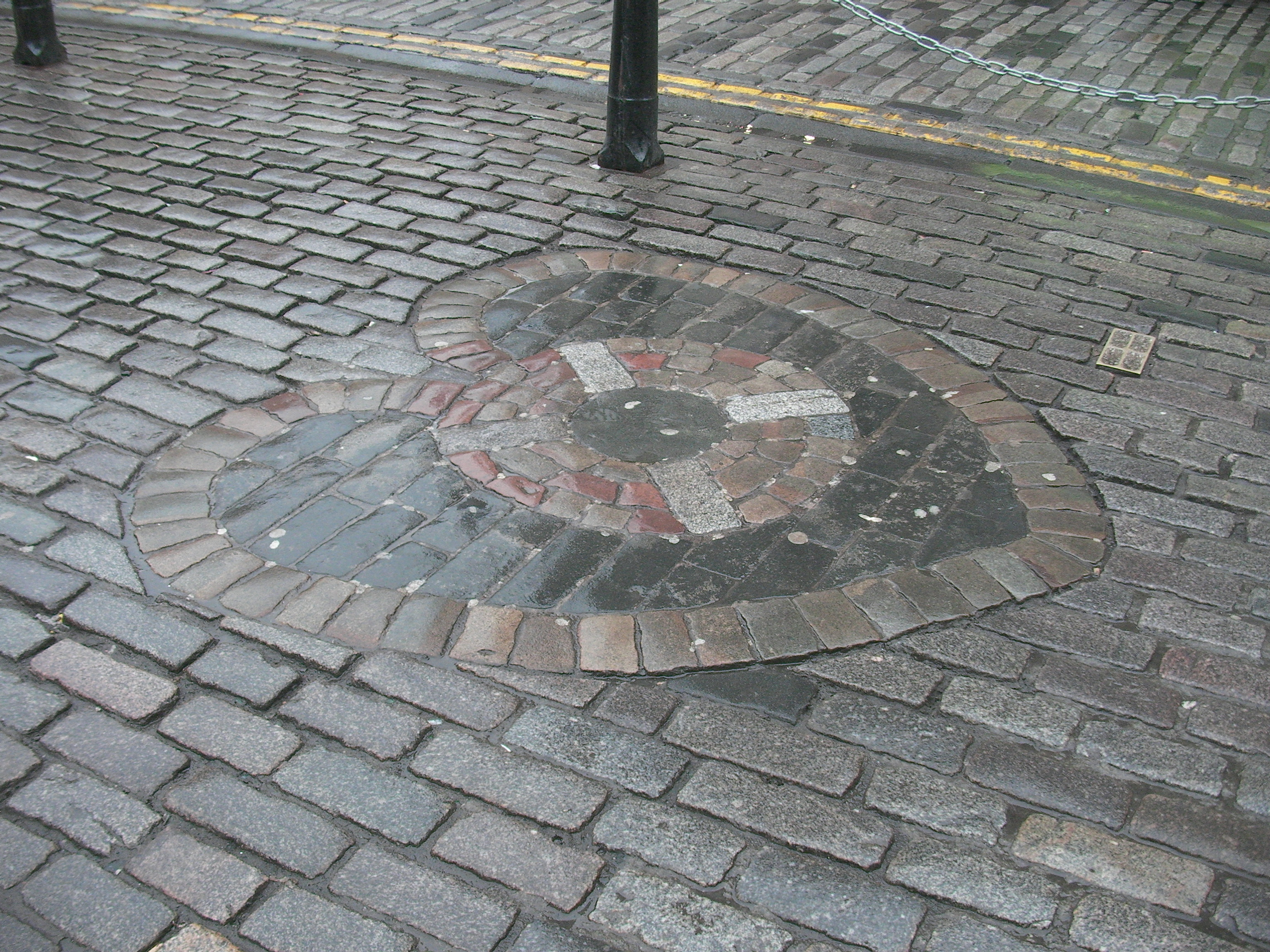
The Heart of Midlothian

The whole south side of buildings from St Giles to the Tron Kirk had to be rebuilt or refaced in the 1820s following the Great Edinburgh Fire of 1824. This was done in a Georgian style, stepping down the hill.

The central focus of the Royal Mile is a major intersection with the Bridges. North Bridge runs north over Waverley station to the New Town's Princes Street. South Bridge spans the Cowgate to the south.

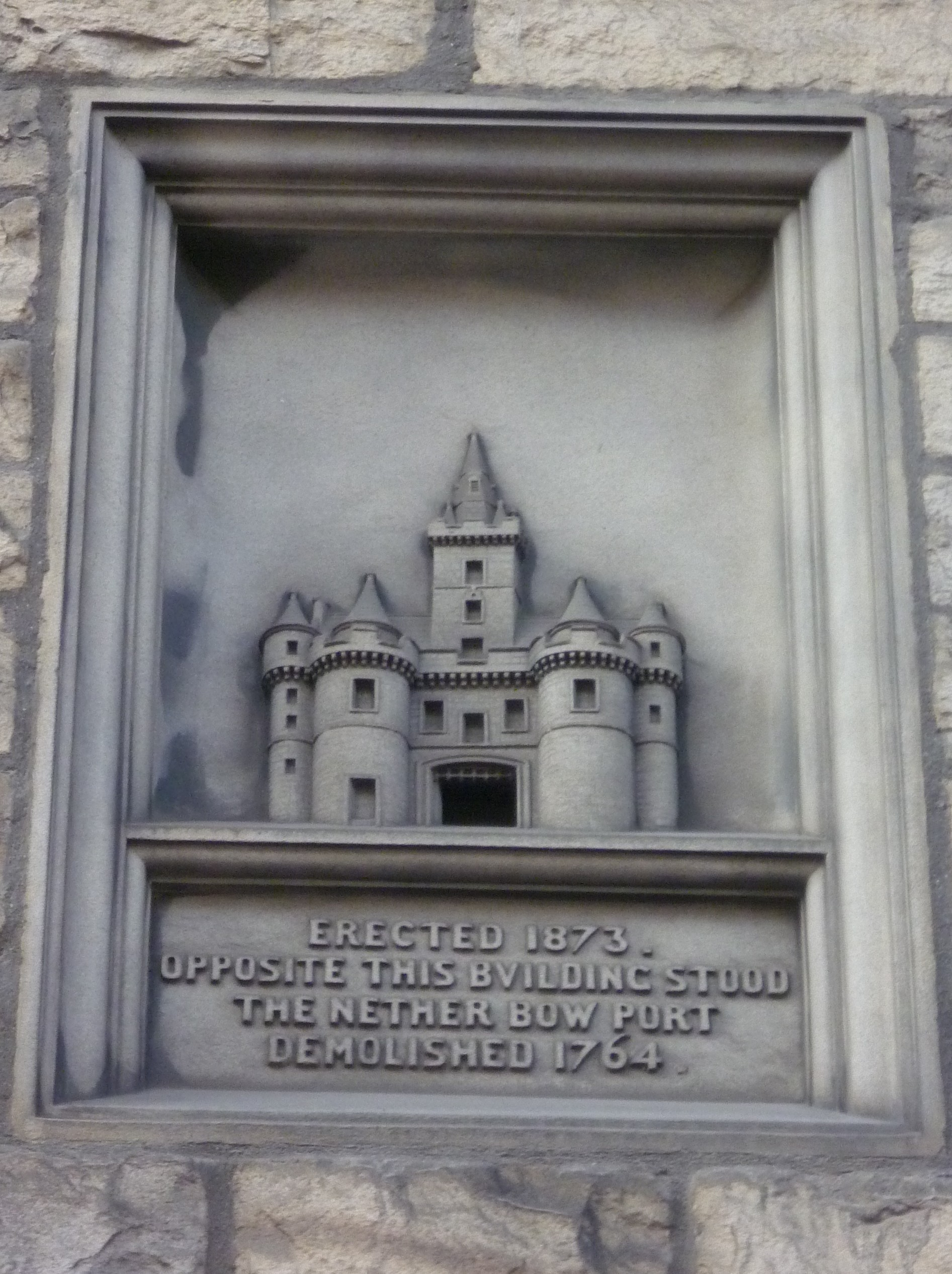
Tablet marking the site of the Netherbow Port

At John Knox's House the High Street narrows to a section of the street formerly known as the Netherbow, which, at its crossroads with Jeffrey Street (north) and St Mary's Street (south), marked the former burgh boundary. At this point stood the Netherbow Port, a fortified gateway between Edinburgh and the Canongate (until 1856 a separate burgh), which was removed in 1764 to improve traffic flow. The Scottish Storytelling Centre is a modern extension to John Knox House, owned by the Church of Scotland. It opened in 2006, replacing the former Netherbow Arts Centre, which itself replaced the Moray-Knox Church in the 1960s. Following the English victory over the Scots at the Battle of Flodden in 1513, a town wall was built around Edinburgh known as the Flodden Wall, some parts of which survive. The Netherbow Port was a gateway in this wall and brass studs in the road mark its former position. On the corner of St Mary's Street is the World's End Pub which takes its name from the adjacent World's End Close, whimsically so named because this was in former times the last close in Edinburgh before entering the Canongate.

=== Royal entertainments ===
Edinburgh goldsmiths organised a "Pageant of the Passion" for James IV and Margaret Tudor in 1507.

There was a triumph or show at the Salt Tron and other locations on the Royal Mile to celebrate the marriage of Mary, Queen of Scots, and the Dauphin of France (the future Francis II) on 3 July 1558. The wedding itself took place in Paris on 24 April 1558. The Edinburgh entertainment was written and produced by William Lauder and William Adamson. Walter Binning painted the "play cart" for actors portraying the signs of the seven planets and Cupid. Artificial "summer trees" decorated with fruit made from tennis balls covered with gold foil or leaf were placed on four stages. The seven planets had been portrayed in a show in Paris after the wedding.

Other 16th-century royal entertainments at the Tron and on the Royal Mile include the Entry of Mary, Queen of Scots (1561), the Entry of James VI (1579), and the Entry of Anne of Denmark (1590). In July 1598, scholars from Edinburgh High School put on a satirical play at the Tolbooth. Costumes were made for the characters of a Pope, two Cardinals, and several friars. After the performance the costumes were donated to the poor.

=== Murders of note ===
Several infamous murders have taken place on the central section of the Royal Mile:

- George Lockhart, Lord Carnwath, murdered by John Chieslie in 1689.
- In 1806 William Begbie was murdered in the close leading to Tweeddale Court. James Mackcoull was suspected of the murder but he died before being brought to trail.
- In 1977, Angus Sinclair murdered two girls, Christine Eadie, 17, and Helen Scott, in East Lothian. Although the murders did not take place in the Royal Mile, they are colloquially known as the World's End Murders because the girls were last seen drinking in the World's End pub in the High Street.

== Canongate ==
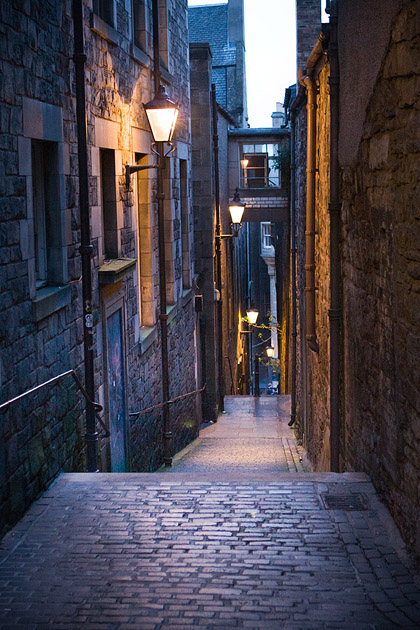
Anchor Close at twilight looking towards Cockburn Street from the Royal Mile.

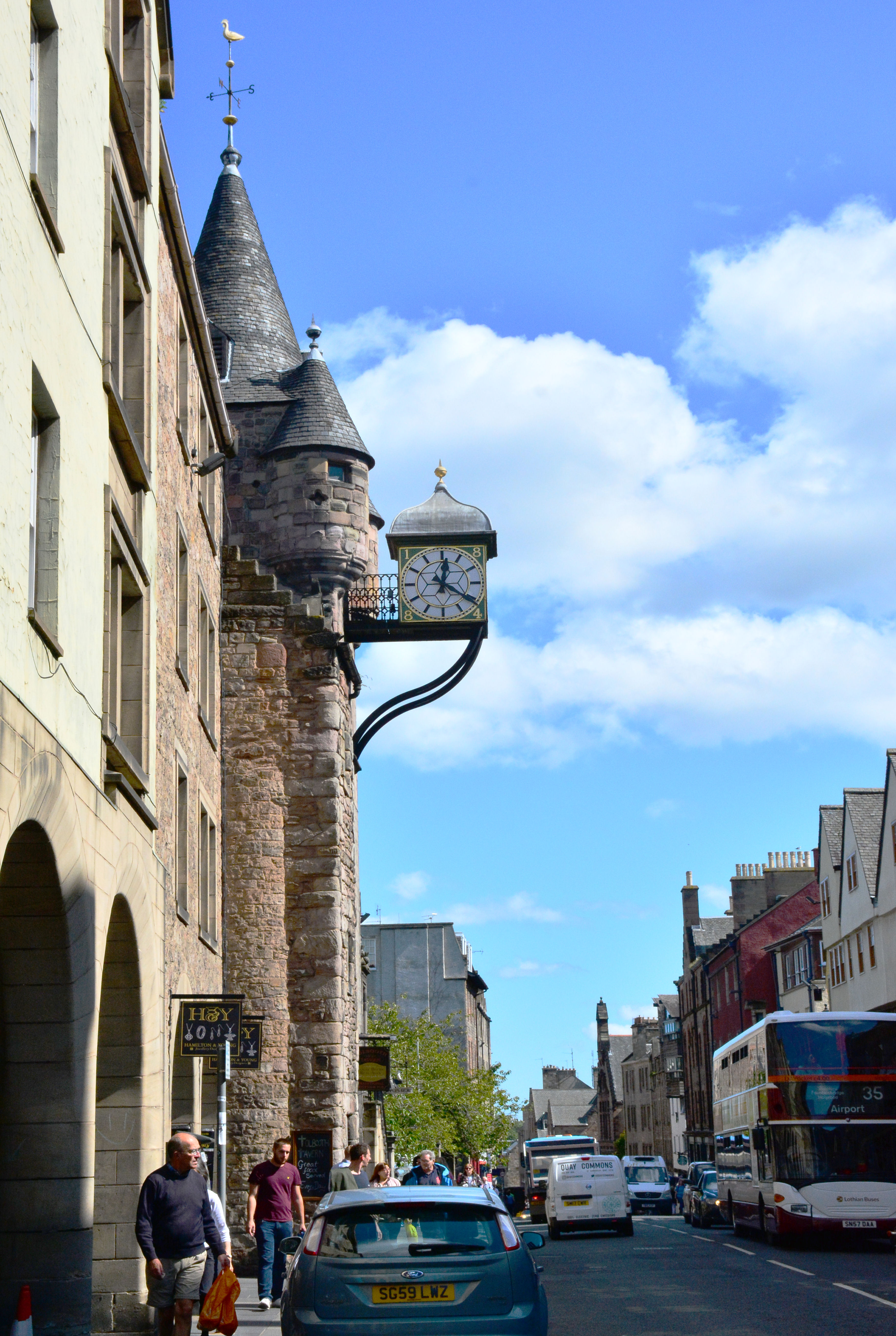
Canongate Tollbooth Clock

Beyond the crossroads, the Royal Mile continues down the Canongate, meaning literally "the canons' way" when it was used in former times by the Augustinian canons of Holyrood Abbey. The street continues downhill past Moray House (now the main academic offices of Moray House School of Education of the University of Edinburgh), the Canongate Tolbooth (now a museum of social history called The People's Story), the Kirk of the Canongate (the Canongate's parish church and a thriving congregation of the Church of Scotland) and the new Scottish Parliament Building to Holyrood Palace and the ruined abbey. Until 1856 the Canongate was not merely a street, but the name of the surrounding burgh, separate from Edinburgh and outside the Flodden Wall.

== Abbey Strand ==
This street is the short approach to the Palace of Holyroodhouse at the foot of the Canongate. On the north side, the building to the east was the house of Lucky Spence, a notorious brothel madam, remembered in Allan Ramsay's poem, Lucky Spence's Last Advice. The building to the west was described as a new "Great Mansion" in 1570. Renaissance painted ceilings were salvaged from the building in 1967. Some of the timbers were felled in the 1560s. During 20th century restorations by the Ministry of Works, other painted beams found at Midhope Castle and Caroline Park were inserted into the buildings.

On the south side is the King's Gallery, used to exhibit items in the Royal collection, in the shell of the former Holyrood Free Church and Duchess of Gordon's School. There are also the remains of the gatehouse of Holyrood Palace built by Walter Merlioun for James IV, with a carving of the royal coat-of-arms of James V set in the wall.

== See also ==
- List of closes on the Royal Mile
- Moubray House
- Museum of Childhood
- Royal Mile police box
- Writers' Museum
