= Basil Skinner =

Scottish historian (1923–1995)

Dr Basil Chisholm Skinner OBE (7 November 1923 – 5 April 1995) was a Scottish historian and architectural conservation campaigner. He was founder of the Dean Village Association. In 1974 he co-founded the Hopetoun Trust which brought about the saving of Hopetoun House.

== Life ==
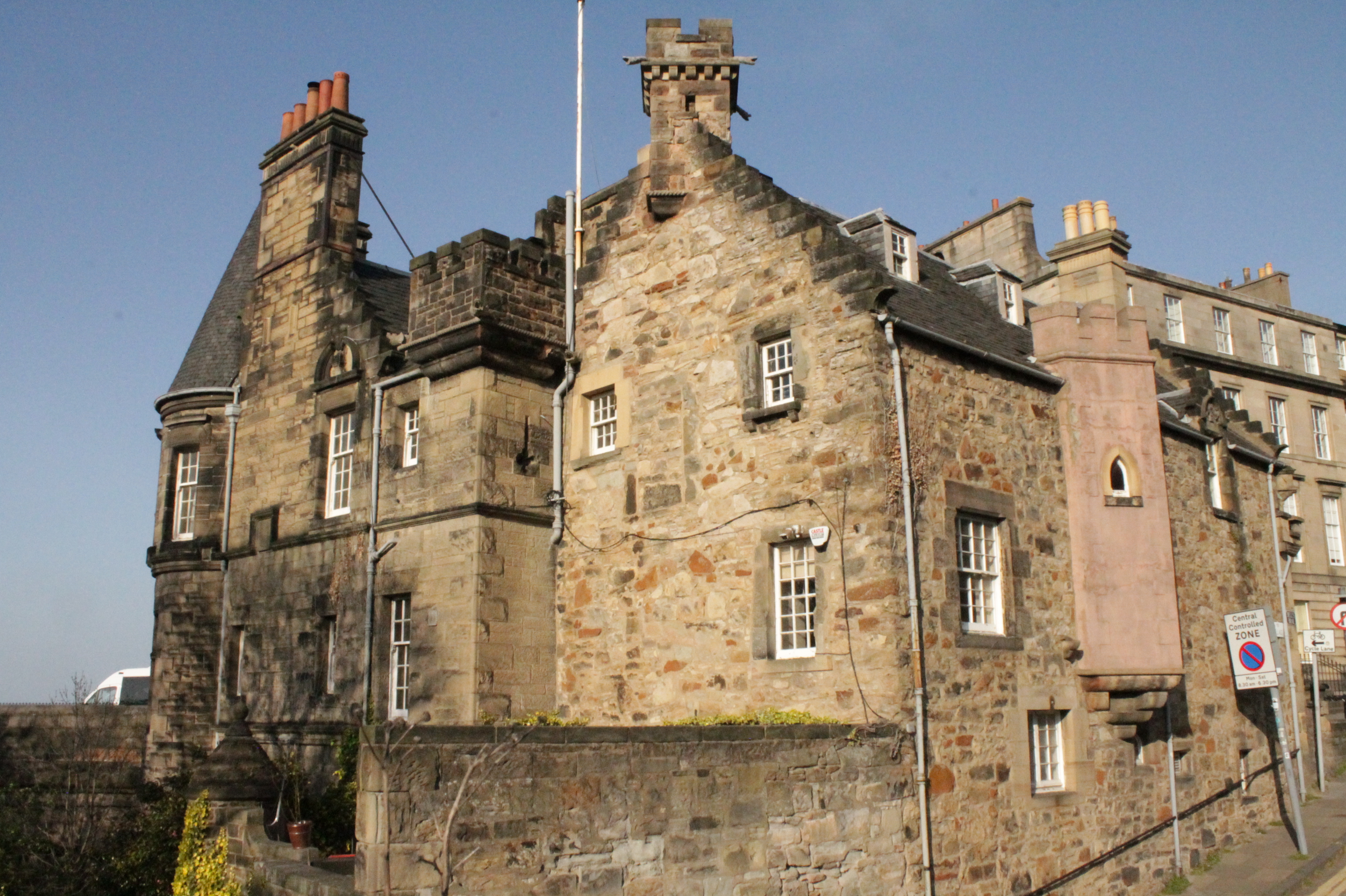
Deanbrae House, Edinburgh

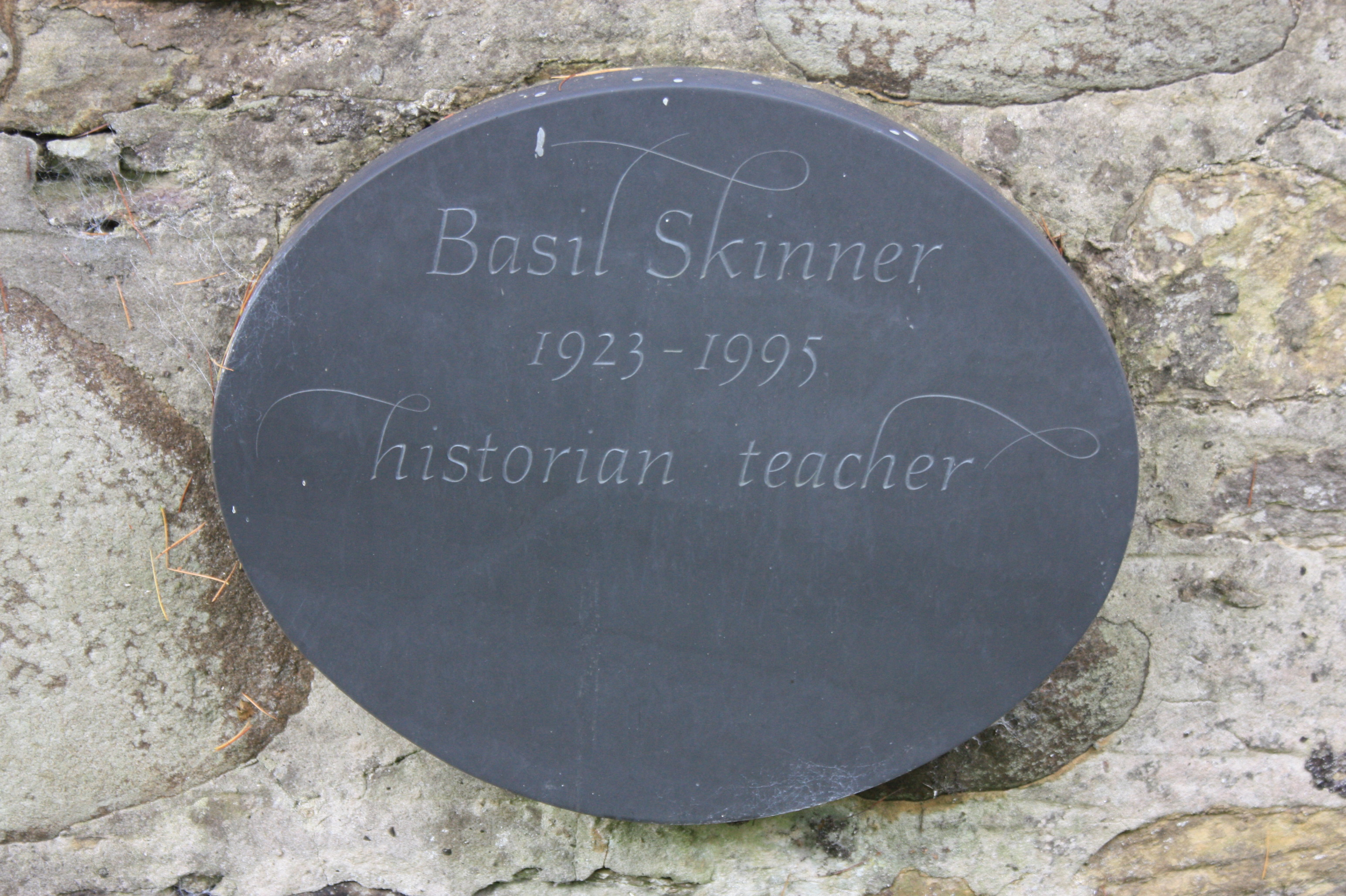
The grave of Basil Skinner, Dean Cemetery

He was born in Edinburgh on 7 November 1923, and educated at Harecroft Hall near Westwater, Cumberland. He then completed his education at Edinburgh Academy, winning the Aitken Prize in Classics, before studying history at the University of Edinburgh.

His studies were interrupted by the Second World War during which he served first with the East Riding of Yorkshire Yeomanry before transferring to the Intelligence Corps. He returned to the University of Edinburgh after the war and completed his degree in history also winning the Cousin Prize in Fine Art.

In 1951 he became Librarian at the Glasgow School of Art. In 1954 returned to Edinburgh as Assistant Curator of the Scottish National Portrait Gallery aged only 31. From 1966 to 1979 he was Director of Extra-Mural Studies at the University of Edinburgh.

In the 1960s he campaigned against a proposal by Stirlingshire County Council to infill a large section of the Union Canal. He could not prevent its formal closure as a public route in 1965. He was one of the founders of the Edinburgh New Town Conservation Committee (ENTCC), the Dean Village Association, and the Edinburgh Schools Holiday Club. He was a committee member on the Cockburn Association, the SDA Conservation Committee, the National Trust for Scotland and the Old Edinburgh Club.

From 1955 to 1983 he lived in Deanbrae (aka Kirkbrae) House, a distinctive former toll-house, partly of 17th century origin, but mainly by James Graham Fairley in 1892. It stands at the east end of Dean Bridge, high above Dean Village. The house is now addressed as 10 Randolph Cliff.

He died on 5 April 1995, and is buried in Dean Cemetery. His grave lies on the south-west spur backing onto the Dean Gallery.

== Family ==
He was married to Lydia Mary (1927-2017), and together they had two sons.

== Exhibitions at SNPG by Skinner ==
- Scots in Italy in the 18th Century (1963)
- Shakespeare in Scottish Art (1964)
- Sir Walter Scott Bicentenary Exhibition (1971)
- King James the Sixth and First (at Royal Scottish Museum)

== Publications ==
- Burns: the Authentic Likenesses (1959)
- Scottish History in Perspective (1964)
- Scots in Italy in the 18th Century (1966)
- The Cramond Ironworks (1968)
- The Lime Industry in Lothian (1969)
- The Indefatigable Mr Allan (1973)
- King James the VI and I (1975)
