= List of courts in Scotland =

Flow chart of Scotland's court system

The courts of Scotland are part of the Scottish legal system. Each court has its own jurisdiction and in many cases, a right of appeal lies from one to another. Courts apply Scots law. Criminal cases are prosecuted by the Crown Office and Procurator Fiscal Service. and the Scottish Courts and Tribunal Service. Scotland's supreme criminal court is the High Court of Justiciary. The Court of Session is the supreme Scottish civil court but UK-wide courts can review decisions of great public or constitutional importance.

Scots law is developed and interpreted by the courts of Scotland, particularly the supreme courts. Most civil law disputes will be resolved by the lower courts or tribunals. A great number of disputes are resolved extrajudicially. Scots law provides for the binding settlement of civil disputes, including through voluntary mediation, and arbitration. An increasing number of ombudsmen and other authorities have the authority to resolve disputes. The Procurator Fiscal Service obviates the criminal courts in many cases through the use of fiscal fines and other alternatives to prosecution. While most prosecutions will result in a plea of guilty, accused persons must still appear in court to plead guilty and for sentencing. All bail proceedings in Scotland are heard in the sheriff courts, regardless of the court in which the accused might eventually be prosecuted.

== Supranational courts ==
- The Supreme Court of the United Kingdom (successor to the House of Lords, whose decisions are still binding).
- Prior to the British exit from the European Union, the Court of Justice of the European Union (CJEU) had exclusive jurisdiction over the interpretation of European law.
- The European Court of Human Rights has jurisdiction to hear cases from Scotland, but its powers are essentially advisory.
- The Judicial Committee of the Privy Council is, in practice, a court of the United Kingdom. The jurisdiction it held from 2005 until 2009 over devolution disputes has been transferred to the UK Supreme Court. It continues to have jurisdiction over disputes arising around Scottish constituencies under the House of Commons Disqualification Act 1975.

== Supreme Courts ==
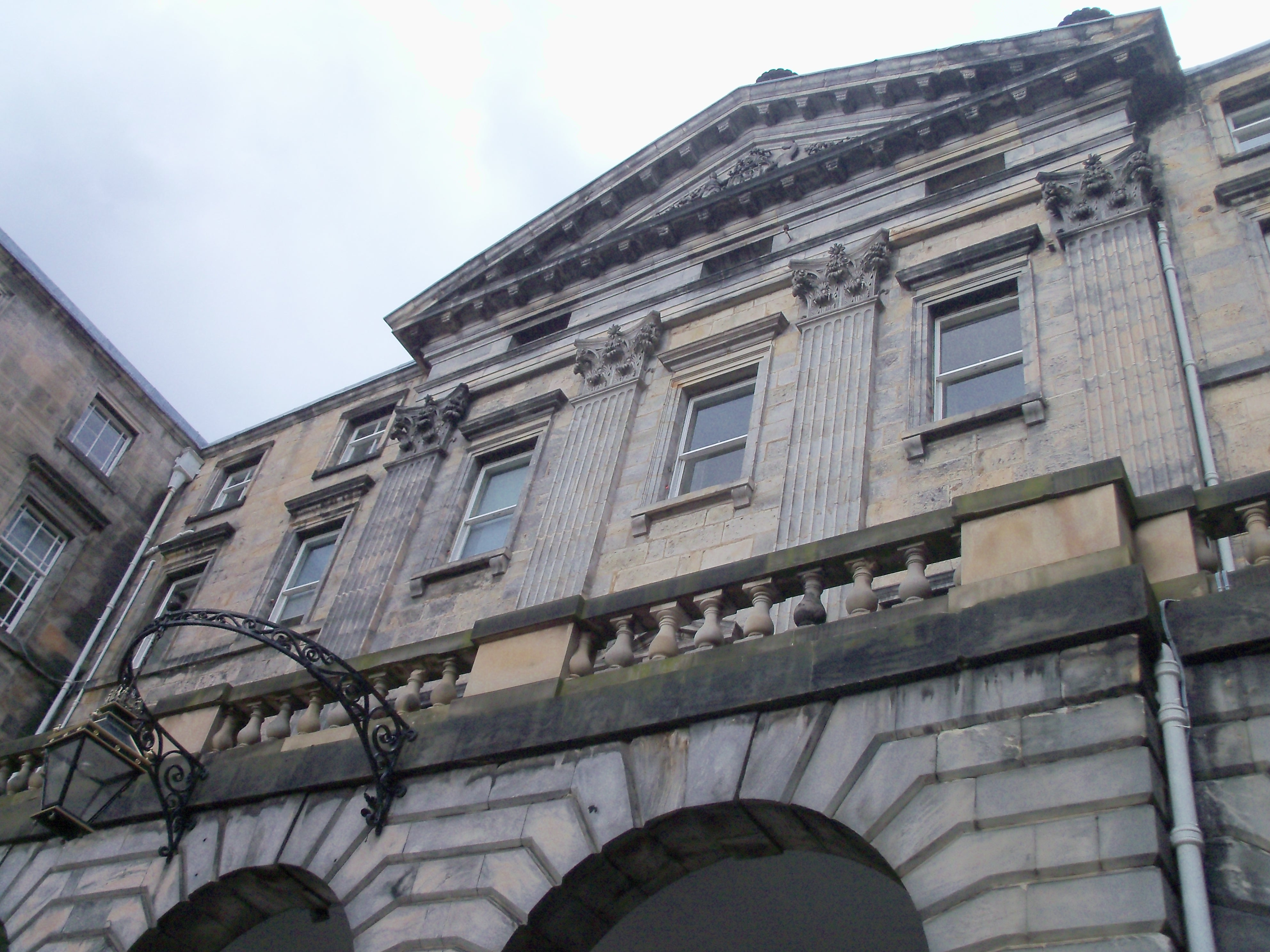
The Supreme Courts of Scotland are housed at Parliament House, Edinburgh

- Supreme Courts of Scotland
  - Court of Session
  - High Court of Justiciary
    - Justiciary Building, Edinburgh
    - Justiciary Buildings, Glasgow
    - Aberdeen Sheriff Court Annex and High Court of Justiciary
  - Office of the Accountant of Court
  - Auditor of the Court of Session

== Sheriff Courts ==
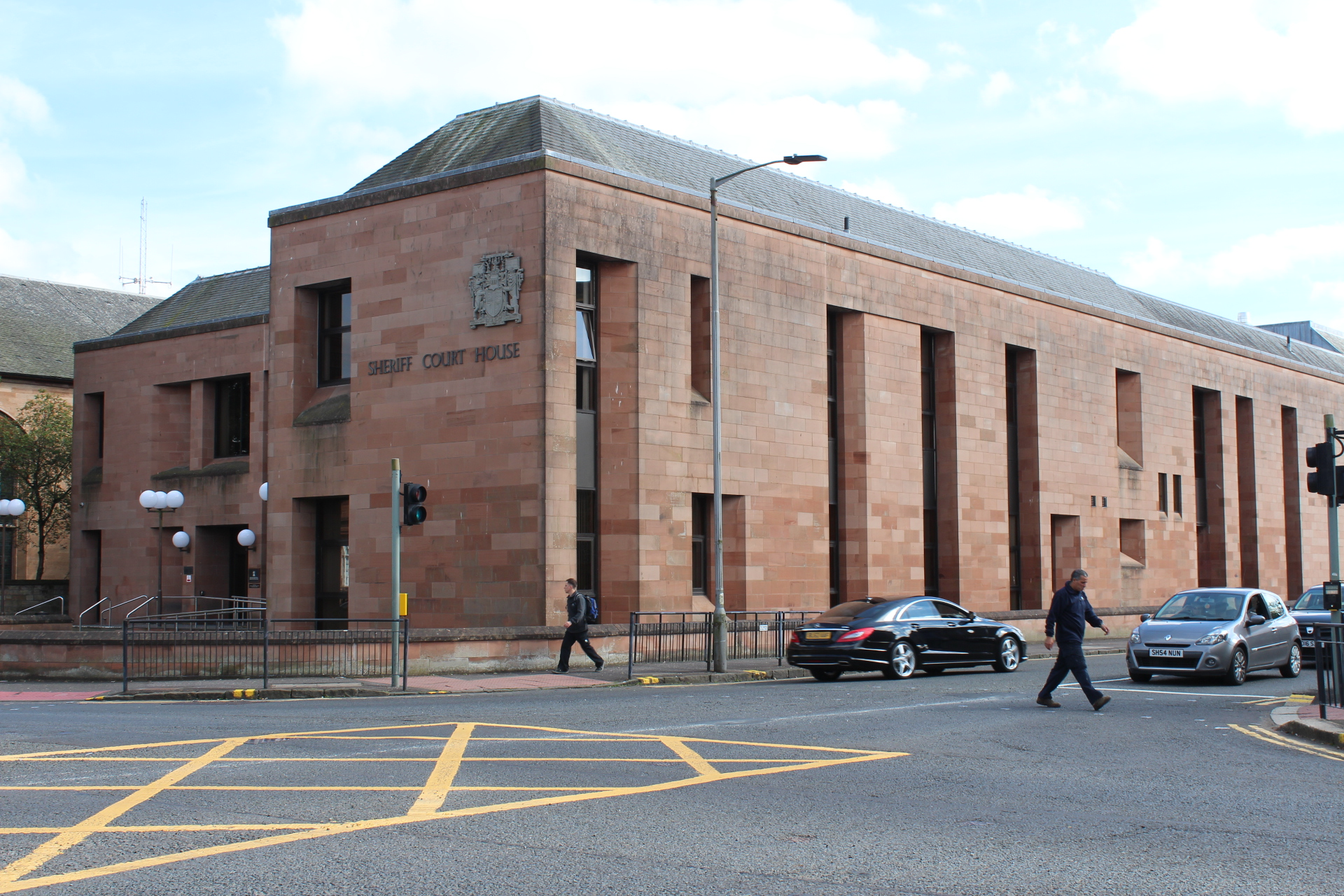
Kilmarnock Sheriff Court

Some Sheriff courts in Scotland also operate as a Justice of the Peace Court. Such courts, which serve as both a Sheriff and Justice of the Peace Court is noted below:

=== A–F ===
- Aberdeen Sheriff Court and Justice of the Peace Court
- Airdrie Sheriff Court and Justice of the Peace Court Annexe
- Alloa Sheriff Court and Justice of the Peace Court
- Ayr Sheriff Court and Justice of the Peace Court
- Banff Sheriff Court and Justice of the Peace Court
- Campbeltown Sheriff Court and Justice of the Peace Court
- Dumbarton Sheriff Court and Justice of the Peace Court
- Dumfries Sheriff Court and Justice of the Peace Court
- Dundee Sheriff Court and Justice of the Peace Court
- Dunfermline Sheriff Court and Justice of the Peace Court
- Dunoon Sheriff Court and Justice of the Peace Court
- Edinburgh Sheriff Court and Justice of the Peace Court
- Elgin Sheriff Court and Justice of the Peace Court

=== F–O ===
- Falkirk Sheriff Court and Justice of the Peace Court
- Forfar Sheriff Court and Justice of the Peace Court
- Fort William Sheriff Court and Justice of the Peace Court
- Glasgow Sheriff Court and Justice of the Peace Court
- Greenock Sheriff Court and Justice of the Peace Court
- Hamilton Sheriff Court
- Inverness Sheriff Court and Justice of the Peace Court
- Jedburgh Sheriff Court and Justice of the Peace Court
- Kilmarnock Sheriff Court and Justice of the Peace Court
- Kirkcaldy Sheriff Court and Justice of the Peace Court
- Kirkwall Sheriff Court
- Lanark Sheriff Court and Justice of the Peace Court
- Lerwick Sheriff Court
- Livingston Sheriff Court and Justice of the Peace Court
- Lochmaddy Sheriff Court

=== O–Z ===
- Oban Sheriff Court and Justice of the Peace Court
- Paisley Sheriff Court and Justice of the Peace Court
- Perth Sheriff Court and Justice of the Peace Court
- Peterhead Sheriff Court and Justice of the Peace Court
- Portree Sheriff Court
- Selkirk Sheriff Court and Justice of the Peace Court
- Stirling Sheriff Court and Justice of the Peace Court
- Stornoway Sheriff Court
- Stranraer Sheriff Court and Justice of the Peace Court
- Tain Sheriff Court and Justice of the Peace Court
- Wick Sheriff Court

=== Appeal Court ===
- Sheriff Appeal Court

== Justice of the Peace courts ==
Separate Justice of the peace courts, not part of a Sheriff Court, are noted below:

- Hamilton Justice of the Peace Court
- Lochgilphead Justice of the Peace Court

== Specialist courts ==
- Court of the Lord Lyon
- Scottish Land Court
- Lands Tribunal for Scotland
- Children's hearing

== Historical courts ==
- Admiralty court
- District court
- Court of Exchequer
- High Court of Constabulary

== See also ==
- Scots law
- List of Scottish legal cases
- Law of the United Kingdom
