= Judicial Appointments Board for Scotland =

Agency overview
- Formed: 2002
- Type: advisory non-departmental public body
- Jurisdiction: Scotland
- Headquarters: Thistle House, Edinburgh
- Agency executives: Lindsay Montgomery, Chair; Laura McGeary, Chief Executive
- Parent agency: Scottish Government
- Website: www.judicialappointments.scot

Map
- Scotland in the UK and Europe

The Judicial Appointments Board for Scotland (Scottish Gaelic: Bòrd Dreuchdan Breithneachaidh na h-Alba) is an advisory non-departmental public body of the Scottish Government responsible for making recommendations on appointments to certain offices of the judiciary of Scotland. It was established in June 2002 on a non-statutory, ad hoc, basis by the Scottish Government, and was given statutory authority by the Judiciary and Courts (Scotland) Act 2008.

All recommendations are made to the First Minister, who must consult the Lord President of the Court of Session before making a recommendation to the monarch in relation to full-time, permanent, judiciary, or before any appointments are made by Scottish Ministers to temporary or part-time judicial office.

The board does not make recommendations for, or have any in role in the appointment of, justices of the peace, whose appointments are made by Scottish Ministers on the recommendation of Justice of the Peace Advisory Committees for each sheriffdom.

== History ==
The Judicial Appointments Board was established in June 2002 on a non-statutory, ad hoc, basis by the Scottish Government, and was given statutory authority by the Judiciary and Courts (Scotland) Act 2008. The board was established on a statutory basis following criticism of its perceived lack of independence from political interference by the executive, and following the Scottish Government's consultation Strengthening Judicial Independence in a Modern Scotland.

In 2002, the board initially had equal numbers of lay and legally qualified members: five lay members, three judicial members, and two members from the legal profession (advocate and solicitors). The method of creating the board and appointing members was not without criticism. The Law Society of Scotland in its members' magazine Journal was critical that the appointments process did not follow procedures recommended by the Committee on Standards in Public Life, and the chair of the board is a lay member, a situation said to be "unique in Europe", where the norm is for self-governing bodies to control judicial appointments.

In 2006, Sir Neil McIntosh, chair of the board, was critical that the Scottish Executive did not put the board on a statutory footing, as is the case for the Judicial Appointments Commission in England.

In 2022, an amendment to the Judiciary and Courts (Scotland) Act 2008 increased the size of the board from 12 to 16, retaining the equal split of lay and legal/judicial members.

The board continues to be chaired by a lay member, who is appointed to the position by the Scottish Ministers. The chairing member is appointed for a maximum of four years, and may be reappointed.

== Process ==
All recommendations are made to the First Minister, who must consult the Lord President of the Court of Session before making his or her recommendation to the monarch in relation to full-time judiciary. Appointments to the offices of temporary sheriff principal, part-time sheriffs and part-time summary sheriffs are made by the Scottish Ministers.

== Board members ==
As of February 2025 the board has 16 members, with 5 judicial members appointed by the Lord President, and three legal members and eight lay members appointed by the Scottish Ministers. Judicial members include two appointed from the Court of Session (but may not be either the Lord President or Lord Justice Clerk), a sheriff principal, a sheriff and a Chamber President of the First-tier Tribunals of Scotland. The legal members include an advocate and a solicitor.

As of June 2026, current board members were:

- Chairing member: Mr Lindsay Montgomery
- Lay member: Eizabeth Burnley CBE
- Lay member: Paul Gray
- Lay member: Emma Marriott
- Lay member: Dr Fiona McLean
- Lay member: Gareth Morgan QPM
- Lay member: Peter Murray
- Judicial member: Lady Haldane, Senator of the College of Justice
- Judicial member: Lord Weir, Senator of the College of Justice
- Judicial member: Sheriff Principal Kate Dowdalls KC
- Judicial member: Sheriff Jane Farquharson KC
- Judicial member: May Dunsmuir, President of the Health & Education Chamber of First-tier Tribunal for Scotland
- Legal member: Jonathan Barne KC
- Legal member: Paul Cackette CBE
- Legal member: Denise Loney

=== Chairing members ===
Chairing members are always lay members of the board, and are appointed for a period of four years (up to a maximum of eigh years). The chairing member receives a daily fee of £350, and is eligible to claim expenses incurred whilst on board business.

| Chairing member | | Year assumed office | Year left office | Appointed by |
|---|---|---|---|---|
| 1 | Sir Neil McIntosh | 2002 | 2008 | Jack McConnell |
| 2 | Sir Muir Russell | 2008 | 2014 | Alex Salmond |
| 3 | Dr Michael Ewart | 2010 | 2016 | Alex Salmond (2010); Nicola Sturgeon (2016) |
| 4 | Nicola Gordon | 2016 | 2021 | Nicola Sturgeon (2016) |
| 5 | Mr Lindsay Montgomery | 2022 | Incumbent | Nicola Sturgeon (2022) |

=== Former judicial members ===
Judicial members are appointed for four years (up to a maximum of eight years) and receive no fees for work undertaken, though they may claim for incurred on board business.

| Judicial member | Judicial office | Year assumed office | Year left office | Appointed by |
|---|---|---|---|---|
| Lord MacLean | Senator of the College of Justice | 2002 | 2005 | n |
| Bruce Kerr | Sheriff principal | 2002 | 2007 | Lord President Cullen |
| J Douglas Allan | Sheriff | 2002 | 2008 | Lord President Cullen |
| Lord Wheatley | Senator of the College of Justice | 2005 | 2007 | Lord President Cullen |
| Sir Stephen Young | Sheriff principal | 2007 | 2010 | Lord President Hamilton |
| Michael O'Grady | Sheriff | | 2020 | |
| Maryisa Lewis | Sheriff Principal | 2019 | 2021 | Lord President Carloway |
| Lady Wise | Senator of the College of Justice | 2018 | 2022 | Lord President Carloway |
| Lord Minginish | Chair of the Scottish Land Court | 2018 | 2022 | Lord President Carloway |
| Aisha Anwar | Sheriff Principal | 2021 | 2023 | Lord President Carloway |
| David Young | Sheriff | 2020 | 2024 | Lord President Carloway |

=== Former legal members ===
Legal members are appointed for four years (up to a maximum of eigh years) and receive a fee of £290 per day of board work, and they may claim for incurred on board business.

| Legal member | Legal office | Year assumed office | Year left office | Appointed by |
|---|---|---|---|---|
| Colin Campbell | Advocate | 2002 | 2005 | Lord President Cullen |
| Michael Scanlan | Solicitor | 2002 | 2008 | Lord President Cullen |
| Valerie Stacey | Advocate | 2005 | 2007 | Lord President Cullen |
| Roy Martin | Advocate | 2007 | 2010 | Lord President Hamilton |
| Morag Ross | Advocate | 2019 | 2023 | Lord President Carloway |
| Cat MacLean | Solicitor | 2022 | 2024 | Lord President Carloway |

=== Former lay members ===
Lay members are appointed for four years (up to a maximum of eight years) and receive a fee of £290 per day of board work, and they may claim for incurred on board business.

| Lay member | Year assumed office | Year left office | Appointed by |
|---|---|---|---|
| Barbara Duffner | 2002 | 2008 | Jack McConnell |
| Professor Joan Stringer | 2002 | 2007 | Jack McConnell |
| Professor Alan Paterson | 2002 | 2008 | Jack McConnell |
| Sir Robert Smith | 2002 | 2007 | Jack McConnell |
| Reverend John Miller | 2009 | 2010 | Nicola Sturgeon |
| Neelam Bakshi | | 2023 | Nicola Sturgeon |
| Professor Stephen Tierney | | 2023 | Nicola Sturgeon |
| Deirdre Fulton | | 2023 | Nicola Sturgeon |

== Remit ==
The board has a remit for making recommendations on appointments to judicial offices as specified by Section 10 of the Judiciary and Courts (Scotland) Act 2008.

=== Judicial offices ===
- Senator of the College of Justice
- Chairman of the Scottish Land Court
- Temporary judge of the Court of Session or High Court of Justiciary
- Sheriff principal
- Sheriff
- Part-time sheriff
- Summary sheriff
- Part-time summary sheriff
- Scottish Tribunals
  - Vice-President of Upper Tribunal
  - Chamber President, First-tier Tribunal
  - Deputy Chamber President, First-tier Tribunal
  - Ordinary member, First-tier or Upper Tribunal
  - Legal member, First-tier or Upper Tribunal
- The Parole Board for Scotland

== Business Management Unit ==
The board is supported by its Business Management Unit, which is staffed by civil servants but is independent of the Scottish Government, and is based in Edinburgh at Thistle House. The team is headed by Chief Executive, Ms Laura McGeary.

== Lay and legal appointments advisors ==
The members of the board are supported in sifting and interviewing candidates for judicial office, and have all the powers of a lay member of the board except they cannot take part in the decision making of the board. Appointments advisors may be appointed for three years and can subsequently be re-appointed for a further three years.

Lay appointments advisors
| Name | Date appointed | Date appointment ends |
|---|---|---|
| Marieke Dawarshuis | | |
| Peter McGrath | | |
| Dr Geoff Garner | | |
| Deirdre Fulton | | |

Legal Appointments Advisors
| Name | Date appointed | Date appointment ends |
|---|---|---|
| Gillian Mawdsley | | |
