= Sheriff court =

Principal local civil and criminal court in Scotland

- Royal Court of Arms of the United Kingdom as used by the Courts in Scotland
- Jurisdiction: Sheriff court districts in six sheriffdoms of Scotland
- Composition method: Appointed by Monarch on recommendation of First Minister of Scotland, who is given a recommendation from the Judicial Appointments Board for Scotland
- Authorised by: Sheriff Courts (Scotland) Act 1907; Sheriff Courts (Scotland) Act 1971; Courts Reform (Scotland) Act 2014
- Appeals to: Summary criminal proceedings, and certain civil actions: Sheriff Appeal Court; Solemn criminal proceedings: High Court of Justiciary; Other civil proceedings: Court of Session
- Judge term length: Permanent sheriffs: Life tenure with mandatory retirement at 70; Part-time sheriffs: 5 years subject to reappointment
- Website: www.scotcourts.gov.uk/the-courts/sheriff-court

A sheriff court (Scottish Gaelic: Cùirt an t-Siorraim) is the principal local civil and criminal court in Scotland, with exclusive jurisdiction over all civil cases with a monetary value up to £100,000, and with the jurisdiction to hear any criminal case except treason, murder, and rape, which are in the exclusive jurisdiction of the High Court of Justiciary. Though the sheriff courts have concurrent jurisdiction with the High Court over armed robbery, drug trafficking, and sexual offences involving children, the vast majority of these cases are heard by the High Court. Each court serves a sheriff court district within one of the six sheriffdoms of Scotland. Each sheriff court is presided over by a sheriff, who is a legally qualified judge, and part of the judiciary of Scotland.

Sheriff courts hear civil cases as a bench trial without a jury, and make determinations and judgments alone. However, the specialist all-Scotland Sheriff Personal Injury Court (based in Edinburgh) has the ability to hear cases with a jury of twelve. Sheriff courts hear criminal trials on complaint as a bench trial for summary offences, and as a trial with a jury of fifteen for indictable offences. Where a person is convicted following a case heard on complaint they can be sentenced to a maximum of twelve months' imprisonment and/or a £10,000 fine, and in solemn cases, 5 years' imprisonment or an unlimited fine.

Judgments of the sheriff courts in criminal offences handled through summary procedures, and civil cases handled through small claims and summary process, can be appealed to the Sheriff Appeal Court. Criminal offences heard on indictment through solemn procedure are appealed to the High Court of Justiciary. Other civil actions are appealed to the Inner House of the Court of Session.

== History ==
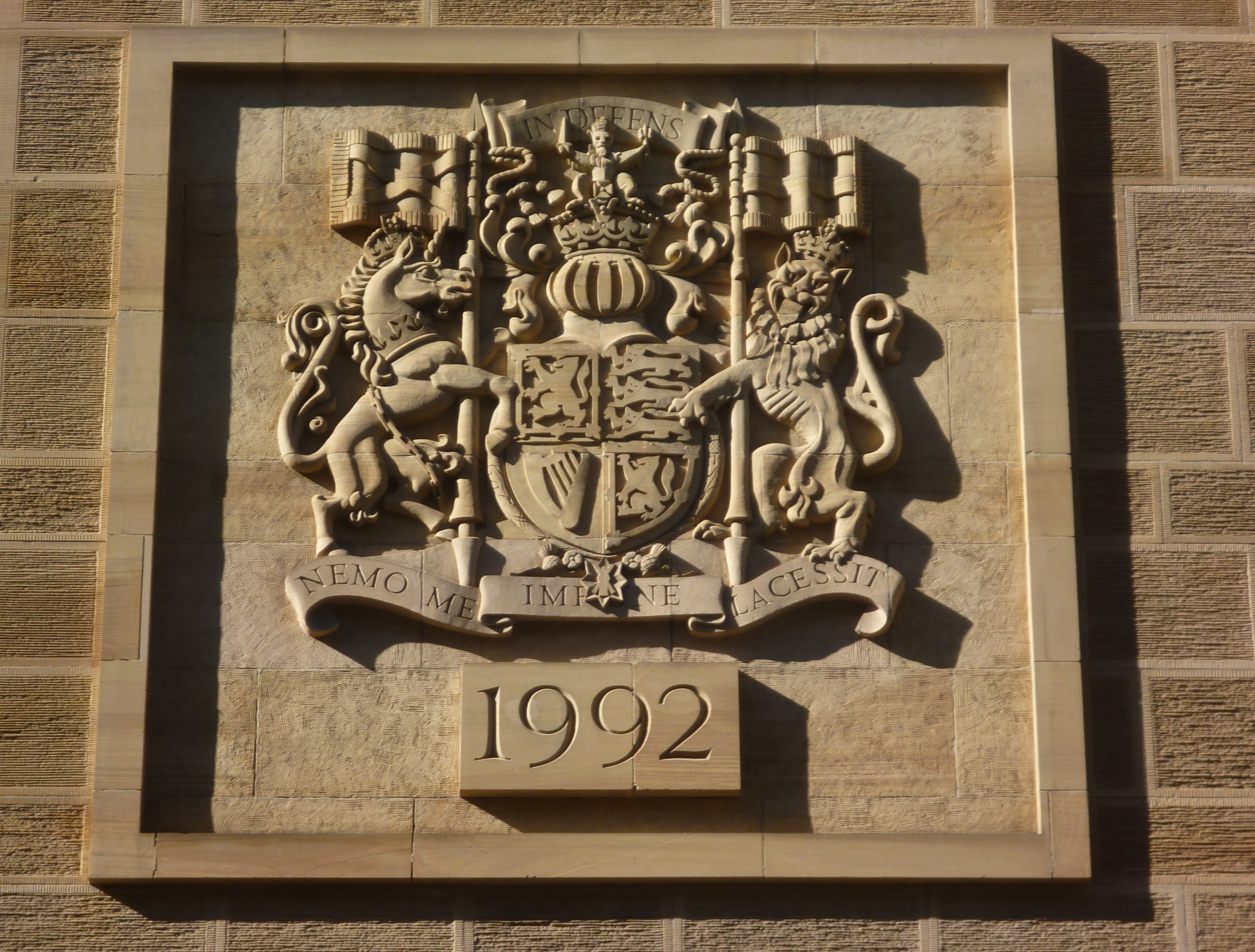
Scottish version of the Royal Arms at Edinburgh Sheriff Court

The office of sheriff dates from the early days of the Scottish monarchy. Generally, one of the more powerful local lords in each county was appointed and the office became hereditary in his family. The original purpose of the sheriff was to exercise and preserve the King's authority against the rival powers of the local lords and the sheriff became the local representative of the King in all matters, judicial and administrative. The sheriff dispensed the King's justice in his county in the Sheriff Court. The hereditary sheriff later delegated his judicial functions to a trained lawyer called a sheriff-depute. The Heritable Jurisdictions (Scotland) Act 1746 abolished the office of hereditary sheriff and the sheriff-depute soon became sheriff principal.

At first, only the sheriff of the Lothians and Peebles (who sat at Edinburgh) and the sheriff of Lanarkshire (who sat at Glasgow) were full-time appointments. Since the part-time sheriff-depute was not compelled to reside within his sheriffdom and could carry on his practice as advocate, it became common for a depute to appoint a sheriff-substitute who acted in his absence. Over time, the judicial duties of the depute were entirely assumed by the substitute and the depute became a judge of appeal from the decisions of his substitute.

The Sheriff Court (Scotland) Act 1870 combined the thirty counties of Scotland into fifteen sheriffdoms. Until 1877, the sheriffs-substitutes were appointed by the sheriffs-deputes; after 1877, that right was reserved to the Crown.

The civil procedure before the Sheriff Court underwent a major overhaul with the enactment of the Sheriff Courts (Scotland) Act 1907.

== Remit and jurisdiction ==
The legal cases which are heard within the courts are dealt with by a sheriff. A sheriff is a judge who is usually assigned to work in a specific court, although some work as "floating sheriffs", who may work anywhere in Scotland. There are about 140 full-time sheriffs in the various courts and a number of part-time sheriffs. They are appointed on the recommendation of the Judicial Appointments Board for Scotland. Until 1999, there were also "temporary sheriffs" who were appointed by the executive year by year and only sat for particular days by invitation; this class of sheriff was abolished as being inconsistent with judicial independence (contrary to article 6 of the European Convention on Human Rights) following the decision of the High Court of Justiciary in Starrs v Ruxton.

The sheriff courts are the main criminal courts. The procedure followed may either be solemn procedure, where the Sheriff sits with a jury of fifteen; or summary procedure, where the sheriff sits alone in a bench trial. From 10 December 2007, the maximum penalty that may be imposed in summary cases is 12 months' imprisonment and/or a £10,000 fine, and in solemn cases 5 years' imprisonment or an unlimited fine.

Since 2017, appeals against conviction and sentence from the justice of the peace and sheriff courts in summary procedure are remitted to the Sheriff Appeal Court.

The Sheriff Appeal Court can refer a point of law to the High Court of Justiciary.

== Staffing ==
The Courts are staffed by civil servants who are employed by the Scottish Courts and Tribunals Service which is a non-ministerial government department whose corporate board is chaired by the Lord President of the Court of Session, and is independent of the Scottish Ministers. The Scottish Courts and Tribunals Service publishes an online map, lists of Sheriffs, and the rules of the court under different procedures.

== Sheriffdoms ==
There are six sheriffdoms in Scotland, each with a sheriff principal. Within each sheriffdom are sheriff court districts, each with a court presided over by one or more sheriffs. The most senior civil servant in each Court is the sheriff clerk and he or she is charged directly with the management of the Court. The Sheriffdoms are Glasgow and Strathkelvin, Grampian, Highland and Islands, Lothian and Borders, North Strathclyde, South Strathclyde, Dumfries and Galloway, and Tayside Central and Fife.

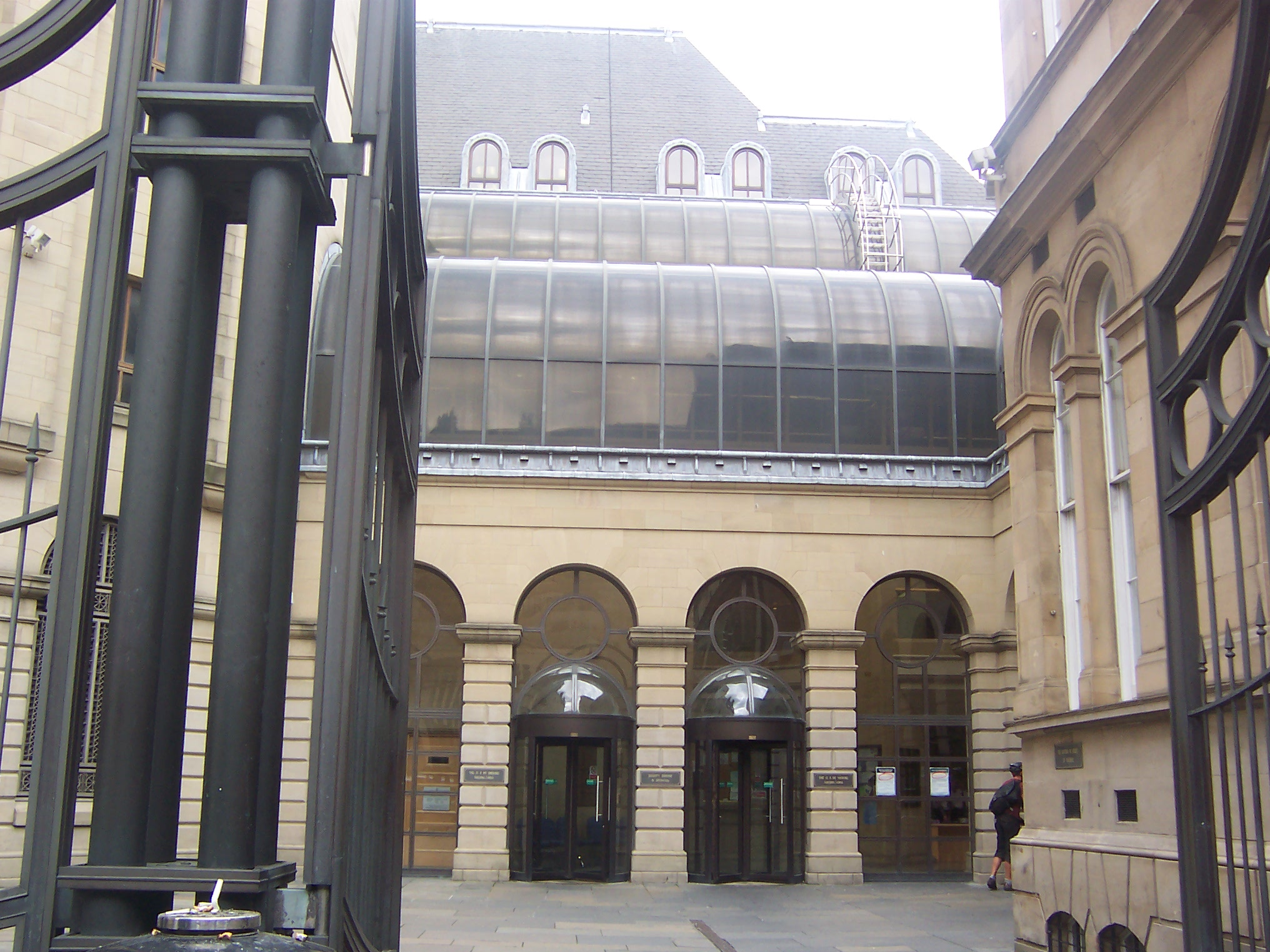
The main Sheriff Court in Edinburgh.

As of 1 February 2015, there are 39 Sheriff Courts in Scotland. Some, in rural areas of Scotland, are small due to the sparse population. Courts such as those in the cities of Edinburgh and Glasgow have a large number of staff and can in one day deal with hundreds of cases. Glasgow Sheriff Court, for example, is the busiest Court in Europe.

Sheriffdom	Sheriff Principal	Sheriff Court
Glasgow and Strathkelvin	Sheriff Principal Aisha Anwar	Glasgow and Strathkelvin Sheriff Court
Grampian, Highlands and Islands	Sheriff Principal Andrew Miller	Aberdeen Sheriff Court
Grampian, Highlands and Islands	Sheriff Principal Andrew Miller	Banff Sheriff Court
Grampian, Highlands and Islands	Sheriff Principal Andrew Miller	Elgin Sheriff Court
Grampian, Highlands and Islands	Sheriff Principal Andrew Miller	Fort William Sheriff Court
Grampian, Highlands and Islands	Sheriff Principal Andrew Miller	Inverness Sheriff Court
Grampian, Highlands and Islands	Sheriff Principal Andrew Miller	Kirkwall Sheriff Court
Grampian, Highlands and Islands	Sheriff Principal Andrew Miller	Lerwick Sheriff Court
Grampian, Highlands and Islands	Sheriff Principal Andrew Miller	Lochmaddy Sheriff Court
Grampian, Highlands and Islands	Sheriff Principal Andrew Miller	Peterhead Sheriff Court
Grampian, Highlands and Islands	Sheriff Principal Andrew Miller	Portree Sheriff Court
Grampian, Highlands and Islands	Sheriff Principal Andrew Miller	Stornoway Sheriff Court
Grampian, Highlands and Islands	Sheriff Principal Andrew Miller	Tain Sheriff Court
Grampian, Highlands and Islands	Sheriff Principal Andrew Miller	Wick Sheriff Court
Lothian and Borders	Sheriff Principal Nigel Ross	Edinburgh Sheriff Court
Lothian and Borders	Sheriff Principal Nigel Ross	Jedburgh Sheriff Court
Lothian and Borders	Sheriff Principal Nigel Ross	Livingston Sheriff Court
Lothian and Borders	Sheriff Principal Nigel Ross	Selkirk Sheriff Court
North Strathclyde	Sheriff Principal Sean Murphy KC	Campbeltown Sheriff Court
North Strathclyde	Sheriff Principal Sean Murphy KC	Dumbarton Sheriff Court
North Strathclyde	Sheriff Principal Sean Murphy KC	Dunoon Sheriff Court
North Strathclyde	Sheriff Principal Sean Murphy KC	Greenock Sheriff Court
North Strathclyde	Sheriff Principal Sean Murphy KC	Kilmarnock Sheriff Court
North Strathclyde	Sheriff Principal Sean Murphy KC	Oban Sheriff Court
North Strathclyde	Sheriff Principal Sean Murphy KC	Paisley Sheriff Court
South Strathclyde, Dumfries and Galloway	Sheriff Principal Kate Dowdalls	Airdrie Sheriff Court
South Strathclyde, Dumfries and Galloway	Sheriff Principal Kate Dowdalls	Ayr Sheriff Court
South Strathclyde, Dumfries and Galloway	Sheriff Principal Kate Dowdalls	Dumfries Sheriff Court
South Strathclyde, Dumfries and Galloway	Sheriff Principal Kate Dowdalls	Hamilton Sheriff Court
South Strathclyde, Dumfries and Galloway	Sheriff Principal Kate Dowdalls	Lanark Sheriff Court
South Strathclyde, Dumfries and Galloway	Sheriff Principal Kate Dowdalls	Stranraer Sheriff Court
Tayside Central and Fife	Sheriff Principal Gillian Wade KC	Alloa Sheriff Court
Tayside Central and Fife	Sheriff Principal Gillian Wade KC	Dundee Sheriff Court
Tayside Central and Fife	Sheriff Principal Gillian Wade KC	Dunfermline Sheriff Court
Tayside Central and Fife	Sheriff Principal Gillian Wade KC	Falkirk Sheriff Court
Tayside Central and Fife	Sheriff Principal Gillian Wade KC	Forfar Sheriff Court
Tayside Central and Fife	Sheriff Principal Gillian Wade KC	Kirkcaldy Sheriff Court
Tayside Central and Fife	Sheriff Principal Gillian Wade KC	Perth Sheriff Court
Tayside Central and Fife	Sheriff Principal Gillian Wade KC	Stirling Sheriff Court

== Relationship to other courts ==
Sheriff Courts are above local Justice of the Peace Courts who deal with very minor offences and below the Supreme Courts. The High Court of Justiciary deals with serious criminal matters, such as murder, rape and treason, and the Court of Session is Scotland's supreme civil court.

Any final decision of a Sheriff may be appealed. On 1 January 2016 the right of appeal to the Sheriff Principal was abolished and instead an appeal lies to the newly created Sheriff Appeal Court. All Criminal decisions were formally appealed to the High Court of Justiciary, but as of 22 September 2015 appeals in summary cases and appeals against bail decisions go to the Sheriff Appeal Court with appeals from Solemn cases going to the High Court of Justiciary.

== Reform of civil procedure ==
In 2009 Lord Gill, the Lord Justice Clerk, delivered his Scottish Civil Courts Review which was heralded as the "most far-reaching reform of Scotland's civil justice system in nearly two centuries".

Among his 206 proposals were:

- a major shift of work from the Court of Session to sheriff courts,
- removal of the jurisdictional overlap between those courts,
- specialisation of sheriffs in areas such as family law, commerce, personal injury,
- new district judges to deal with less legally complicated and low-value civil actions such as small claims and housing disputes.

In November 2010 the Scottish Government released its response to the Review accepting "the majority of Lord Gill's recommendations" including expressly the following proposals:

- "Civil court business should be reallocated to more appropriate levels, with a far greater proportion of civil court business to be heard by the sheriff courts
- "A specialised personal injury court should be established as part of Edinburgh Sheriff Court
- "The creation of a new Sheriff Appeal Court
- "The introduction of a new role of District Judge
- "Adoption of an improved and more active approach to case management
- "The introduction of designated specialist judges"

In October 2011, the Scottish Government announced consultation on appointments to a new Scottish Civil Justice Council to draft rules of procedure for civil proceedings in the Court of Session and sheriff court. The establishment of the council was one of Lord Gill's 2009 recommendations. The new Scottish Civil Justice Council was formally established on 28 May 2013.

== See also ==
- Courts of Scotland
- Scots law
- Sheriff-substitute
