= Scots civil procedure =

Scots civil procedure governs the rules of civil procedure in Scotland. It deals with the jurisdiction of the country's civil courts, namely the Court of Session and sheriff courts.

Civil procedure is regulated by Acts of Sederunt which are ordinances passed by the Court of Session. Rules for the functioning of the Court of Session were decided upon by the Court of Session Rules Council, which was instituted by the Administration of Justice (Scotland) Act 1933 and reconfirmed by the Court of Session Act 1988 and those for the Sheriff Court were agreed on by the Sheriff Court Rules Council, which is the body responsible for reviewing the Sheriff Court civil procedure under review. Primary legislation may also be enacted to regulate civil procedure, such as the Civil Evidence (Scotland) Act 1988 which removed requirements for corroborating evidence. However, rules for both the Court of Session and sheriff courts are now decided upon by the Scottish Civil Justice Council.

Since the enactment of the Human Rights Act 1998, civil procedure has increasingly been shaped by case law from the European Court of Human Rights.

== Proposed reform of civil procedure ==
In 2009 Lord Gill, the Lord Justice Clerk, delivered his Scottish Civil Courts Review which was heralded as the "most far-reaching reform of Scotland's civil justice system in nearly two centuries".

Among his 206 proposals were:

- a major shift of work from the Court of Session to sheriff courts,
- removal of the jurisdictional overlap between those courts,
- specialisation of sheriffs in areas such as family law, commerce, personal injury,
- new district judges to deal with less legally complicated and low-value civil actions such as small claims and housing disputes.

In November 2010 the Scottish Government released its response to the Review accepting "the majority of Lord Gill's recommendations" including expressly the following proposals:

- "Civil court business should be reallocated to more appropriate levels, with a far greater proportion of civil court business to be heard by the sheriff courts
- "A specialised personal injury court should be established as part of Edinburgh Sheriff Court
- "The creation of a new Sheriff Appeal Court
- "The introduction of a new role of District Judge
- "Adoption of an improved and more active approach to case management
- "The introduction of designated specialist judges"

In October 2011, the Scottish Government announced consultation on appointments to a new Scottish Civil Justice Council to draft rules of procedure for civil proceedings in the Court of Session and sheriff court. The establishment of the council was one of Lord Gill's 2009 recommendations.

== See also ==
- Judiciary of Scotland
- Trial by jury in Scotland
- Lands Valuation Appeal Court
