= Lands Valuation Appeal Court =

Scottish civil court

The Lands Valuation Appeal Court is a Scottish civil court, composed of 3 Court of Session judges. It hears cases where the decision of a local Valuation Appeal Committee is disputed.

== See also ==
- Judiciary of Scotland
- Scots civil procedure
