= JCR =

JCR may refer to:

== Persons ==
- Jamal Campbell-Ryce, a Jamaican international footballer

== Publications ==
- Journal of Chinese Religions
- Journal Citation Reports
- Journal of Conflict Resolution, an academic journal that publishes scholarly articles and book reviews dealing with international conflict and conflict resolution
- Journal of Consumer Research

== Others ==
- Japan Credit Rating Agency, a Japanese financial services company
- Java Content Repository, the content repository API for Java programming language
- Jewish Cultural Reconstruction, Inc., 1947–1952
- Judicial Complaints Reviewer, reviews complaints regarding members of the Scottish judiciary
- Junior common room or junior combination room, a type of university common room
- Junta Coordinadora Revolucionaria (Revolutionary Coordinating Junta), 1970s urban guerrilla communist parties in South America
- Jeunesse communiste révolutionnaire, a French Trotskyist organisation founded after the dissolution of the Union of Communist Students
