= Lords of Council and Session =

The Lords of Council and Session comprise the most senior body of Scottish judges:

- Privy Council of Scotland, up to 1532
- Court of Session, 1532–present
- Inner House, 1810–present
