= Justice Secretary =

Justice Secretary can refer to:

- Cabinet Secretary for Justice, Scotland
- Secretary for Justice, Hong Kong
- Secretary of Justice (Philippines)
- Secretary of State for Justice, United Kingdom

== See also ==
- Justice minister
