= Cabinet Secretary for Justice =

Scottish government cabinet minister

Scotland Cabinet Secretary for Justice
- Scottish Gaelic: Rùnaire a’ Chaibineit airson Ceartas

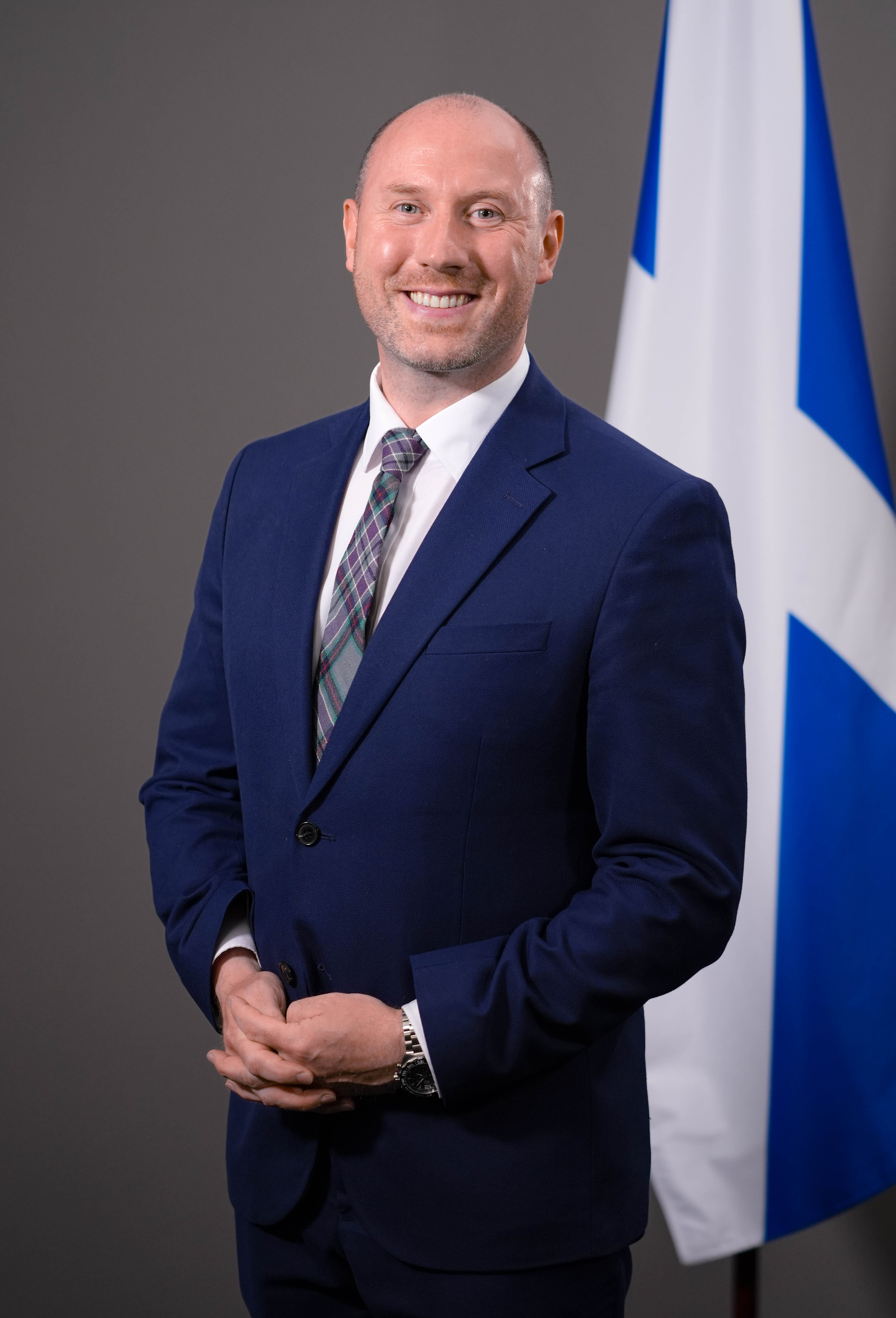
- Incumbent; Neil Gray since 20 May 2026
- Justice Directorate; Scottish Government; Scottish Cabinet
- Style: Cabinet Secretary (within parliament); Justice Secretary (informal); Scottish Justice Secretary (outwith Scotland)
- Member of: Scottish Cabinet
- Reports to: Scottish Parliament
- Seat: Edinburgh
- Appointer: First Minister of Scotland
- Inaugural holder: Jim Wallace; Minister for Justice
- Formation: 19 May 1999
- Deputy: Minister for Victims and Community Safety
- Salary: £118,511 per annum (2023) (including £67,662 MSP salary)
- Website: www.gov.scot

The Cabinet Secretary for Justice (Scottish Gaelic: Rùnaire a’ Chaibineit airson Ceartas), commonly referred to as the Justice Secretary (Scottish Gaelic: Rùnaire a' Cheartais), is a position in the cabinet of the Scottish Government. The Cabinet Secretary has overall responsibility for law and order in Scotland. The current Cabinet Secretary for Justice is Neil Gray, who was appointed in May 2026.

The Cabinet Secretary is assisted by the Minister for Victims and Community Safety, Siobhian Brown.

== History ==
The position was created in 1999 as the Minister for Justice, with the advent of devolution and the institution of the Scottish Parliament, taking over some of the roles and functions of the former Scottish Office Minister of State for Home Affairs that existed prior to 1999.

As with the UK Secretary of State for Justice, but unlike some other justice ministers, the Cabinet Secretary does not have any oversight of prosecutions - in Scotland these are handled by the Lord Advocate.

== Overview ==
=== Responsibilities ===
The responsibilities of the Cabinet Secretary for Justice include:

- Policing
- Fire and rescue services
- Courts & sentencing
- The justice system and criminal law procedure
- Violence reduction
- Prison reform and prisoner policy
- Reducing reoffending
- Security
- Youth justice
- Access to justice
- Civil law
- Victim/witness support
- Criminal injuries compensation
- Legal aid fund
- Scottish Courts and Tribunals Service
- Bairn's Hoose
- Justice reform
- National Community Justice Strategy
- Veterans

=== Public bodies ===
The following public bodies report to the Cabinet Secretary for Justice:

- Disclosure Scotland
- Judicial Appointments Board for Scotland
- Judicial Complaints Reviewer
- Parole Board for Scotland
- Police Investigations and Review Commissioner
- Risk Management Authority
- Scottish Courts and Tribunals Service
- Scottish Criminal Cases Review Commission
- Scottish Fire and Rescue Service
- Scottish Law Commission
- Scottish Legal Aid Board
- Scottish Legal Complaints Commission
- Scottish Police Authority
- Scottish Prison Service
- Scottish Social Services Council

=== Salary ===
The Cabinet Secretary for Justice is paid a total salary of £112,919, which is made up of £64,470 for being a MSP, and an additional allowance of £48,449 for the responsibility of being a Cabinet Secretary.

== List of office holders ==
=== Minister for Justice ===
Name	Portrait	Entered office	Left office	Party	First Minister
Jim Wallace		19 May 1999	21 May 2003	Liberal Democrats	Donald Dewar; Henry McLeish; Jack McConnell
Cathy Jamieson		21 May 2003	17 May 2007	Scottish Labour	Jack McConnell
=== Cabinet Secretary for Justice ===
Kenny MacAskill		17 May 2007	21 November 2014	Scottish National Party	Alex Salmond
Michael Matheson		21 November 2014	26 June 2018	Scottish National Party	Nicola Sturgeon
Humza Yousaf		26 June 2018	19 May 2021	Scottish National Party	Nicola Sturgeon
Keith Brown		20 May 2021	29 March 2023	Scottish National Party	Nicola Sturgeon
=== Cabinet Secretary for Justice and Home Affairs ===
Angela Constance		29 March 2023	20 May 2026	Scottish National Party	Humza Yousaf; John Swinney
=== Cabinet Secretary for Justice ===
Neil Gray		20 May 2026	Incumbent	Scottish National Party	John Swinney

== See also ==
- Politics of Scotland
- Scottish Government
- Scottish Parliament
