= Sheriff =

Government official in some countries with historical ties to England

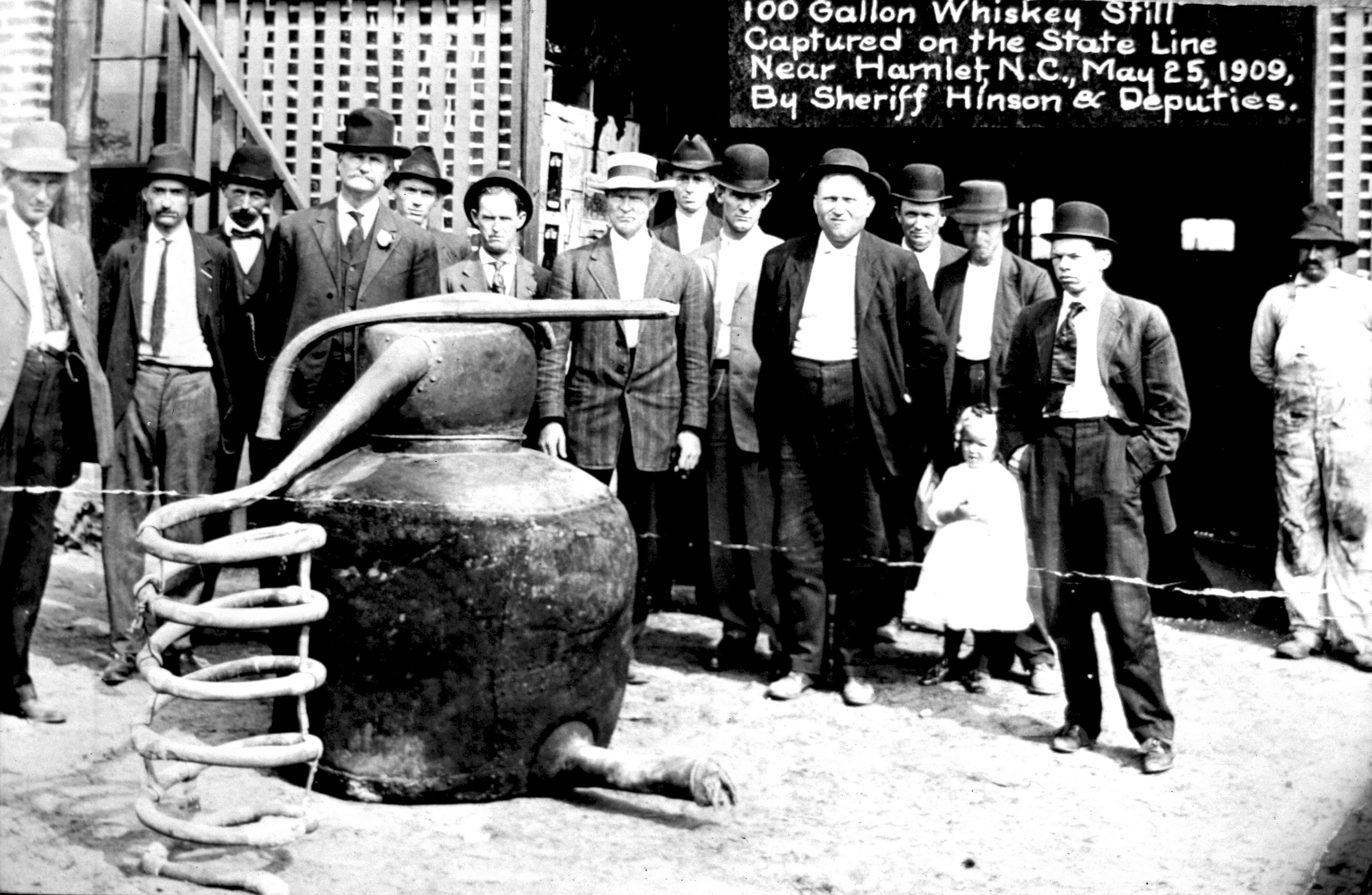
A sheriff's department poses with an illegal still (Hamlet, North Carolina; 1909)

A sheriff is a government official, with varying duties, existing in some countries with historical ties to England where the office originated. There is an analogous, although independently developed, office in Iceland and the Faroe Islands, the sýslumaður, which is commonly translated to English as sheriff.

== Description ==
Currently in Britain, the political or legal office of a sheriff, term of office of a sheriff, or jurisdiction of a sheriff, is called a shrievalty in England and Wales, and a sheriffdom in Scotland.

The specific combination of legal, political and ceremonial duties of a sheriff varies greatly from country to country.

- In England, Northern Ireland, or Wales, a sheriff (or high sheriff) is a ceremonial county or city official.
- In Scotland, sheriffs are judges.
- In the Republic of Ireland, in some counties and in the cities of Dublin and Cork, sheriffs are legal officials similar to bailiffs.
- In the United States, a sheriff is a sworn law enforcement officer whose duties vary across states and counties. A sheriff is generally an elected county official, with duties that typically include policing unincorporated areas, maintaining county jails, providing security to courts in the county, and (in some states) serving arrest warrants and court civil papers. In addition to these policing and correction services, a sheriff is often responsible for enforcing civil law within the jurisdiction.
- In Canada, sheriffs exist in various forms, with duties and powers depending on the province. In general, the provincial sheriff services manage and transport court prisoners and serve court orders. In some provinces, sheriffs provide security for the court system, protect public officials and support investigations by local police services. In Alberta, sheriffs perform various law enforcement duties in a supplementary capacity, such as traffic enforcement and responding to 9-1-1 calls in rural areas.
- In Australia and South Africa sheriffs are legal officials similar to bailiffs. In these countries there is no link maintained between counties and sheriffs.
- In India, a sheriff is a largely ceremonial office in a few major cities.

== Europe ==
=== United Kingdom ===
The Old English term designated a royal official, a reeve. Historically, they were responsible for managing a shire or county on behalf of the king. The term is a contraction of "shire reeve" (Old English scīrgerefa).

The sheriff had a series of duties that included keeping the peace and providing men at arms to support the king in times of strife. Another important duty was the collection of taxes on behalf of the crown. This process involved each division of the county (known as the hundred) paying geld (a form of land tax). To assess how much people had to pay, a clerk and a knight were sent by the king to each county. They sat with the sheriff of the county and with a select group of local knights (two knights from each hundred). After it was determined what geld was to be paid, the knights of the hundred and the bailiff of the hundred were responsible for getting the money to the sheriff, and the sheriff was responsible for getting the money to the Exchequer.

Sheriffs loyal to certain nobles could and did sabotage the careers of knights against whom they, or a noble they were loyal to, bore a grudge. Groups of sheriffs with significant connections had more de facto power in the legal system than most English knights, despite their lack of land.

The term and duties were preserved in England even after the Norman Conquest. However, in England, Wales, and Northern Ireland, the role evolved over the centuries. In modern times the sheriff or high sheriff is a ceremonial county or city official. Some commercial organisations use the term to refer to High Court enforcement officers, who were known as sheriff's officers prior to 2004.

In England and Wales, there are 15 towns and cities that retain the office of sheriff – Berwick-upon-Tweed, Canterbury, Carmarthen, Chester, Gloucester, Haverfordwest, Lichfield, Lincoln, Newcastle, Norwich, Nottingham, Oxford, Poole, Southampton and York.

The National Association of City and Town Sheriffs of England and Wales (NACTSEW) was founded in 1985 by the then Sheriff of Gloucester, Andrew Gravells. Its aim is to "preserve, enhance and promote the ancient office of City and Town Sheriffs of England and Wales".

==== Scotland ====
In Scotland the sheriff is a judicial office holder in the sheriff courts, and are members of the judiciary of Scotland.

===== Sheriffs principal =====
The most senior sheriffs are the sheriffs principal, who have administrative as well as judicial authority in the six sheriffdoms, and are responsible for the effective running and administration of all the sheriff courts in their jurisdiction. Sheriffs principal also sit as appeal sheriffs in the Sheriff Appeal Court; hearing appeals against sentencing and conviction from summary trials in the sheriff courts and justice of the peace courts. The additional duties of a sheriff principal include being Commissioners of the Northern Lighthouse Board (which is the general lighthouse authority for Scotland), and chairing local criminal justice boards which bring together local representatives of procurator fiscal, Police Scotland and Community Justice Scotland, and Scottish Courts and Tribunals Service.

===== Sheriffs =====
Sheriffs deal with the majority of civil and criminal court cases in Scotland, with the power to preside in solemn proceedings with a jury of 15 for indictable offences and sitting alone in summary proceedings for summary offences. A sheriff must be legally qualified, and have been qualified as an advocate or solicitor for at least 10 years. The maximum sentencing power of sheriff in summary proceedings is 12 months imprisonment, or a fine of up to £10,000. In solemn proceedings the maximum sentence is 5 years imprisonment, or an unlimited fine.

Sheriffs also preside over fatal accident inquiries which are convened to examine the circumstances around sudden or suspicious deaths, including those who die in the course of employment, in custody, or in secure accommodation.

===== Summary sheriffs =====
Summary sheriffs hear civil cases brought under Simple Procedure and criminal cases brought under summary proceedings. Their sentencing powers are identical to a sheriff sitting in summary proceedings.

=== Republic of Ireland ===
In the Republic of Ireland, a sheriff (Irish: sirriam) is appointed under the Court Officers Act 1945, to perform some of the functions that would otherwise be performed by the county registrar. Eligibility to serve as sheriff requires five years' experience as either a sheriff's assistant, barrister, or solicitor. In practice, two types of sheriff have been appointed:

- Four sheriffs (one each for Dublin city, for County Dublin, for Cork city, and for County Cork), have three responsibilities:
  - executing tax certificates on behalf of the Revenue Commissioners to collect unpaid tax debts
  - enforcing court orders of the Circuit Court, such as eviction or, most importantly, debt collection for public or private creditors
  - acting as returning officer in public elections
- Fourteen sheriffs, colloquially called "Revenue sheriffs", have only the first of the preceding functions, the others being done by the county registrar's office. Revenue sheriffs are solicitors in private practice. Each covers a bailiwick consisting of one or more of the state's other 29 counties (excluding the four with full-time sheriffs). The 14 bailiwicks group the counties as follows: Carlow and Kildare; Cavan, Leitrim, Longford and Monaghan; Clare and Limerick; Donegal; Galway; Kerry; Kilkenny and Waterford; Laois, Offaly and Tipperary; Louth, Meath and Westmeath; Mayo; Roscommon and Sligo; and Wexford and Wicklow.

The Commission for Public Service Appointments recruits sheriffs but they are not public servants and are responsible for their own office and staff. Their main functions are debt collection, and they are paid fees specified by statutory instrument, as well as charging their own expenses to the debtor; they also receive a limited retainer from the state. They must lodge a security deposit on appointment to guard against fraud.

==== History ====
Prior to the 1922 creation of the Irish Free State, Irish law regarding sheriffs mirrored that of England, latterly with each administrative county and county borough having a ceremonial high sheriff and functional under-sheriffs responsible for enforcing court orders of the county court or quarter sessions. The Courts of Justice Act 1924 replaced these courts with the new Circuit Court. The Court Officers Act 1926 formally abolished high sheriffs and phased out under-sheriffs by providing that, as each retired, his functions would be transferred to the county registrar, established by the 1926 act as an officer of the Circuit Court. When the Dublin city under-sheriff retired in 1945, the city registrar was too overworked with other responsibilities to take over his duties, so the Court Officers Act 1945 was passed to allow a new office of sheriff to take over some or all of the under-sheriff's functions. The four Dublin and Cork sheriffs were soon appointed, with much of the under-sheriff's responsibilities. Revenue sheriffs were introduced for the rest of the state in the late 1980s as part of a crackdown on tax evasion. In 1993 the comptroller and auditor general expressed concern that funds collected and held in trust by sheriffs on behalf of the revenue commissioners were at risk of commingling. This was reformed in 1998 by prohibiting sheriffs from retaining the interest earned on such monies and, to compensate, increasing their retainer. Through to the 1990s the sheriff's post was in the gift of the minister for justice, but by the 2010s it was by advertised competition. A 1988 Law Reform Commission report made recommendations for updating the 1926 law on sheriffs; as of 2023 few of these had been implemented. The COVID-19 pandemic created problems for sheriffs recovering fees. The government formed a review group in 2023 which reported in 2024, recommending some changes but "retention of the office of sheriff as an effective debt enforcement mechanism".

== Asia ==
=== India ===
Among cities in India, only Mumbai (Bombay), Kolkata (Calcutta) and Chennai (Madras), the three former British presidencies, have had sheriffs. First established in the 18th century based on the English high sheriffs, they were the executive arm of the judiciary, responsible for assembling jurors, bringing people to trial, supervising the gaoling (imprisonment) of prisoners and seizing and selling property. After the mid-19th century the responsibilities and powers of the role were reduced and the positions became ceremonial. The sheriffs of Mumbai and Kolkata still exist, although the post in Chennai was abolished in 1998.

In present times the sheriff has an apolitical, non-executive role, presides over various city-related functions and conferences and welcomes foreign guests. The post is second to the mayor in the protocol list.

=== Philippines ===
In the Philippines, a former colony of the United States, the office of sheriff also exists. The duties of a sheriff are to primarily serve all writs, execute all processes, and carry into effect all decisions and orders issued by the courts. Sheriffs execute process without attempting to determine their validity.

== Oceania ==
=== Australia ===
A sheriff's office exists in multiple Australian states and territories, with various duties.

- Before 1824, prisons in the British penal colony of New South Wales were overseen by the provost marshal. This title/position was replaced by that of sheriff when a charter of justice was proclaimed in 1824. In addition to detaining accused criminals awaiting trial, the sheriff executed death sentences and other sentences, controlled gaols, and handled prison movements, including the chain gangs that worked on Goat Island and in Sydney. In 1867, the sheriff began to be replaced by an independent prisons department, led by an inspector general, which was later renamed comptroller general. Most Australian states adopted this mode of prison oversight for many years. In New South Wales, the office of the sheriff is part of Courts and Tribunal Services. The office has more than 400 employees at 58 sheriffs' offices. In addition to enforcing writs, warrants, and property seizure orders issued by New South Wales courts and tribunals, the office of the sheriff also provides court security and administers the state's jury service.
- In Victoria, the sheriff's office is part of the Victoria Department of Justice and Regulation. The office enforces warrants and orders issued by Victoria courts dealing with unpaid fines (in criminal matters) and unpaid money judgments (in civil matters). The Victoria sheriff's office has various enforcement powers against judgment debtors; they may seize and sell a debtor's assets to satisfy a judgment, place a wheel clamp on a debtor's car, or direct VicRoads to suspend a debtor's driver's license or vehicle registration.
- The Sheriff of Western Australia – also known as the Sheriff of the Supreme Court, Marshal of the Family Court and Marshal of the Federal Court in Western Australia – is an officer of those courts, as well as the District Court and the Magistrates Court. The sheriff has two main roles.
  - Enforcement services: managing the serving of court documents, including summonses, and the execution of writs, warrants and orders to recover unpaid fines or debts resulting from court judgments; as such, the sheriff is also responsible for the appointment of bailiffs – who carry out the above services on behalf of the sheriff.
  - Jury services: preparing jury books, which list people potentially available for jury duty, within 17 jury districts in Western Australia, as well as actually summoning people to act as jurors in the Supreme and District courts. The sheriff also investigates any failure by jurors to attend court and also has responsibility for the day-to-day management of juries sitting in the Perth metropolitan area.

=== New Zealand ===
Sheriffs in New Zealand are officers of the Superior Courts and function as the executive arm of these courts. The role of sheriff is automatically given to anyone who has gained the position of Registrar of the High Court.

== North America ==
=== Canada ===
Every province and territory in Canada operates a sheriffs service. In most of Canada, sheriffs are almost exclusively concerned with courtroom security, post-arrest offender transfer, the serving of legal processes, and the execution of civil judgments. Regardless of their exact duties, sheriffs, sheriff's deputies, and sheriffs officers are considered under "peace officers" in the Criminal Code.

==== Alberta ====
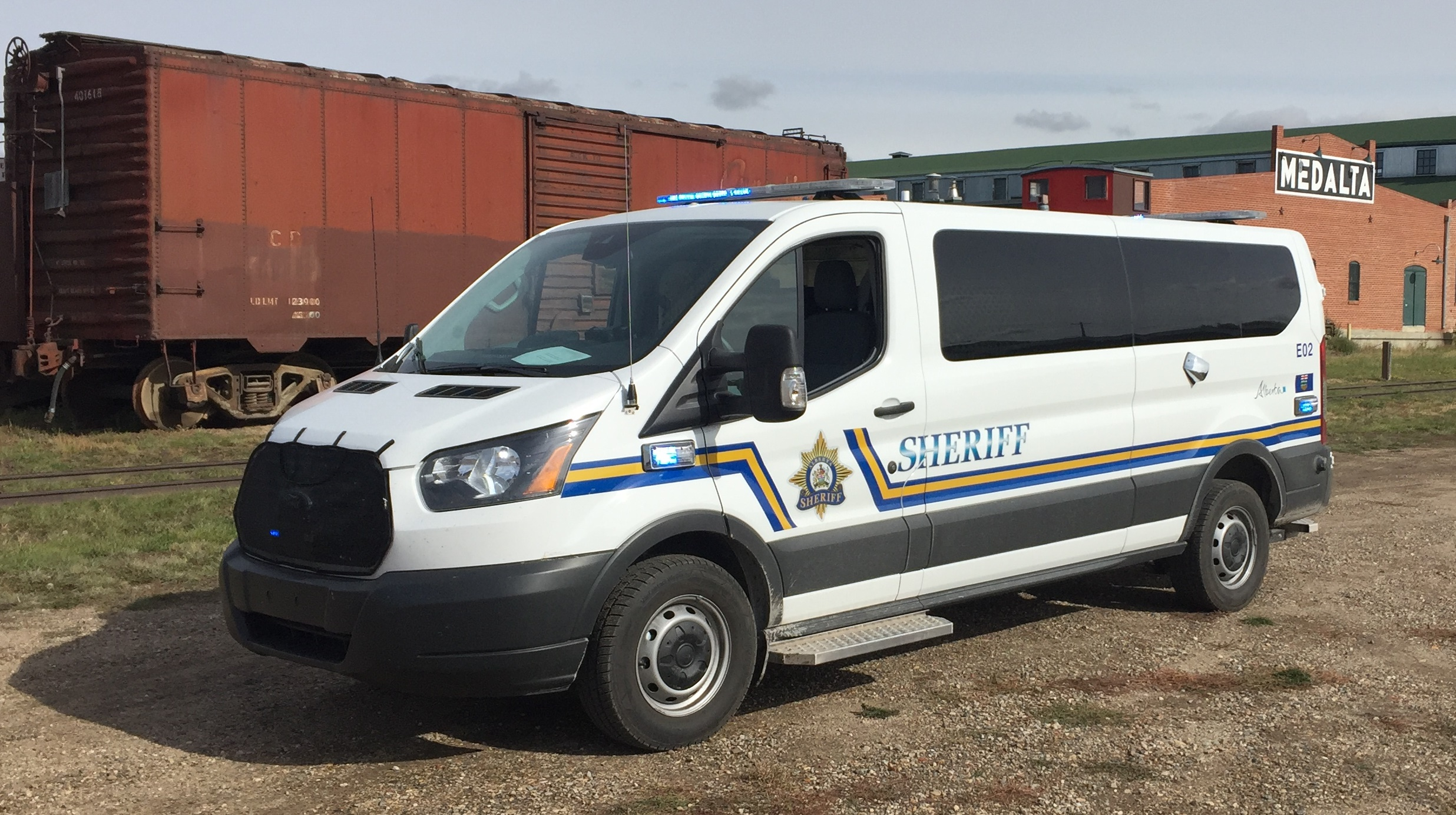
A prisoner transport van used by the Alberta Sheriffs Branch

The Alberta Sheriffs Branch is responsible for courtroom and legislative security, offender transport, commercial vehicle safety and enforcement, and fish and wildlife enforcement. In addition to this broad mandate, the Branch operates a highway patrol, which supplements local and RCMP policing on provincial highways.

In 2019, sheriffs began to respond to 9-1-1 calls in rural areas to assist the RCMP and local police services in responding to rural crime concerns. In 2023, the province piloted a program that saw sheriffs patrol alongside municipal police officers in Calgary and Edmonton.

==== British Columbia ====
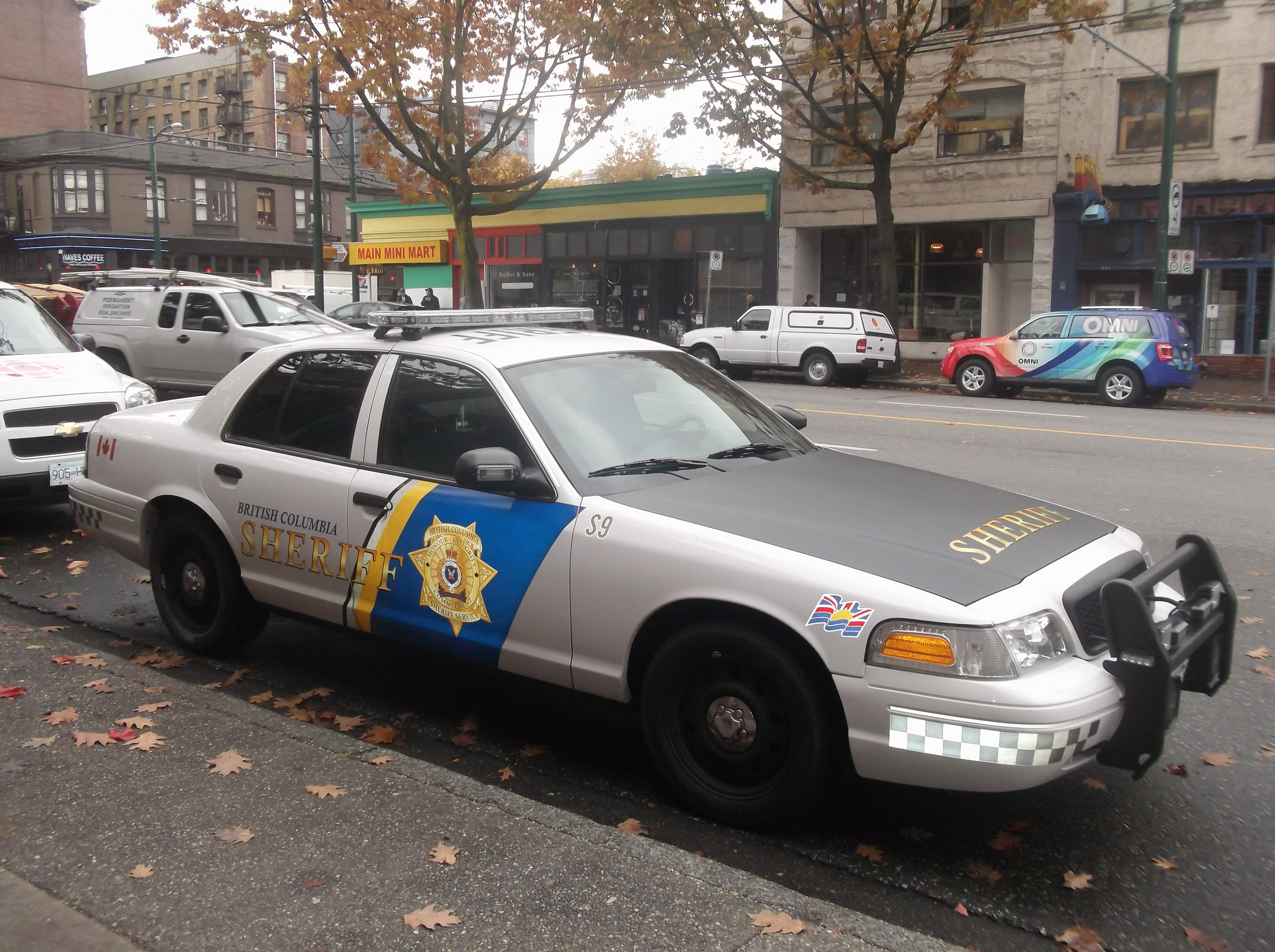
A British Columbia Sheriff Service Ford Crown Victoria Police Interceptor

The British Columbia Sheriff Service is responsible for courtroom security and offender transport.

The issuance of court orders is the responsibility of court bailiffs. These services are contracted out to private civil law enforcement firms.

==== Newfoundland and Labrador ====
The Office of the High Sheriff of Newfoundland and Labrador provides protection and enforcement duties in support of the provincial, supreme, and appeal courts in the province. The sheriffs also assists local law enforcement agencies with additional resources to ensure public safety under the provincial Emergency Preparedness Program.

==== Nova Scotia ====
In Nova Scotia, the Nova Scotia Sheriff Services focuses on the safety and security of the judiciary, court staff, the public, and persons in custody. There are local sheriffs for every county in Nova Scotia, numbering over 200 in total. They work with up to 20,000 inmates and travel over 2 million kilometres in a year. Sheriffs are responsible for: court security; the transportation of prisoners to and from institutions and all levels of court; the service of some civil and criminal documents; and the execution of court orders.

==== Ontario ====
In Ontario, sheriffs are part of the Enforcement Office in the Superior Court of Justice, which was previously named (and is still sometimes referred to as) the Sheriff's Office. They are mainly responsible for issuing and enforcing writs of the court, such as in jury selection, debt collection and evictions. Courtroom security and offender transport services are provided by local police services or, where none exists, the Ontario Provincial Police.

==== Quebec ====
Sheriffs (shérifs) are responsible for the jury selection process. They handle court orders, orders, and writs while they are involved in seizure and sale of property.

Court security is the responsibility of armed provincial special constables, while offender transport is the responsibility of the province's correction service.

=== United States ===
The sheriff is most often an elected county official who serves as the chief civilian law enforcement officer of their jurisdiction. The sheriff enforces court orders and mandates and may perform duties such as evictions, asset and property seizure pursuant to court orders, serving arrest warrants and legal papers. In some counties where urban areas have their own police departments, a sheriff may be restricted to civil procedure enforcement duties, while in other counties, the sheriff may serve as the principal police force and have jurisdiction over all of the county's municipalities, including those that maintain their own county police departments. A sheriff often administers the county jails and is responsible for court security functions within their jurisdiction. The office of sheriff as county official in colonial North America is recorded from the 1640s. In the modern United States, the scope of a sheriff varies across states and counties (which in Louisiana are called "parishes" and in Alaska "boroughs").

== South Africa ==
In South Africa, the sheriffs are officers of the court and function as They are responsible for serving court processes like summonses and subpoenas. They play an important role in the execution of court orders like the attachments of immovable and movable property; evictions, demolitions etc.

The Sheriffs Act 90 of 1986, which came into operation on 1 March 1990, governs the profession. A sheriff is appointed by the Minister for Justice and Constitutional Development in terms of Section 2 of the Act.

== Related offices ==
=== Norway ===
In Norway until 2021 there was the office of lensmann, which in their mostly rural police districts had functions similar to those of a US sheriff, consisting of the duties of both criminal law enforcement, and civil administration duties.

The lensmann was directly subordinate to the fylkesmann (county governor) until 1994, when the office became subordinate to the local chief of police (politimester). In 2000, a lot of civilian duties were transferred to the regular police (politi), and much of the difference between the politi and lensmann disappeared. The office is now called politistasjonssjef (police station chief), or in some placespolitiavdelingssjef (police unit chief).

Because the police has taken over most typical 'sheriffs' duties from the year 2000 onwards, there is no longer a difference between the former rank of a "sheriff's deputy" (lensmannsbetjent) and that of a regular police officer (politibetjent).

The lensmann has been elected by the municipal council since the year 1293, but was nominated by the sysselmann, the appointed governor.

=== Iceland ===
In Iceland, sýslumenn (singular sýslumaður, translated "sheriff") are administrators of the state, holders of the executive power in their jurisdiction and heads of their Sheriff's Office. Sheriffs are in charge of certain legal matters that typically involve registration of some sort and executing the orders of the court. The duties of the sheriffs differ slightly depending on their jurisdiction but they can be broadly categorised as:

- Duties of all sheriffs: marital matters (such as general registration of marital status and performing civil marriages), statutory matters, inheritance matters and more.
- Duties of all sheriffs except in Reykjavík: collection of public fees, publication of licences and permits for various personal and business purposes and more.
- Special duties of some sheriffs: in some jurisdictions the sheriff is also the commissioner of police.

There are 24 sheriffs and sheriff jurisdictions in Iceland. The jurisdictions are not defined by the administrative divisions of Iceland but are mainly a mixture of counties and municipalities.

The post of sheriff was mandated by the Old Covenant, an agreement between the Icelandic Commonwealth and the Kingdom of Norway. The agreement which was ratified between 1262 and 1264 makes the post of sheriff the oldest secular position of government still operating in Iceland.

== Deputy sheriff ==
A deputy sheriff is someone who answers to the sheriff and does the same duties as them.

== See also ==
- Constable
- Marshal
- Police
- Sheriff of Nottingham

== Sources ==
- Sheriff Review Group (April 2024). "Report" (PDF). Dublin: Department of Justice.
