= Judicial Complaints Reviewer =

- Incumbent; James Mollison since 1 September 2022
- Type: Ombudsman
- Appointer: Cabinet Secretary for Justice
- Constituting instrument: Judiciary and Courts (Scotland) Act 2008
- Formation: 2011
- First holder: Moi Ali
- Website: http://www.judicialcomplaintsreviewer.org.uk/

The Judicial Complaints Reviewer is a Scottish official who is responsible for reviewing the handling of complaints against the judiciary of Scotland by the Judicial Office for Scotland. The post was established in 2011 as a result of the Judiciary and Courts (Scotland) Act 2008. The Reviewer is appointed by the Cabinet Secretary for Justice, with the approval of the Lord President of the Court of Session. The Reviewer's services are open to those who have complained about the conduct of a member of the judiciary, and also to members of the judiciary who have been the subject of a complaint.

The first Judicial Complaints Reviewer was Moi Ali, 2011-2014. The second was Gillian Thompson, 2014-2017. The third was Ian Gordon OBE, 2017-2022. The current reviewer is James Mollison who took up the role on 1 September 2022.

== Remit and jurisdiction ==
Complaints about the conduct, both within and outwith the courts of Scotland, of judicial officer holders in Scotland are made to the Lord President through the Judicial Office for Scotland. However, the Judicial Office does not consider complaints about judicial decisions which are dealt with through appeals.

The office of the Judicial Complaints Reviewer was established by Section 30 of the Judiciary and Courts (Scotland) Act 2008 The Reviewer's role is to review how complaints regarding members of the judiciary have been handled by the Judicial Office for Scotland in accordance with the complaint rules laid down by the Lord President. As of May 2017, complaints should be handled in line with Complaints About the Judiciary (Scotland) Rules 2017. She cannot change the outcome of the investigation, overturn a decision, or initiate redress. However, where she finds a fault in the process she passes a referral to the Lord President who then makes decision.

== Judicial Complaints Reviewer ==
Moi Ali became the first ever JCR on 1 September 2011. She established the office and pushed for greater powers, claiming that the role was "window-dressing" and the judicial watchdog had no teeth. She did not seek reappointment after the end of her three-year term, as she was dissatisfied with the powers of the role. Gillian Thompson became the second Judicial Complaints Reviewer on 1 September 2014, and she too did not serve a second term of office.
