= Sheriff-substitute =

In the Courts of Scotland, sheriff-substitute was the historical name for the judges who sit in the local sheriff courts under the direction of the sheriffs principal; from 1971 the sheriffs substitute were renamed simply as sheriff. When researching the history of the sheriffs and sheriffs principal of Scotland there is much confusion over the use of different names to refer to sheriffs in Scotland. Sheriffs principal are those sheriffs who have held office over a sheriffdom, whether through inheritance or through direct appointment by the Crown. Thus, hereditary sheriff (before 1746) and sheriff-depute (after 1746) are the precursors to the modern office of sheriff principal.

== Background ==
The office of sheriff in Scotland is an ancient one, owing its origins to the practice of the King of Scots to appoint leading local magnates to hear disputes between his subjects. In many cases, the office of sheriff became hereditary, a practice strengthened by the clan-based social system that prevailed in parts of Scotland such as the Highlands. As the complexity of the law grew, and its administration began to require specialist knowledge and training, an increasingly common practice was for the hereditary sheriff, usually a layman, to appoint a sheriff-depute to hear cases on his behalf. Because the same sheriff-depute might be appointed to assist several different sheriffs, he in turn would appoint a sheriff-substitute to act in his place when he was unavailable to sit in a particular court.

In the aftermath of the Jacobite rising of 1745, the British government abolished heritable jurisdictions throughout Scotland, including the office of hereditary sheriff. In most cases, the sheriffs-deputes came to formally assume the responsibilities they had already been discharging. The title of sheriff-depute soon fell into disuse, being shortened simply to "sheriff". A local judge appointed by the sheriff would continue to be called a sheriff-substitute.

In the latter part of the 20th century, the titles of sheriff and sheriff-substitute were replaced by sheriff principal and sheriff respectively:

Sheriff Courts (Scotland) Act 1971. c. 58. Part I. Sheriffs Principal and Sheriffs, Section 4:

Offices of Sheriff Principal and Sheriff:
(1) The office of sheriff (that is to say, the office known formerly as the office of sheriff depute, but known immediately before the commencement of this Act as the office of sheriff) shall be known as the office of sheriff principal, the office of sheriff substitute shall be known as the office of sheriff, and the office of honorary sheriff substitute shall be known as the office of honorary sheriff.

== See also ==
- Courts of Scotland
- Sheriff Court
- Sheriff Principal
- Scots law
