= Faculty of Advocates =

Independent body of lawyers in Scotland

- Formation: 1532
- Headquarters: Parliament House
- Location: Edinburgh, Scotland
- Members: 730
- Dean: Roddy Dunlop, KC
- Vice-Dean: Tony Lenehan, KC
- Parent organization: College of Justice
- Website: www.advocates.org.uk

The Faculty of Advocates (Scottish Gaelic: Dàmh an Luchd-tagraidh) is an independent body of lawyers who have been admitted to practise as advocates before the courts of Scotland, especially the Court of Session and the High Court of Justiciary. The Faculty of Advocates is a constituent part of the College of Justice and is based in Edinburgh.

Advocates are privileged to plead in any cause before any of the courts of Scotland, including the sheriff courts and district courts, where counsel are not excluded by statute.

== History ==
The Faculty has existed since 1532 when the College of Justice was set up by Act of the Parliament of Scotland, but its origins are believed to predate that event. No curriculum of study, residence or professional training was, until 1856, required on entering this profession, but the faculty always had the power of rejecting any candidate for admission. Subsequently candidates underwent two private examinations; one in general scholarship that could be substituted by evidence of an equivalent university degree, and the other, at the interval of a year, in Roman, private international and Scots law, along with evidence of having attended approved classes. For a long period the Faculty resisted reorganisation, until changes in admissions were introduced in 1960.

The first woman to be admitted to the faculty was Margaret Kidd in July 1923, who remained Scotland's only female advocate until 1948. Kidd served as Keeper of the Advocates' Library 1956–1969. In 2004 the first female vice-dean of the faculty was elected.

== Organisation and governance ==
The Faculty is led by the Dean of Faculty, who is elected by the whole membership. The post is currently held by Roddy Dunlop KC, who succeeded Gordon Jackson in July 2020. He is supported by the Vice-Dean, Treasurer, Clerk, Keeper of the Library and Chairman of Faculty Services Ltd, all of whom are also elected. The Dean regularly consults with Faculty Council, which is made up of elected and ex officio members.

The Faculty is self-regulating, but subject to the overriding supervision of the Lord President of the Court of Session, who delegates to it the task of preparing Intrants for admission as advocates. This task involves a process of examination and practical instruction known as devilling, during which intrants benefit from intensive structured training in the special skills of advocacy. No-one can be presented to the court as suitable to be a practising advocate without satisfying these training requirements. The Faculty also provides for its members an ongoing programme of talks, seminars and conferences covering a wide range of topics.

=== Free Legal Services Unit ===
Many Advocates and trainee advocates carry out work for the Free Legal Services Unit (FLSU). This is part of the Faculty's commitment to providing access to justice for everyone in society. The FLSU enables qualified persons to provide advice and representation to clients of accredited advice agencies (including CAS) across Scotland.

== Current membership ==
The Faculty includes practising and non-practising members. The current practising Bar includes an increasing proportion of women. Women make up approximately one quarter practising membership. Total numbers now stand at just over 460, of whom approximately one fifth are King's Counsel. The taking of Silk, as assumption of the title of King's Counsel is commonly known, depends upon the prerogative of His Majesty. This is exercised through the First Minister of Scotland upon the recommendation of the Lord Justice General. The Dean of Faculty is consulted in the course of this process. As a general rule, silk is awarded to experienced Counsel, who are considered to have achieved distinction in full-time practice. The process of awarding silk has been the subject of some criticism.

== Advocates Library ==
For more than 300 years, the Faculty has maintained within Parliament House the Advocates Library, often regarded as the finest working law library in the United Kingdom.

=== Range of materials ===
A comprehensive range of materials has been built up over the last three hundred years, and a modern library management system utilizing the latest technology ensures that the Advocates Library is able to meet the needs of members of the Faculty of Advocates. In addition, the library's stock is made available to others via the National Library of Scotland.

=== History ===
The Library was formally inaugurated in 1689. From the start the collection was a general one. In 1709 the status of the collection was confirmed when Queen Anne's Copyright Act gave the Keeper of the Library the right to claim a copy of every book published in the British Isles. The collection was enhanced by purchase and donation, particularly of continental imprints and of manuscripts.

The Advocates Library came to be recognised as the natural depository for literary materials of national importance. By the 1850s the Library had become in effect Scotland's national library. In 1925 the National Library of Scotland was established when the Faculty gifted to the nation its whole non-law collections comprising 750,000 books, pamphlets, manuscripts (notably those of Walter Scott), maps and sheet music. The Advocates Library has retained the copyright privilege for law publications.

In recent years the Advocates Library has expanded to take account of the increase in membership of the Faculty. Advances in technology have been embraced with the installation of a new library management system, incorporating an on-line catalogue, which further enhances the services the library offers.

== Deans of the Faculty of Advocates ==
The Dean of Faculty is the leader of the Faculty of Advocates. The Dean elected by the whole membership.

Since 2000, the following have served as Dean:

- 1997 to 2001: Nigel Emslie
- 2001 to 2004: Colin Campbell
- 2004 to 2007: Robert Logan "Roy" Martin
- 2007 to 2014: Richard Keen
- 2014 to 2016: James Wolffe
- 2016 to 2020: Gordon Jackson
- 2020 to present Roddy Dunlop

== See also ==
- Bar Council
- Inns of Court, a roughly equivalent body for England and Wales
- King's Inns, a roughly equivalent body for the Republic of Ireland

== References and sources ==
References
