= Parole Board for Scotland =

Non-departmental public body in Scotland

- Logo of the Parole Board for Scotland

Agency overview
- Formed: 1967; 59 years ago
- Type: tribunal non-departmental public body
- Jurisdiction: Scotland
- Headquarters: Saughton House, Broomhouse Drive, Edinburgh, EH11 3XD; 55.93489°N 3.18291°W
- Minister responsible: Keith Brown MSP, Cabinet Secretary for Justice
- Agency executives: John Watt, Chairman; Colin Spivey, Chief Executive
- Parent department: Justice Directorate of the Scottish Government
- Key document: Prisons (Scotland) Act 1989
- Website: www.scottishparoleboard.scot

Map
- Scotland in the UK and Europe

The Parole Board for Scotland (Scottish Gaelic: Bòrd Cead-saoraidh na h-Alba) is a tribunal non-departmental public body in Scotland first established in 1967, with responsibility for parole decisions. Its decision making and operating are independent of the Scottish Government, and many of its decisions are binding on Scottish Ministers. The Parole Board has statutory powers to:

- Recommend the release of prisoners with determinate sentences or extended sentences of 4 years or more (with licence where required);
- Direct the release of prisoners with life sentences on life licence;
- Recommend the conditions to be attached to prisoners' non-parole licences;
- Recommend the recall to prison, in the public interest, of anyone released on parole, non-parole or life licence;
- Direct the re-release of prisoners recalled to prison.

The Parole Board also has the power to advise the Scottish Ministers on additional conditions on prisoners' release licences, and it operates as appellate body for alleged breaches of Home Detention Curfew. The Parole Board can only make a determination where the Scottish Ministers refer a case.

Morag Slesser is the current chairperson having been appointed to that position on 12 October 2026.

== Remit and jurisdiction ==
=== Criminal justice system ===
The Parole Board is part of the criminal justice system in Scotland. It is a tribunal non-departmental public body which has a number of statutory functions but operates independently from the Scottish Government. It is responsible for making important decisions about the release and recall of long term prisoners, and for setting licence conditions for a range of prisoners to help manage their risk in the community on release.

=== Referral by Scottish Ministers ===
The Parole Board has no statutory powers to consider the case of a prisoner unless the case has been referred to it by Scottish Ministers. For each case it receives a range of information that has been prepared by relevant professionals including: a home background report, a prison social work report, a trial judge report (if available), and where appropriate psychological and/or psychiatric report, sentence management reports and prisoner misconduct reports.

=== Information considered ===
The Parole Board gives consideration to any information that it receives, including written comments that a victim of a crime can supply about the release of the offender (under the Victim Notification Scheme). Decisions made by the Board are intended to focus on the potential risk a prisoner might pose to the community.

== Evaluation ==
In 2011, an Audit Scotland review of Scotland’s criminal justice system noted that the Parole Board is sometimes limited in its ability to grant parole because of the lack of availability of rehabilitation programmes in prison.

== Legislation ==
Procedures around the release of prisoners sentenced on or after 1 October 1993 are detailed in the Prisoners and Criminal Proceedings (Scotland) Act 1993. The legislation covering the parole consideration in relation to these prisoners is set out in the Parole Board (Scotland) Rules 2022.

Appointments to the Board are regulated by the Office of the Commissioner for Public Appointments in Scotland. Morag Slesser was appointed as Chair person on 12 October 2026.

== See also ==
- Parole Board for England and Wales
