= District court (Scotland) =

District courts of Scotland
- Flag of Scotland
- Established: 1975
- Dissolved: 2010
- Jurisdiction: districts of Scotland
- Composition method: Appointed by Commission of the Peace for each district
- Authorised by: District Courts (Scotland) Act 1975
- Appeals to: High Court of Justiciary
- Judge term length: not specified
- Number of positions: Bench of either three lay justices of the peace, or one stipendiary magistrate

A district court was the least authoritative type of criminal court of Scotland. The courts operated under summary procedure and dealt primarily with minor criminal offences. The district courts were administered by the district councils established under the Local Government (Scotland) Act 1973. Following the passage of the Criminal Proceedings etc. (Reform) (Scotland) Act 2007 by the Scottish Parliament, the Scottish Ministers abolished the district courts and transferred their functions to the justice of the peace courts, which are administered by the Scottish Courts and Tribunals Service and subject to the authority of the Lord President of the Court of Session.

== History ==
=== Establishment ===
District courts were introduced in 1975 by the District Courts (Scotland) Act 1975, as part of the local government reorganisation process as a replacement for burgh police courts and sat in each local authority area under summary procedure only. The district courts were administered by the district council within whose jurisdiction it operated; the district councils were established under the Local Government (Scotland) Act 1973. Each court comprised one or more justices of the peace — lay magistrates appointed by the Secretary of State for Scotland and later the Scottish Government — who sat singly or in threes; a qualified legal assessor acted as clerk of court.

=== Abolition ===
The district courts was abolished in a rolling programme between 10 March 2008 and 22 February 2010, following the passage of the Criminal Proceedings etc. (Reform) (Scotland) Act 2007 by the Scottish Parliament. The 2007 Act enabled the Scottish Ministers to replace district courts by "justice of the peace courts". This allowed the Scottish Government to unify the administration of the sheriff courts and district courts in Scotland, but retaining lay justices of the peace. The new justice of the peace courts are managed by the Scottish Courts and Tribunals Service and are organised by sheriffdom. Responsibility for the Courts was transferred from the local authorities in a rolling programme of court unification that concluded in February 2010.

The district courts were replaced by justice of the peace courts by a series of Scottish statutory instruments as follows:

- Sheriffdom of Lothian and Borders, 10 March 2008
- Sheriffdom of Grampian, Highlands and Islands, 2 June 2008
- Sheriffdom of Glasgow and Strathkelvin, 8 December 2008
- Sheriffdom of Tayside, Central and Fife, 23 February 2009
- Sheriffdom of North Strathclyde, 14 December 2009
- Sheriffdom of South Strathclyde, Dumfries & Galloway, 22 February 2010

== Remit and jurisdiction ==
They handled many cases of breach of the peace, minor assaults, petty theft, and offences under the Civic Government (Scotland) Act 1982. However, they could handle any offence that could competently be dealt with under summary procedure. Their sentencing powers of lay justices were limited to a fine in excess of £2,500 or imprisonment of up to 60 days. In practice, most offences were dealt with by a fine.

=== Stipendary magistrates ===
In Glasgow, the volume of business required the employment of four solicitors as stipendiary magistrates who sit in place of the lay justices. The stipendiary magistrates' court remained under the new JP court system, and had the same sentencing power as the summary sheriff court. The office of stipendiary magistrate was abolished following the passage of the Courts Reform (Scotland) Act 2014, and replaced with the new office of summary sheriff.

== See also ==
- Magistrates' court (England and Wales)
