= Trial by jury in Scotland =

Trial by jury in Scotland is used in the courts of Scotland in solemn procedure for trial on indictment before a judge and jury for serious criminal cases, and in certain civil cases (mainly personal injury claims).

== Current system ==
Criminal procedure in Scotland is generally regulated by the Criminal Procedure (Scotland) Act 1995 (as amended by various acts including the Courts Reform (Scotland) Act 2014) and various Acts of Adjournal passed by the High Court of Justiciary, with some significant amendments by the Victims, Witnesses, and Justice Reform (Scotland) Act 2025 (2025 asp 12 Section 27). Juries in these cases consist of 15 people; if jurors drop out, for example because of illness or death, the trial can continue with a minimum of 12 jurors (2025 asp 12 Section 62).

The jury has a choice of two verdicts: guilty or not guilty. A guilty verdict requires a two-thirds majority, that is a minimum of ten jurors with a full jury, and two thirds of the remaining jurors if any jurors drop out. Failure to reach the majority for a guilty verdict is treated as a verdict of not guilty, so it is not possible to have a hung jury.

In civil trials there is a jury of 12 people, and it is possible to have a hung jury.

The pool of potential jurors is purely at random, and Scottish courts have set themselves against any form of jury vetting.

== History ==
During World War II the Administration of Justice (Emergency Provisions) (Scotland) Act 1939 provided that both civil and criminal juries would have seven members, of whom two would be special members, except for trials for treason or murder, or where a case in the High Court of Justiciary required the regular jury of fifteen on the "gravity of matters in issue".

Before 2026 there was the not proven verdict, and verdicts in criminal trials could be reached by simple majority. The not proven verdict was abolished by the Victims, Witnesses, and Justice Reform (Scotland) Act 2025. (2025 asp 12 Section 65)

== Eligibility ==
The rules of eligibility for jury service are broadly similar to England, but people with legal experience (such as solicitors, advocates, or court clerks) are excluded, as are those who have been involved in the justice system, including, but not limited to, police officers (serving and retired), medical forensic practitioners and coroners, and prison officers.

Those who meet all of the following criteria are eligible for jury service:

- British, Irish, Commonwealth and European Union citizens on the Electoral Register;
- aged 18 or over;
- ordinarily resident in the UK, Channel Islands or the Isle of Man for any period of at least 5 years since the age of 13; and
- not disqualified for whatever reason.

Disqualified persons include:

- members of the judiciary, including sheriffs and JPs;
- court staff;
- lawyers and their clerks and trainees;
- police, including anyone with police powers, and inspectors of constabulary;
- prison officers;
- procurators fiscal;
- members of the Parole Board for Scotland;
- members and employees of the Scottish Police Services Authority;
- anyone who has been one of these things in the last 5 years;
- members and employees of the Scottish Criminal Case Review Commission;
- chief officers of community justice authorities;
- people detained in hospital or subject to guardianship for mental health reasons.
