= County Buildings, Airdrie =

Judicial building in Airdrie, Scotland

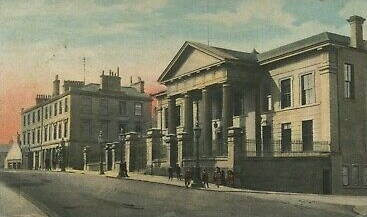
- The building in the early 20th century

- Shown in North Lanarkshire
- 55.8667°N 3.9812°W
- Location: Bank Street, Airdrie

History
- Built: 1858
- Demolished: 1969

Site notes
- Architect: James Thomson
- Architectural style: Neoclassical style

County Buildings was a judicial building on Bank Street in Airdrie in Scotland. The building, which was the venue for hearings of the Airdrie Sheriff Court, was demolished in 1969.

== History ==
The first judicial building in the town was the Airdrie Town House on the east side of Bank Street which incorporated a courtroom and a police station and was completed in 1810. In the mid-19th century, court officials decided to commission a purpose-built courthouse. The site they selected was on the west side of Bank Street, facing the town hall.

The foundation stone for the new building was laid on 31 July 1856. It was designed by James Thomson in the neoclassical style, built in ashlar stone and was completed in around 1858. The design involved a symmetrical main frontage of nine bays facing onto Bank Street. The central section of three bays featured a two-storey tetrastyle portico formed by four Doric order columns supporting an entablature with triglyphs and a modillioned pediment. The wings of three bays each were rusticated on the ground floor and fenestrated by sash windows on both floors. Internally, the principal room was the main courtroom, which accommodated hearings of the Airdrie Sheriff Court, the small debt court, the ordinary and debts recovery courts, the justice of the peace court, and the burgh court.

As well as being used as a courthouse, the building also hosted public events: a regimental banquet of the 7th Lanarkshire Rifle Volunteer Corps was held there in 1865.

In 1962, a building inspection revealed that County Buildings was structurally unsound, and, in the mid-1960s, hearings of Airdrie Sheriff Court were relocated to a temporary facility in Coatbridge. County Buildings was demolished in 1969 and replaced by a row of shops. In the early 1970s, a modern courthouse was erected in Graham Street to accommodate hearings of the Airdrie Sheriff Court, and, in June 2019, the justice of the peace court relocated to a site just opposite the new courthouse in Graham Street.
