= Education and Justice Directorates =

The Education and Justice Directorates are a group of directorates of the Scottish Government. The Director General for Education and Justice is Neil Rennick, who was appointed to the role in September 2023. He has direct responsibility for education in Scotland, as well as for life-long learning. Additionally, the directorate holds responsibility for safety and the justice system. The Director-General Education and Justice is a member of the Scottish Government's Corporate Governance Board. The individual directorates report to the Director-General.

== History ==
The directorates were created by a re-organisation in 2011. The directorates were preceded by similar structures called "Departments" that no longer exist (although the word is still sometimes used in this context). As an overarching family of Directorates, the Learning and Justice Directorates incorporate the following individual Directorates:

== Current Directorates ==
The Education and Justice Directorates currently consist of the following directorates:

- Children and Families Directorate
- Early Learning and Childcare Directorate
- Education Reform Directorate
- Justice Directorate
- Learning Directorate
- Lifelong Learning and Skills Directorate
- Safer Communities Directorate

== Agencies and other bodies ==
The directorates are responsible for various non-departmental public bodies.

- Disclosure Scotland
- Education Scotland
- Registers of Scotland
- Scottish Courts and Tribunals Service
- Scottish Prison Service
- Scottish Housing Regulator
- Student Awards Agency for Scotland

== See also ==
- Scots law
- Education in Scotland
  - Education Scotland
  - Care Inspectorate
