= Solemn proceedings =

Solemn proceedings is the term used in Scotland for serious criminal cases prosecuted on indictment before a judge and jury. These are distinct from summary proceedings before a sheriff or justice of the peace sitting without a jury.

== See also ==
- Indictable offence
- Trial by jury in Scotland
