= Inverness Justice Centre =

Municipal building in Inverness, Scotland

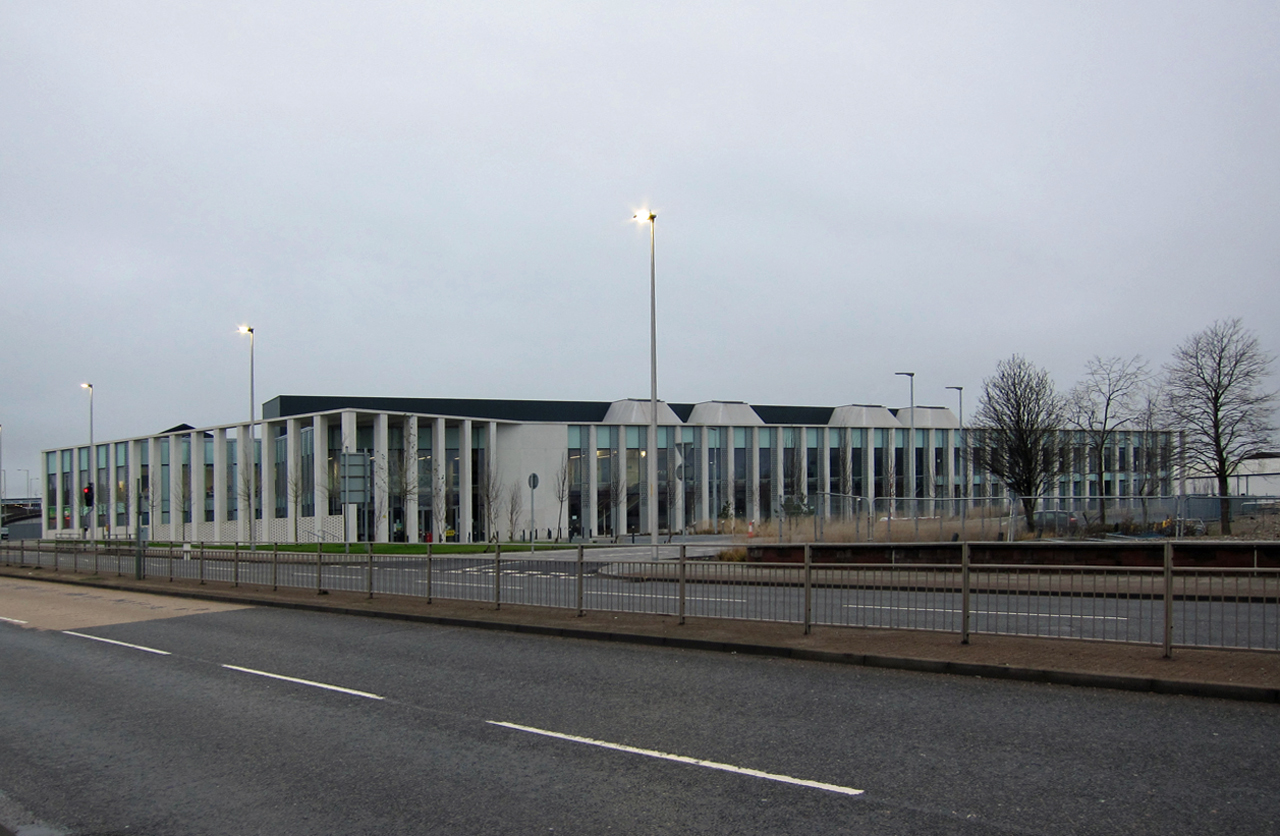
- Inverness Justice Centre

- Shown in Inverness-shire
- 57.4844°N 4.2231°W
- Location: Longman Road, Inverness

History
- Built: 2020

Site notes
- Architect(s): Reiach and Hall Architects
- Architectural style: Moderist style

Inverness Justice Centre is a sheriff court and justice of the peace court venue in Longman Road, Inverness, Scotland. It also includes the offices of the procurator fiscal.

== History ==
Until 2020, all sheriff court hearings took place at Inverness Castle. However, as the number of court cases in Inverness grew, it became necessary to commission a modern courthouse for criminal matters. The site selected by the Scottish Courts and Tribunals Service had previously been occupied by a bus depot on Longman Road, which had once been fronted by a row of terraced houses.

The new building was designed by Reiach and Hall Architects in the Modernist style, built by Robertson Group with support from Willmott Dixon in concrete and glass at a cost of £24 million and was officially opened on 30 March 2020.

The design involved an asymmetrical main frontage facing north towards Harbour Road. The frontage was formed by a long colonnade of square columns supporting a concrete frame. In the left hand section of five bays, the columns were canted forward from the longer right hand section of 30 bays, so creating a sheltered area for access to the building. Behind the columns the building was clad in sheet glass. Internally, the building was laid out to accommodate six courtrooms. The building was named Public Building of the Year in the Scottish Design Awards for 2021, and was awarded the Architectural Excellence Award (Public) in the Scottish Property Awards for 2021.

Notable court cases have included the trial and conviction of William MacDowell, in September 2022, for the murder of his lover, Renee MacRae, and their son, Andrew MacRae, in 1976: the case was heard by the High Court of Justiciary sitting in the Inverness Justice Centre.
