= Peterhead Sheriff Court =

Judicial building in Peterhead, Scotland

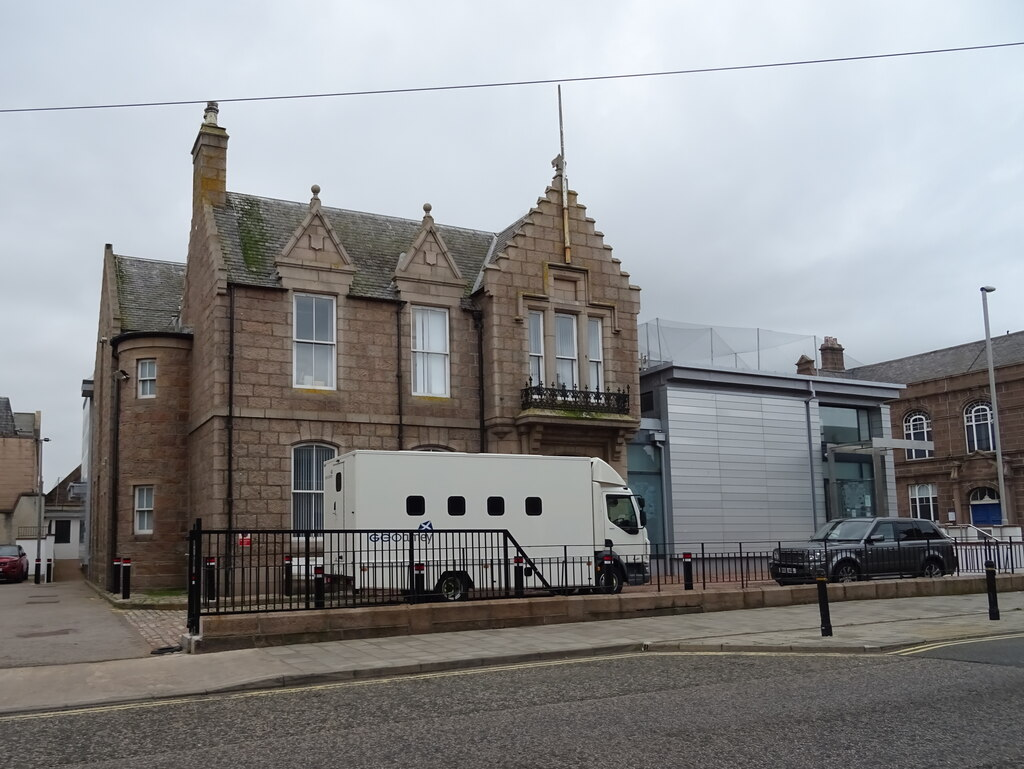
- The building in 2020

- Shown in Aberdeenshire
- 57.5068°N 1.7810°W
- Location: Queen Street, Peterhead

History
- Built: 1871

Site notes
- Architect: William Smith
- Architectural style: Scottish baronial style

Peterhead Sheriff Court is a judicial building in Queen Street in Peterhead in Scotland. The building was expanded with a large extension in the late 1990s and continues to be used as a courthouse.

== History ==
A sheriff-substitute, who was resident in Peterhead, was first appointed in 1841. In the 1860s, court officials decided to commission a dedicated courthouse for the town. The site they selected was on the southwest side of Queen Street. The foundation stone for the new building was laid with full masonic honours on 16 August 1869. It was designed by William Smith in the Scottish baronial style, built in ashlar stone at a cost of £2,600 and was completed in 1871.

The design involved an asymmetrical main frontage of three bays facing onto Queen Street. The first two bays were fenestrated by segmental headed windows with voussoirs on the ground floor, and by sash windows with tall pediments surmounted by finials on the first floor. The right-hand bay, which was slightly projected forward, featured a segmental headed doorway flanked by pilasters and brackets supporting a balcony with ornate railings: there was a tripartite window with a panel in the hood mould on the first floor, and a stepped gable above. Internally, the principal rooms included the two courtrooms and three prison cells.

A large extension, designed by the Property Services Agency in the modern style, was built on the northwest side of the building, along St Peter Street, and was completed in the late 1990s. The design involved a cladding system using granite panels from Blackhill Quarry. However, after being exposed to sustained adverse weather in a location close to the North Sea, the cladding system started to deteriorate. An extensive programme of refurbishment works, involving the replacement of the granite cladding with new aluminium cladding, was completed by Clark Contracts at a cost of £1.5 million to a design by Michael Laurie Architects in 2019. This enabled the building to continue to serve as the venue for sheriff court hearings in the area.
