= Judiciary and Courts (Scotland) Act 2008 =

Act of the Scottish Parliament

Judiciary and Courts (Scotland) Act 2008 (Note: Section 76(2).)
- Act of the Scottish Parliament
- Scottish Parliament
- Long title: An Act of the Scottish Parliament to make provision about the judiciary and the courts; to establish the Scottish Court Service; and for connected purposes.
- Citation: 2008 asp 6
- Introduced by: Kenny MacAskill
- Territorial extent: Scotland

Dates
- Royal assent: 29 October 2008
- Repealed: various (Note: Section 76(1).)

Other legislation
- Amends: Promissory Oaths Act 1868; Administration of Justice (Scotland) Act 1933; Law Reform (Miscellaneous Provisions) (Scotland) Act 1985; Court of Session Act 1988; Law Reform (Miscellaneous Provisions) (Scotland) Act 1990; Criminal Procedure (Scotland) Act 1995; Scottish Public Services Ombudsman Act 2002
- Amended by: Scottish Civil Justice Council and Criminal Legal Assistance Act 2013; Tribunals (Scotland) Act 2014; Courts Reform (Scotland) Act 2014; Management of Offenders (Scotland) Act 2019; Scottish Courts and Tribunals Service (Judicial Members) Amendment Order 2020; Public Service Pensions and Judicial Offices Act 2022; Judicial Appointments Board for Scotland (Membership) Modification Order 2022

Status: Amended

History of passage through the Parliament

Text of statute as originally enacted

Revised text of statute as amended

Text of the Judiciary and Courts (Scotland) Act 2008 as in force today (including any amendments) within the United Kingdom, from legislation.gov.uk.

The Judiciary and Courts (Scotland) Act 2008 (asp 6) is an act of the Scottish Parliament passed in October 2008 to reform the courts of Scotland, to give statutory force to judicial independence, and to establish the Lord President of the Court of Session as Head of the Judiciary of Scotland.

== Provisions ==
=== Scottish Court Service ===
The act established the Scottish Court Service, bringing together all the courts from the appeal court to the lowest district court.

=== Head of the judiciary ===
The responsibility for the administration of the court service was transferred to the Lord President by the act. The act enshrined the Lord President as the head of the judiciary.

=== Judicial independence ===
Judicial independence is enshrined by section 1 of the act, which stipulates specific duties to uphold judicial independence on

- The First Minister of Scotland
- The Lord Advocate
- The Scottish Ministers
- Members of the Scottish Parliament
- and others "with responsibility for matters relating to the judiciary or the administration of justice" in Scotland

All of those specified are barred from using any form of special access to influence the judgments or decisions made by the judiciary of Scotland.
