= Paisley Sheriff Court =

Courthouse in Paisley, Scotland

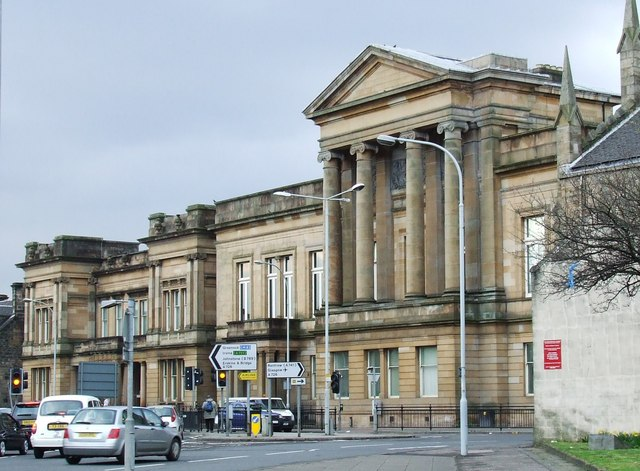
- The 1885 building on the far left and the 1890 extension on the right

- Shown in Renfrewshire
- 55.8486°N 4.4269°W
- Location: St James Street, Paisley

History
- Built: 1885

Site notes
- Architect(s): William Clarke and George Bell
- Architectural style: Neoclassical style

Listed Building – Category A
- Official name: Paisley Sheriff Court and Justice of the Peace Court, excluding 3-storey extension to north, St James Street, Paisley
- Designated: 26 February 1971
- Reference no.: LB39103

Paisley Sheriff Court is a municipal structure in St James Street, Paisley, Renfrewshire, Scotland. The complex, which was the headquarters of Renfrewshire County Council and is currently used as a courthouse, is a Category A listed building.

== History ==
Court hearings were originally held in the tolbooth in Hairst Street in Renfrew but were transferred to the tolbooth at the junction of High Street and Moss Street in Paisley in the mid-16th century. The tolbooth, which was rebuilt in 1757 and then demolished in 1821, was replaced by the old County Buildings on the east side of County Square. This was a castellated building, built at a cost of £28,000, which was completed in 1820. By the 1880s the building in County Square was deemed too small and it was decided to erect a new courthouse on the north side of St James Street.

The new building was designed by William Clarke and George Bell in the neoclassical style, built in ashlar stone and was completed in 1885. The design involved a symmetrical main frontage of seven bays facing onto St James Street with the end bays projected forward. The central section of five bays featured a portico which formed the centrepiece of a colonnade with Doric order columns supporting an entablature and a balustrade. On the first floor, the central section was fenestrated by a double sash window flanked by single sash windows. The outer bays were fenestrated by tripartite widows on both floors with the first floor windows flanked by pairs of Ionic order pilasters. All the windows on the first floor were surmounted by cornices supported by brackets. At roof level, there was an entablature, a cornice, a parapet and a series of urns. Internally, the principal room was the courtroom at the rear of the building.

Following the implementation of the Local Government (Scotland) Act 1889, which established county councils in every county, the new county leaders needed to identify offices for Renfrewshire County Council. The complex was therefore extended to the east by a new seven bay extension designed by George Bell, built in ashlar stone and completed in 1890. The extension became known as "County Buildings". The left-hand section of three bays featured a porch formed by Doric order columns supporting an entablature and a parapet. The right-hand section of four bays featured, in the first three bays, a full-height portico with first-floor Ionic columns supporting a pediment. At the back of the portico was a carved frieze sculpted by F. W. Pomeroy and depicting Greek mythological figures. The extension contained a council chamber for the new county council as well as officers for the council officers.

In 1971 Renfrewshire County Council moved to new offices at the County and Municipal Buildings on Cotton Street, which was a joint facility built for the County Council, Paisley Town Council and the local police. The St James Street building was then used solely for judicial purposes: it continued to be used for hearings of the sheriff court.

In January 1996, the court was the venue for the fatal accident investigation into the Mull of Kintyre Chinook crash in 1994 when all twenty-five passengers, including almost all the United Kingdom's senior Northern Ireland intelligence experts, as well as four crew on board were killed. In 2013, the exterior court scenes for the TV drama series, The Escape Artist, were filmed outside the building.

Since 2011, on one day a month, the building has also been used as the venue for hearings of the justice of the peace court.

== See also ==
- List of Category A listed buildings in Renfrewshire
- List of listed buildings in Paisley, Renfrewshire
