= History of Scots law =

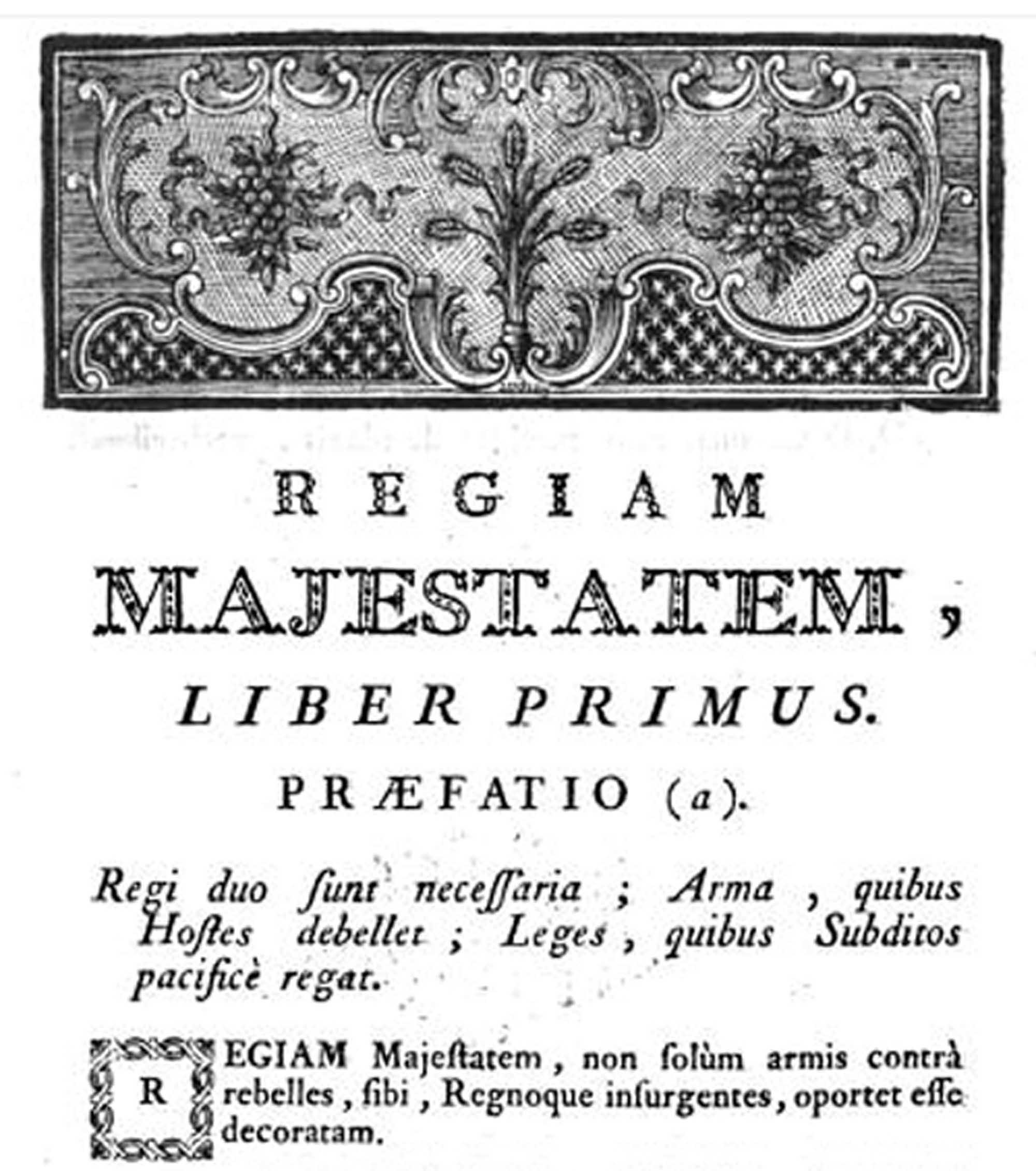
The Regiam Majestatem is the oldest surviving written digest of Scots law.

The history of Scots law traces the development of Scots law from its early beginnings as a number of different custom systems among Scotland's early cultures to its modern role as one of the three legal jurisdictions of the United Kingdom. The various historic sources of Scots law, including custom, feudal law, canon law, Roman law and English law have created a hybrid or mixed legal system, which shares elements with English law and Northern Irish law but also has its own unique legal institutions and sources.

== Origins ==
The nature of Scots law before the 12th century is largely speculative but most likely was a folk-right system applying a specific customary legal tradition to a certain culture inhabiting a certain corresponding area at the time, e.g. Brehon law for the Gaels (Scoti and men of Galloway and Ayrshire), Welsh law for lowland Britons of Yr Hen Ogledd, Udal law for the Norse of Caithness and the islands, and Anglo-Saxon law in Lothian and Borders. The earliest preserved Scottish law code is the Leges inter Brettos et Scottos, promulgated under David I (r. 1124 – 1153) and regulating Welsh and Gaelic custom. The Leges Quatuor Burgorum (‘Laws of the Four Burghs’) was promulgated sometime between 1135–57 and regulated Lothian law.

It is difficult to say with any certainty to what degree contemporary Scots law still incorporates these customary sources. There is evidence to suggest that as late as the 17th century marriage laws in the Highlands and Islands still reflected Gaelic custom, contrary to Catholic religious principles. The formation of the Kingdom of Scotland and its subjugation of the surrounding cultures, completed by the Battle of Carham, established what is approximately the boundaries of contemporary mainland Scotland. The Outer Hebrides were added after the Battle of Largs in 1263 and the Northern Isles were acquired in 1469, completing what is today the legal jurisdiction of Scotland.

== Feudalism ==
In the 12th century King David I began the gradual introduction of feudalism in Scotland and established feudal land tenure over many parts of the south and east, which eventually spread northward. As feudalism began to develop in Scotland a number of separate court systems developed.

Sheriffs were appointed by the King in the south and over time spread north. Their scope gradually developed and they were fully established across mainland Scotland by 1300. The sheriffs were originally appointed by the King as royal administrators and tax collectors but their powers grew and as early as 1214 they were holding court to hear a variety of cases. Feudal lords were also normally permitted to hold court where disputes between their tenants, including criminal matters, were adjudicated. By the 14th century some of these feudal courts had developed into "petty kingdoms" where the King's courts did not have authority, except for cases of treason. Burghs, towns which had been given this special status usually by the King, also had their own set of local laws dealing mostly with commercial and trade matters. The burghs themselves established their own separate court system by authority of the King to administer and enforce these laws. The burgh laws were collected as the Leges burgorum by 1270, though the laws applied by the burgh courts and the sheriff courts were similar. Ecclesiastical courts also played an important role in Scotland as they had exclusive jurisdiction over matters such as marriage, contracts made on oath, inheritance and legitimacy. These courts, unlike their lay counterparts, were generally staffed by educated men who were trained in both Roman and Canon law and offered a more sophisticated form of justice. Litigants seem to have preferred to bring disputes before the ecclesiastical courts or an ecclesiastical arbiter rather than the lay courts in Scotland.

== Wars of Independence ==
During the period of English control over Scotland there is some evidence to suggest that King Edward I attempted to abolish Scottish laws that were contrary to English law, as he had done in Wales. King Edward I also reformed the legal institutions of Scotland during this period with the organisation of a Scottish government in September 1305. He also sent out pairs of justices, one Englishman and one Scotsman, to oversee different regions in Scotland.

During the Wars of Scottish Independence legal developments in Scotland appeared to have slowed, likely affected by the widespread social turmoil. There is some evidence that there were attempts to codify the law of the time and a small number of reforming statutes were passed by the Parliament of Scotland evidencing at least some concern for remedying deficiencies in the law. Under Robert the Bruce the importance of the Parliament of Scotland grew as he called them more frequently and its composition shifted to include more representation from the burghs and lesser landowners. In 1399, a General Council established that the King should hold a parliament at least once a year for the next three years so, "that his subjects are served by the law". In 1318, a parliament at Scone enacted a code of law that drew upon older practices, but it was also dominated by current events and focused on military matters and the conduct of the war. Nevertheless, the Act also codified procedures for criminal trials and protections for vassals from ejection from the land.

Scotland's three oldest universities, the University of St Andrews, the University of Glasgow and the University of Aberdeen were also founded following the wars and the Education Act 1496 was passed requiring those who administered justice in Scotland to learn Latin and study law for at least 3 years at school.

From the 14th century we have surviving examples of early Scottish legal literature, such as the Regiam Majestatem (on procedure at the royal courts) and the Quoniam Attachiamenta (on procedure at the baron courts). Both of these important texts, as they were copied, had provisions from Roman law and the ius commune inserted or developed, demonstrating the influence which both these sources had on Scots law.

== Stewart dynasty ==
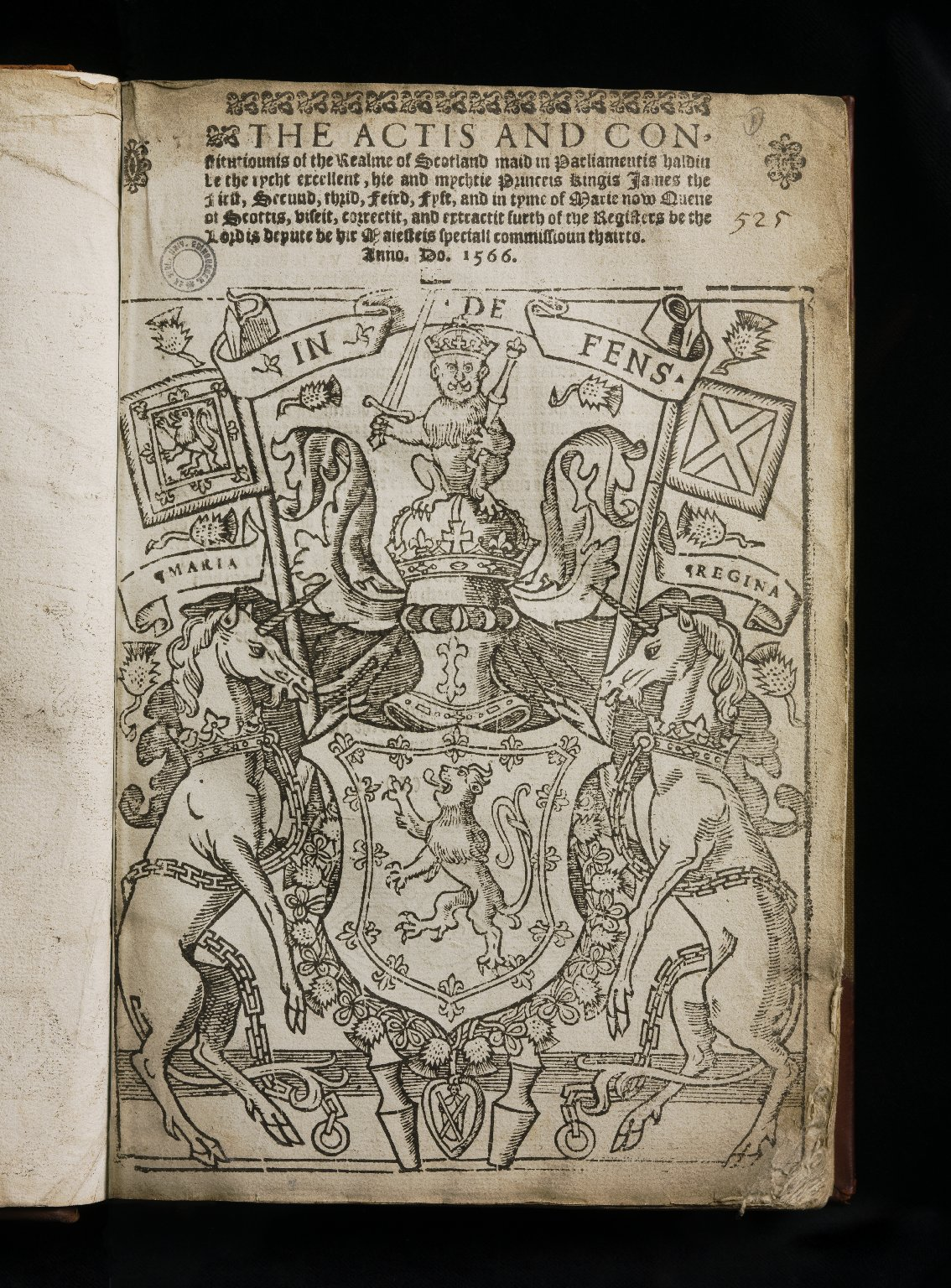
1566 book, The Actis and Constitutiounis of the Realme of Scotland

The Stewart dynasty, founded by King Robert II in 1371, was defined by the growing authority and power of the Scottish Kings and development of existing legal institutions. In 1469, the Parliament of Scotland affirmed the ultimate authority of King James III and rejected the authority of imperial notaries in Scottish civil matters. The recognition of the sovereign authority of the Scottish Kings was connected to the influence of the ius commune in Scots law. For example, the Pragmatic Sanction of Bourges of 1438 was an attempt to limit papal authority in France and recognise the sovereign authority of King Charles VII of France. Various customary laws, such as the Law of Clan MacDuff, came under attack from the Stewart Dynasty which consequently extended the reach of Scots common law.

From the reign of King James I to King James V the beginnings of a legal profession began to develop and the administration of criminal and civil justice was centralised. The Parliament of Scotland was normally called on an annual basis during this period, with the notable exception of King James IV, and its membership was further defined. The number of burghs also continued to expand, including the introduction of burghs of barony, and their authority remained largely undisturbed. The evolution of the modern Court of Session also traces its history to the 15th and early 16th century with the establishment of a specialised group of councillors to the King evolving from the King's Council who dealt solely with the administration of justice. In 1528, it was established that the Lords of Council not appointed to this body were to be excluded from its audiences and it was also this body that four years later in 1532 became the College of Justice.

The growing activity of the parliament and the centralisation of administration in Scotland called for the better dissemination of Acts of the parliament to the courts and other enforcers of the law. There was still a great reliance on the old laws, codified in the Regiam Majestatem and Quoniam Attachiamenta among others, which persisted. Throughout the late 15th century various unsuccessful attempts were made to form commissions of experts to codify, update or define Scots law. The legal uncertainty which this situation created prompted increased reliance on the ius commune found in Canon law and there are a number of examples of statutes from this period which clearly drew from Roman law.

Men educated in the law also became increasingly important alongside the early development of the College of Justice and ecclesiastical courts, filling the need for experts in advocacy, pleading and court procedure. The study of law was popular in Scotland and many students travelled to Continental Europe to study canon law and civil law. In 1532, when the College of Justice established rules of practice and a closed list of ten lawyers permitted to appear before them, six had studied law abroad. This also expanded the influence of Roman law and the ius commune on the Scottish common law. The general practice during this period, as evidenced from records of cases, seems to have been to defer to specific Scottish laws on a matter when available and to fill in any gaps with provisions from the ius commune embodied in civil and canon law, which had the advantage of being written.

== Great Britain ==
The Act of Union 1707 unified the Kingdom of Scotland and the Kingdom of England to form Great Britain. Article 19 of the Act confirmed the continuing authority of the College of Justice, Court of Session and Court of Justiciary in Scotland. Article 3, however, merged the Parliament of Scotland with the Parliament of England to form the Parliament of Great Britain, with its seat in the Palace of Westminster, London.

The Parliament of Great Britain was now unrestricted in altering laws concerning public right, policy and civil government, but concerning private right, only alterations for the evident utility of the subjects within Scotland were permitted. The Scottish Enlightenment then reinvigorated Scots law as a university-taught discipline. The transfer of legislative power to London and the introduction of appeal to the House of Lords (now to the Supreme Court of the United Kingdom) brought further English influence. In the nineteenth century new areas of public policy that had not been part of Scottish law, in areas such as public health, working conditions, the protection of investors, were legislated for by the British Parliament, challenging the uniqueness of the system. Acts of the Parliament began to create unified legal statutes applying in both England and Scotland, particularly when conformity was seen as necessary for pragmatic reasons (such as the Sale of Goods Act 1893). Appeal decisions by English judges raised concerns about this appeal to a foreign system, and in the late 19th century Acts allowed for the appointment of Scottish Lords of Appeal in Ordinary. At the same time, a series of cases made it clear that no appeal lay from the High Court of Justiciary to the House of Lords.

Today the Supreme Court of the United Kingdom usually has a minimum of two Scottish justices to ensure that some Scottish experience is brought to bear on Scottish appeals. Scots law has continued to change and develop, with the most significant change coming under devolution and the formation of the Scottish Parliament in 1999.
