= Scots law =

Legal system of Scotland

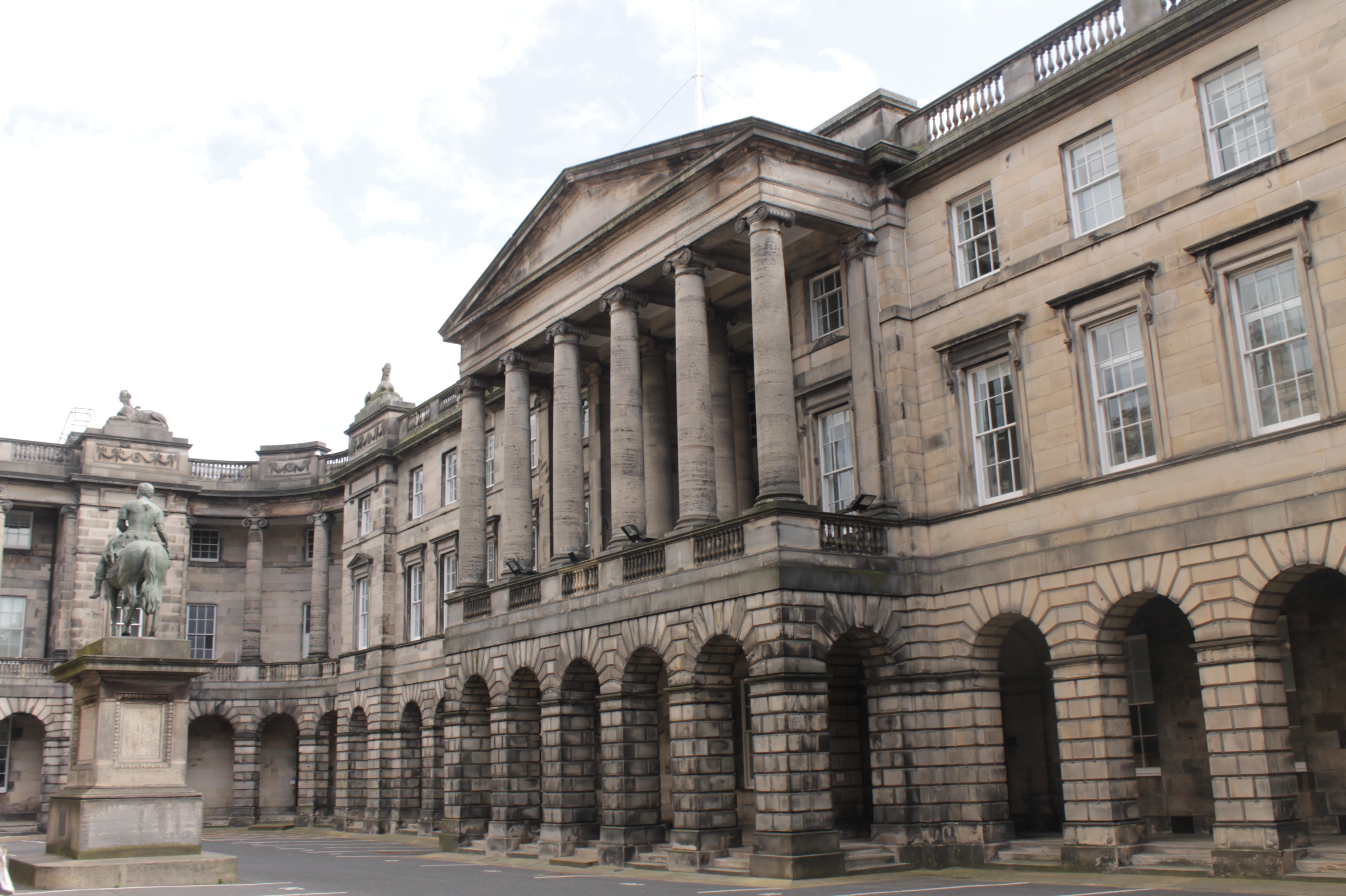
Parliament House in Old Town, Edinburgh, is home to the Supreme Courts of Scotland.

Scots law (Scottish Gaelic: Lagh na h-Alba) is the legal system of Scotland. It is a hybrid or mixed legal system containing civil law and common law elements, that traces its roots to a number of different historical sources. Together with English law and Northern Irish law, it is one of the three legal systems of the United Kingdom. Scots law recognises four sources of law: legislation, legal precedent, specific academic writings, and custom. The majority of legislation affecting Scotland and Scots law is primarily passed by the Scottish Parliament, who legislate on all areas of devolved responsibility, whilst the Parliament of the United Kingdom legislates only on reserved matters. Some legislation passed by the Parliament of Scotland regarding the Kingdom of Scotland is still also valid.

Early Scots law before the 12th century consisted of the different legal traditions of the various cultural groups who inhabited the country at the time, the Gaels in most of the country, with the Britons and Anglo-Saxons in some districts south of the Forth and with the Norse in the islands and north of the River Oykel. The introduction of feudalism from the 12th century and the expansion of the Kingdom of Scotland established the modern roots of Scots law, which was gradually influenced by other, especially Anglo-Norman and continental legal traditions. Although there was some indirect Roman law influence on Scots law, the direct influence of Roman law was slight up until around the 15th century. After this time, Roman law was often adopted in argument in court, in an adapted form, where there was no native Scots rule to settle a dispute; and Roman law was in this way partially received into Scots law.

Since the Union with England Act 1707, Scotland has shared a legislature with England and Wales, but since the re–establishment of a Scottish Parliament in 1998, has greater autonomy over Scots law through its own government within areas of devolved matters. Scotland retained a fundamentally different legal system from that south of the border, but the Union exerted English influence upon Scots law. Since the UK joined the European Union, Scots law has also been affected by European Union law under the Treaties of the European Union, the requirements of the European Convention on Human Rights (entered into by members of the Council of Europe) and the creation of the devolved Scottish Parliament which may pass legislation within all areas not reserved to Westminster, as detailed by the Scotland Act 1998.

The UK Withdrawal from the European Union (Continuity) (Scotland) Act 2021 was passed by the Scottish Parliament in December 2020. It received royal assent on 29 January 2021 and came into operation on the same day. It provides powers for the Scottish Ministers to keep devolved Scots law in alignment with future EU law.

== Scotland as a distinct jurisdiction ==
The United Kingdom, judicially, consists of three jurisdictions: England and Wales, Scotland, and Northern Ireland. There are important differences among Scots law, English law and Northern Irish law in areas such as property law, criminal law, trust law, inheritance law, evidence law and family law while there are greater similarities in areas of UK-wide interest such as commercial law, consumer rights, taxation, employment law and health and safety regulations.

Examples of differences among the jurisdictions include the age of legal capacity (16 years old in Scotland but 18 years old in England and Wales), and the fact that equity was never a distinct branch of Scots law. Some examples in criminal law include:

- The use of 15-member juries for criminal trials in Scotland (compared with 12-member juries in England and Wales), where a two-thirds majority is required to convict.
- The accused in a criminal trial does not have the right to elect between a judge or jury trial.
- Historically, judges and juries of criminal trials had the "third verdict" of not proven available to them though this was abolished on 1 January 2026.
- The requirement for corroborating evidence means at least two independent sources of evidence are required in support of each crucial fact before an accused can be convicted.

In Scotland there are justice of the peace courts and sheriff courts, rather than magistrates' courts or Crown Court as in England and Wales. The High Court of Justiciary is Scotland’s supreme criminal court and deals with the most serious crime. The Court of Session is the supreme civil court. The majority of crime is prosecuted by The Crown Office and Procurator Fiscal Service, which provides the independent public prosecution service for Scotland similar to the Crown Prosecution Service in England and Wales and the Public Prosecution Service in Northern Ireland. The Crown Office and Procurator Fiscal Service is also the country’s death investigation service, and is responsible for investigating all suspicious, sudden or unexplained deaths.

Unlike England and Wales or Northern Ireland, Scotland has no coronial system to investigate deaths. Instead a fatal accident inquiry (FAI), presided over by a judge, may be established to determine the cause of a death and any steps to prevent deaths in similar circumstances. Except in circumstances where an FAI is mandatory, such as deaths in prison or in police custody, the Crown Office will determine whether an FAI would be in the public interest.

== Terminology ==
Under Scots law and in the Scottish courts, the person or body making a claim in a civil action is called a "pursuer" and the opposing party is called a "defender". An article produced and lodged as evidence in court is called a "production", whereas in England and Wales it would be referred to as an "exhibit".

== History ==
=== Origins ===
Scots law can be traced to its early beginnings as a number of different custom systems among Scotland's early cultures to its modern role as one of the three legal jurisdictions of the United Kingdom. The various historic sources of Scots law, including customary law, feudal law, canon law, civil ius commune and English law have created a hybrid or mixed legal system.

The nature of Scots law before the 12th century is largely speculative, but is likely to have been a mixture of different legal traditions representing the different cultures inhabiting the land at the time, including Gaelic, Welsh, Norse and Anglo-Saxon customs. There is evidence to suggest that as late as the 17th century marriage laws in the Highlands and Islands still reflected Gaelic custom, contrary to Catholic religious principles. The formation of the Kingdom of Scotland and its subjugation of the surrounding cultures, completed by the Battle of Carham, established what are approximately the boundaries of contemporary mainland Scotland. The Outer Hebrides were added after the Battle of Largs in 1263, and the Northern Isles were acquired in 1469, completing what is today the legal jurisdiction of Scotland.

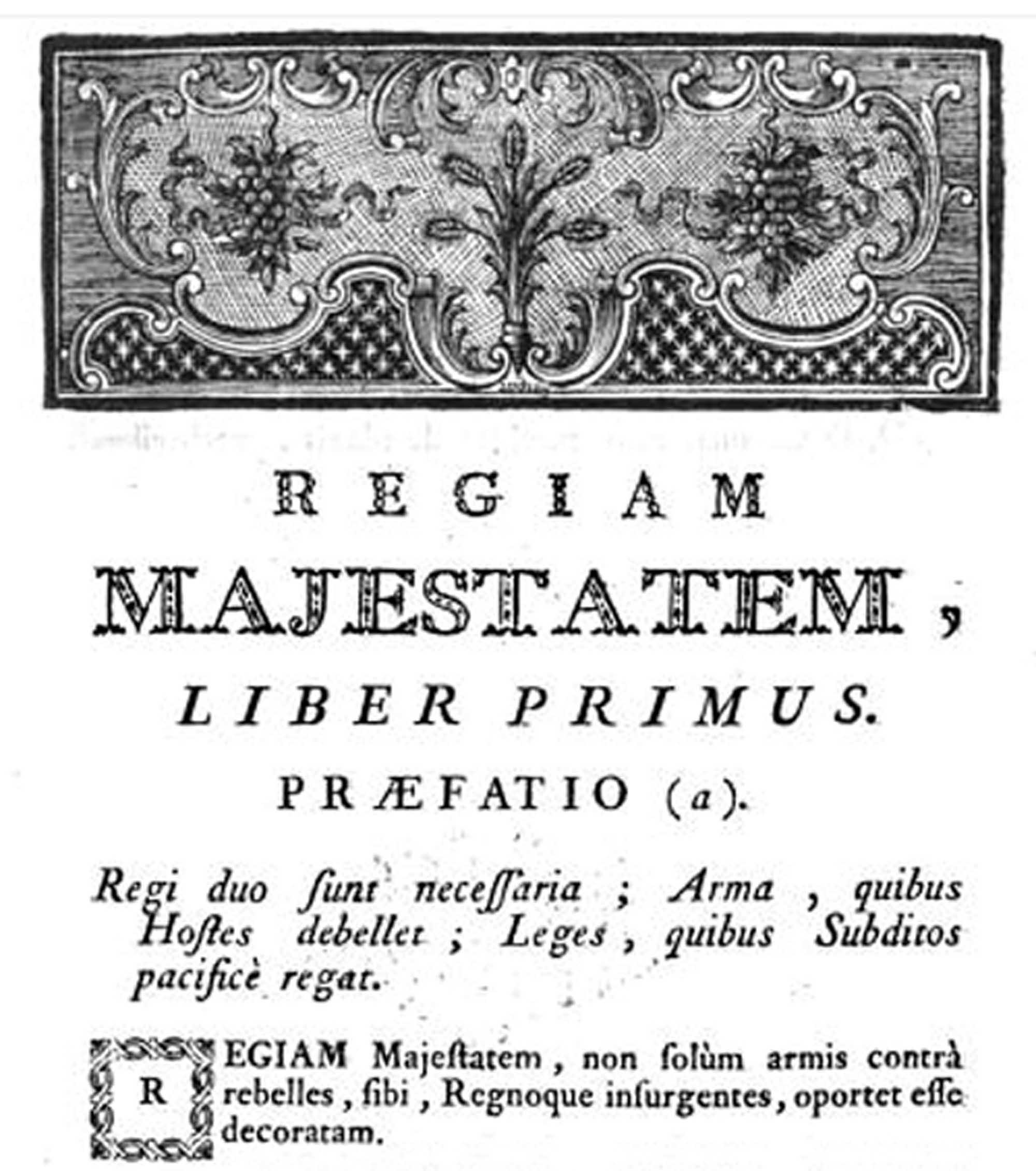
The Regiam Majestatem is the oldest surviving written digest of Scots law.

=== Feudalism ===
From the 12th century feudalism was gradually introduced to Scotland and established feudal land tenure over many parts of the south and east, which eventually spread northward. As feudalism began to develop in Scotland early court systems began to develop, including early forms of sheriff courts. Under Robert the Bruce the importance of the Parliament of Scotland grew as he called parliaments more frequently, and its composition shifted to include more representation from the burghs and lesser landowners. In 1399 a General Council established that the King should hold a parliament at least once a year for the next three years so "that his subjects are served by the law". In 1318 a parliament at Scone enacted a code of law that drew upon older practices, but it was also dominated by current events and focused on military matters and the conduct of the war of Scottish Independence.

From the 14th century there are surviving examples of early Scottish legal literature, such as the Regiam Majestatem (on procedure at the royal courts) and the Quoniam Attachiamenta (on procedure at the baron courts). Both of these important texts, as they were copied, had provisions from Roman law and the ius commune inserted or developed, demonstrating the influence which both these sources had on Scots law. From the reign of King James I to King James V the beginnings of a legal profession began to develop and the administration of criminal and civil justice was centralised. The Parliament of Scotland was normally called on an annual basis during this period and its membership was further defined. The evolution of the modern Court of Session also traces its history to the 15th and early 16th century with the establishment of a specialised group of councillors to the King evolving from the King's Council who dealt solely with the administration of justice. In 1528, it was established that the Lords of Council not appointed to this body were to be excluded from its audiences and it was also this body that four years later in 1532 became the College of Justice.

=== Parliamentary Sovereignty in Scotland ===
The 1688 Glorious Revolution and the Claim of Right in 1689 established parliamentary sovereignty in Scotland, and the Acts of Union 1707 merged the Kingdom of Scotland and the Kingdom of England to form the new Kingdom of Great Britain. Article 19 of the Treaty of Union confirmed the continuing authority of the College of Justice, Court of Session and Court of Justiciary in Scotland. Article 3, however, merged the Estates of Scotland with the Parliament of England to form the Parliament of Great Britain, with its seat in the Palace of Westminster, London. Under the terms of the Act of Union, Scotland retained its own systems of law, education and Church (Church of Scotland, Presbyterian polity), separately from the rest of the country.

The Parliament of Great Britain otherwise was not restricted in altering laws concerning public right, policy and civil government, but concerning private right, only alterations for the evident utility of the subjects within Scotland were permitted. The Scottish Enlightenment then reinvigorated Scots law as a university-taught discipline. The transfer of legislative power to London and the introduction of appeal in civil but not criminal cases to the House of Lords (since 2009, by appeal to the Supreme Court of the United Kingdom) brought further English influence. Acts of the Parliament began to create unified legal statutes applying in both England and Scotland, particularly when conformity was seen as necessary for pragmatic reasons (such as the Sale of Goods Act 1893). Appeal decisions by English judges raised concerns about this appeal to a foreign system, and in the late 19th century Acts allowed for the appointment of Scottish Lords of Appeal in Ordinary. At the same time, a series of cases made it clear that no appeal lay from the High Court of Justiciary to the House of Lords. Today the Supreme Court of the United Kingdom usually has a minimum of two Scottish justices to ensure that some Scottish experience is brought to bear on Scottish appeals.

=== Scottish devolution ===
Scots law has continued to change and develop in the 20th century, with the most significant change coming under devolution and the reformation of the Scottish Parliament. As a result of devolution, the Scottish Government regained control over many aspects of Scots law, marking the first time since 1707 that laws affecting Scotland were made directly by a Scottish Government. In 1885, a form of devolution was granted to Scotland through the creation of the Scotland Office which was primarily based in London, but also had facilities in Scotland's capital Edinburgh. The Scotland Office was headed by the Secretary of State for Scotland who had autonomy over specifically Scottish affairs, including Scots law. As a result of devolution, the majority of the Secretary of State for Scotland's responsibilities were transferred to the First Minister of Scotland, with the Secretary of State's influence over Scots law being over reserved matters only, and they prevent Royal Assent being granted for a piece of legislation proposed by the Scottish Parliament if it falls within reserved matters.

The Scottish Government and the Scottish Parliament legislates in all areas of devolved responsibility, with the Lord Advocate serving as the chief legal adviser to the Scottish Government over matters of Scots law and legislation. The Cabinet Secretary for Justice is the minister with the Scottish cabinet who is responsible for legal aspects in Scotland on matters devolved to the Scottish Parliament, as well as responsible for the country's justice system, criminal law procedure, courts, sentencing and Police Scotland.

=== Influential sources ===
An early Scottish legal compilation, Regiam Majestatem, was based heavily on Glanvill's English law treatise, although it also contains elements of civil law, feudal law, canon law, customary law and native Scots statutes. Although there was some indirect Roman-law influence on Scots law, via medieval ius commune and canon law used in the ecclesiastical courts, the direct influence of Roman law was slight up until around the mid-15th century. After this time, civil ius commune was often adopted in argument in court, in an adapted form, where there was no native Scots rule to settle a dispute; and civil law was in this way partially received in subsidium into Scots law.

Since the Acts of Union 1707, Scotland has shared a legislature with the rest of the United Kingdom. Scotland retained a fundamentally different legal system from that of England and Wales, but the Union brought English influence on Scots law. In recent years, Scots law has also been affected by European law under the Treaties of the European Union, the requirements of the European Convention on Human Rights (entered into by members of the Council of Europe) and the establishment of the Scottish Parliament which may pass legislation within its areas of legislative competence as detailed by the Scotland Act 1998.

== Sources ==
=== Legislation ===
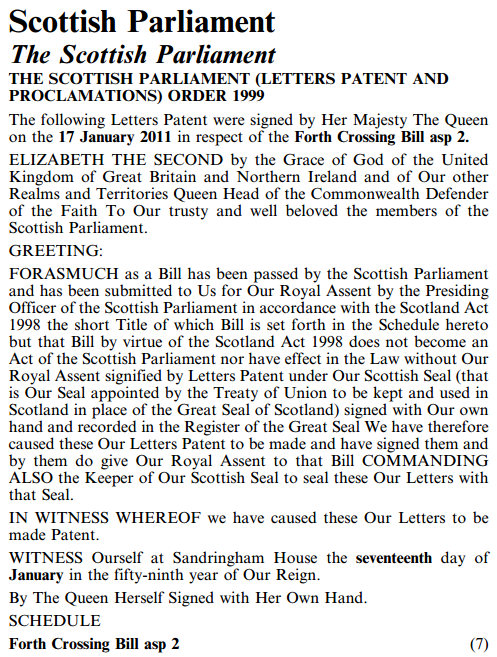
The text of the Letters Patent granting royal assent for the Forth Crossing Act 2011, as it appeared in the Edinburgh Gazette.

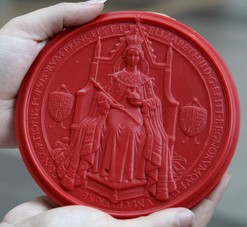
The Great Seal of Scotland in red beeswax. An impression like this is attached to all Letters Patent giving royal assent.

The Parliament of the United Kingdom has the power to pass statutes on any issue for Scotland, although under the Sewel convention it will not do so in devolved matters without the Scottish Parliament's consent. The Human Rights Act 1998, the Scotland Act 1998 and the European Communities Act 1972 have special status in the law of Scotland. Modern statutes will specify that they apply to Scotland and may also include special wording to take into consideration unique elements of the legal system. Statutes must receive royal assent from the King before becoming law, however this is now only a formal procedure and is automatic. Legislation of the Parliament of the United Kingdom is not subject to revocation by the courts as the Parliament is said to have supreme legal authority; however, application of legislation is subject to judicial review and also in practice, the Parliament will tend not to create legislation which contradicts the Human Rights Act 1998 or European law, although it is technically free to do so. The degree to which the Parliament has surrendered this sovereignty is a matter of controversy with arguments generally concerning what the relationship should be between the United Kingdom and the European Union. Acts of the United Kingdom Parliament also regularly delegate powers to Ministers of the Crown or other bodies to produce legislation in the form of statutory instruments. This delegated legislation has legal effect in Scotland so far as the specific provisions of the statutory instrument are duly authorised by the powers of the Act, a question which can be subjected to judicial review.

The Scottish Parliament is a devolved unicameral legislature that has the power to pass statutes only affecting Scotland on matters within its legislative competence. Legislation passed by the Scottish Parliament must also comply with the Human Rights Act 1998 and European law, otherwise the Court of Session or High Court of Justiciary have the authority to strike down the legislation as ultra vires. There have been a number of high-profile examples of challenges to Scottish Parliament legislation on these grounds, including against the Protection of Wild Mammals (Scotland) Act 2002 where an interest group unsuccessfully claimed the ban on fox hunting violated their human rights. Legislation passed by the Scottish Parliament also requires royal assent which, like with the Parliament of the United Kingdom, is automatically granted.

Legislation passed by the pre-1707 Parliament of Scotland still has legal effect in Scotland, though the number of statutes that have not been repealed is limited. Examples include the Royal Mines Act 1424, which makes gold and silver mines the property of the King, and the Leases Act 1449, which is still relied on today in property law cases.

Legislation which forms part of the law of Scotland should not be confused with a civil code as it does not attempt to comprehensively detail the law. Legislation forms only one of a number of sources.

=== Common law ===
Common law is an important legal source in Scotland, especially in criminal law where a large body of legal precedent has been developed, so that many crimes, such as murder, are not codified. Sources of common law in Scotland are the decisions of the Scottish courts and certain rulings of the Supreme Court of the United Kingdom (including its predecessor the Appellate Committee of the House of Lords). The degree to which decisions of the Supreme Court are binding on Scottish courts in civil matters is controversial, especially where those decisions relate to cases brought from other legal jurisdictions; however, decisions of the Supreme Court in appeals from Scotland are considered binding precedent. In criminal cases the highest appellate court is the Court of Justiciary and so the common law related to criminal law in Scotland has been largely developed only in Scotland. Rulings of the European Court of Human Rights and the Court of Justice of the European Union also contribute to the common law in the interpretation of the European Convention on Human Rights and European law respectively.

The common law of Scotland should not be confused with the common law of England, which has different historical roots. The historical roots of the common law of Scotland are the customary laws of the different cultures which inhabited the region, which were mixed together with feudal concepts by the Scottish Kings to form a distinct common law.

The influence that English-trained judges have had on the common law of Scotland through rulings of the Supreme Court of the United Kingdom (and formerly the Appellate Committee of the House of Lords) has been at times considerable, especially in areas of law where conformity was required across the United Kingdom for pragmatic reasons. This has resulted in rulings with strained interpretations of the common law of Scotland, such as Smith v Bank of Scotland.

=== Institutional writers ===
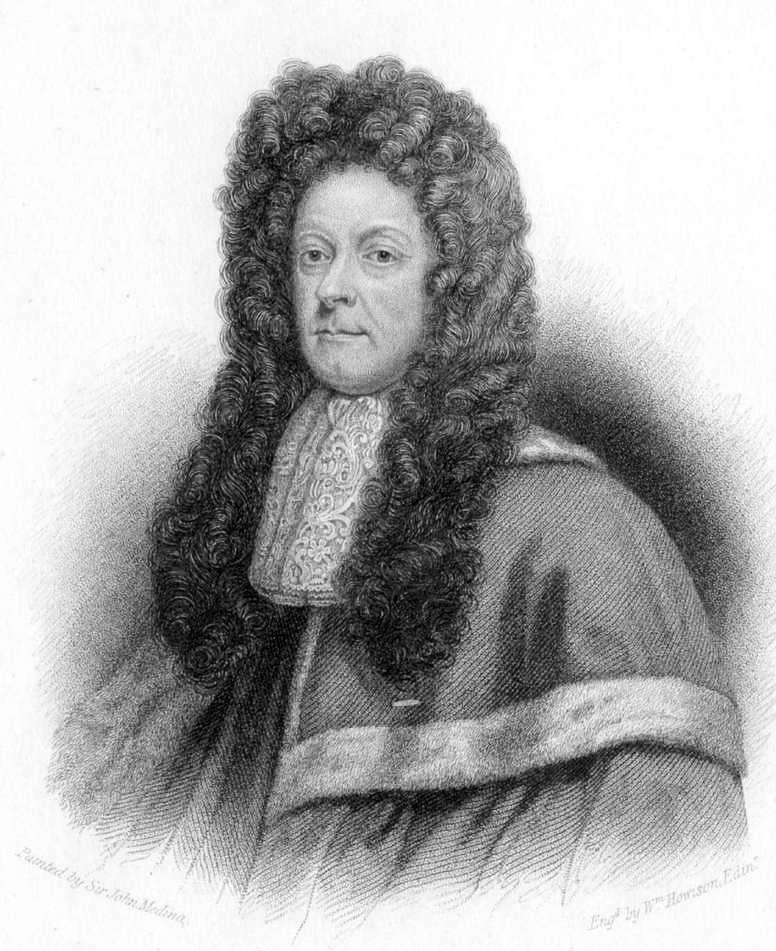
Sir James Dalrymple, Viscount of Stair

A number of works by academic authors, called institutional writers, have been identified as formal sources of law in Scotland since at least the 19th century. The exact list of authors and works, and whether it can be added to, is a matter of controversy. The generally accepted list of institutional works are:

- Sir Thomas Craig of Riccarton's Jus Feudale (1603);
- Sir James Dalrymple, Viscount of Stair's Institutions of the law of Scotland (1681);
- Andrew MacDouall, Lord Bankton's An Institute of the Laws of Scotland (1751–1753);
- John Erskine of Carnock's An Institute of the Law of Scotland (1773); and,
- George Joseph Bell's Commentaries on the Law of Scotland and on the Principles of Mercantile Jurisprudence (1804) and Principles of the Law of Scotland (1829).

Some commentators would also consider the following works to be included:

- Sir George Mackenzie of Rosehaugh's The Institutions of the Law of Scotland (1684);
- John Erskine of Carnock's Principles of the Law of Scotland (1754); and,
- Henry Home, Lord Kames' Principles of Equity (1760)

The recognition of the authority of the institutional writers was gradual and developed with the significance in the 19th century of stare decisis. The degree to which these works are authoritative is not exact. The view of University of Edinburgh Professor Sir Thomas Smith was, "the authority of an institutional writer is approximately equal to that of a decision by a Division of the Inner House of the Court of Session".

=== Custom ===
John Erskine of Carnock, an institutional writer, described legal custom as, "that which, without any express enactment by the supreme power, derives force from its tacit consent; which consent is presumed from the inveterate or immemorial usage of the community." Legal custom in Scotland today largely plays a historical role, as it has been gradually eroded by statute and the development of the institutional writers' authority in the 19th century. Some examples do persist in Scotland, such as the influence of Udal law in Orkney and Shetland. However, its importance is largely historic with the last court ruling to cite customary law being decided in 1890.

== Legal institutions ==
=== Government of Scotland ===
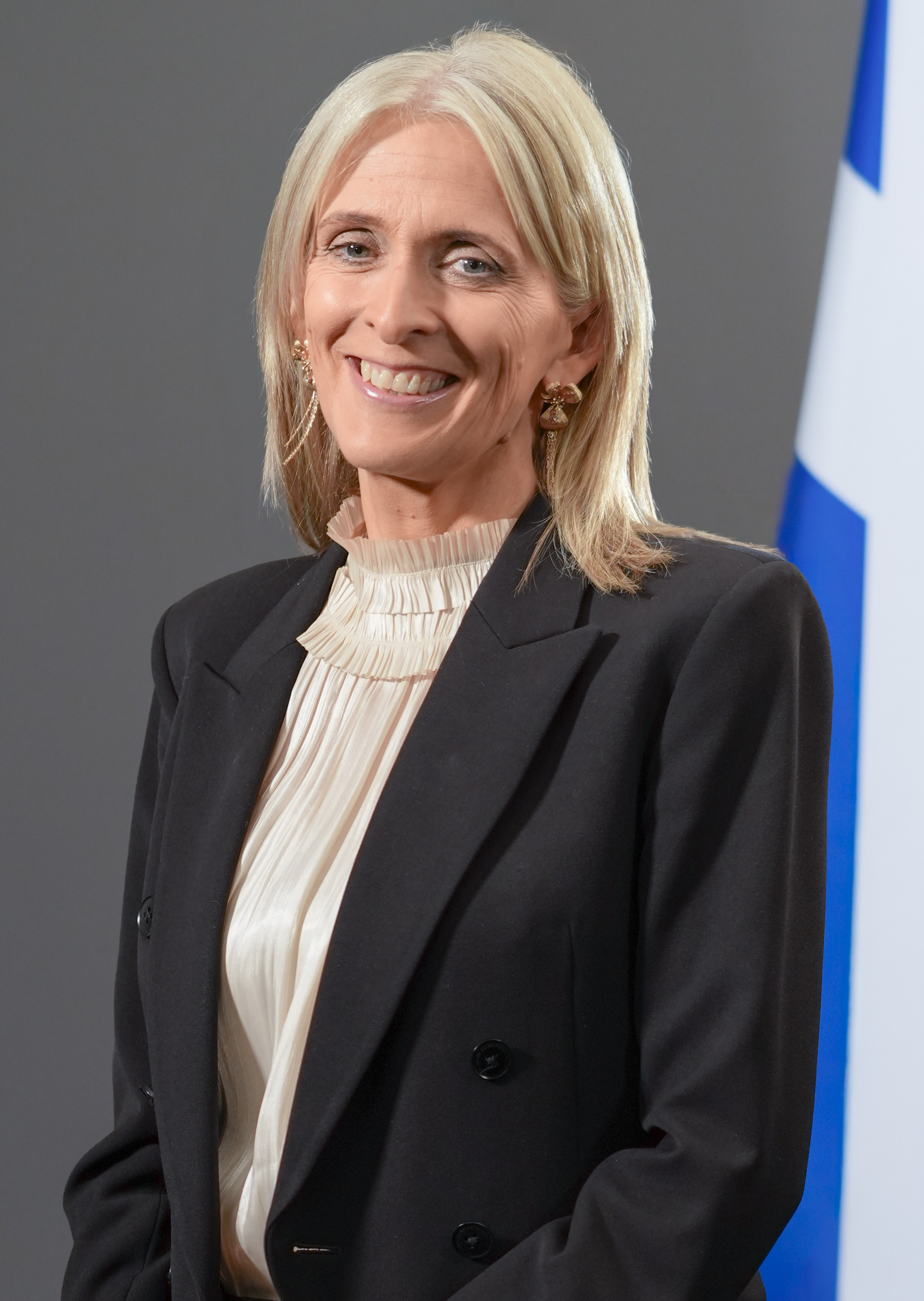
Ruth Charteris
Lord Advocate
since 2026

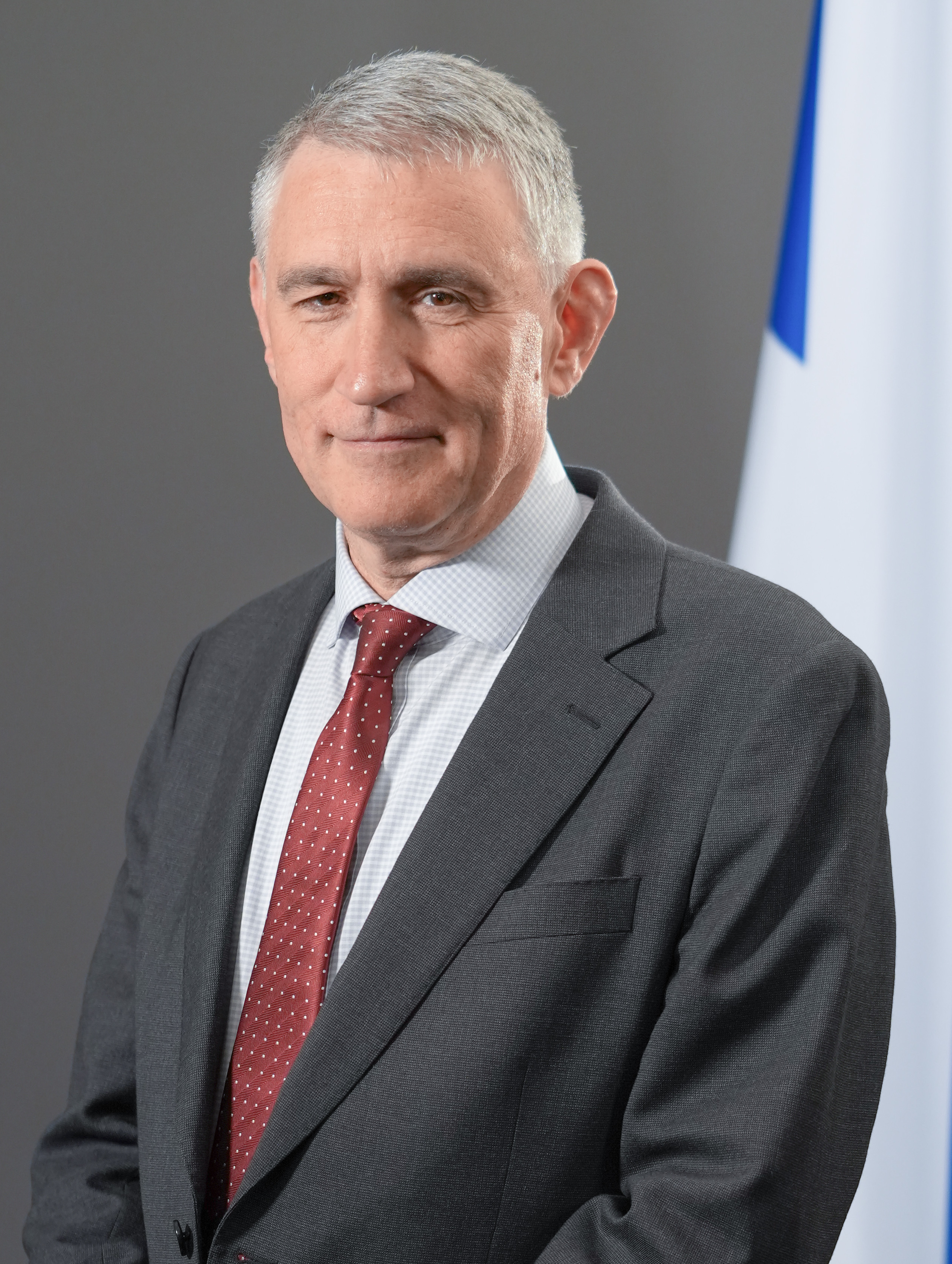
B. J. Gill
Solicitor General for Scotland
since 2026

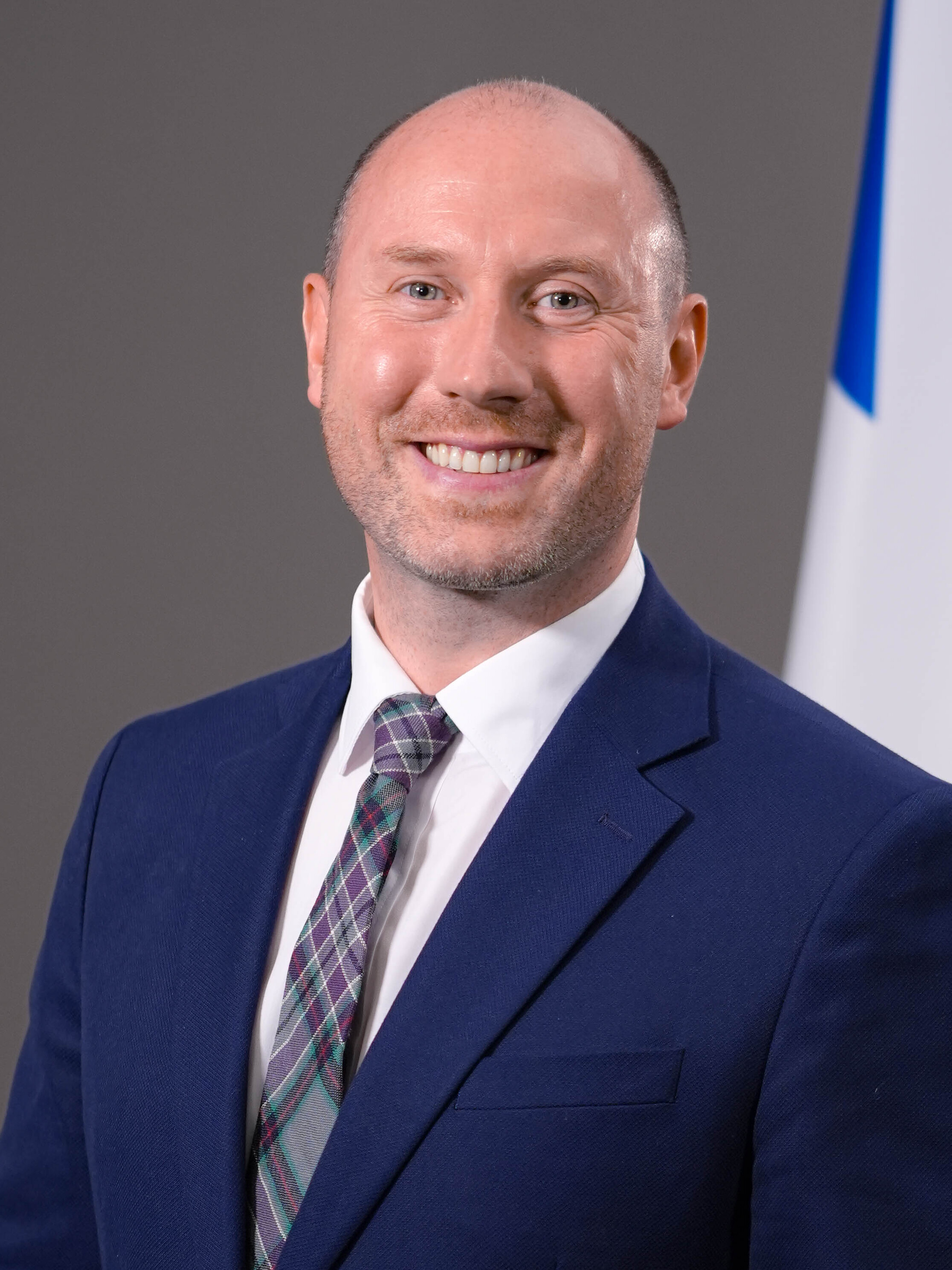
Neil Gray MSP
Cabinet Secretary for Justice
since 2026

The Scottish Government, led by the first minister, is responsible for formulating policy and implementing laws passed by the Scottish Parliament. The Scottish Parliament nominates one of its members to be appointed as first minister by the King. The first minister is assisted by various cabinet secretaries with individual portfolios and remits, who are appointed by the first minister with the approval of Parliament. Ministers are similarly appointed to assist cabinet secretaries in their work. The Scottish law officers, (the Lord Advocate and Solicitor General) can be appointed from outside the Parliament's membership, but are subject to its approval. The first minister, the cabinet secretaries, ministers and the Scottish law officers are the members of the Scottish Government. They are collectively known as the "Scottish Ministers".

The Scottish Government has executive responsibility for the Scottish legal system, with functions exercised by the Cabinet Secretary for Justice. The Justice Secretary has political responsibility for policing and law enforcement, the courts of Scotland, the Scottish Prison Service, fire services, civil emergencies and civil justice.

=== Legislature ===
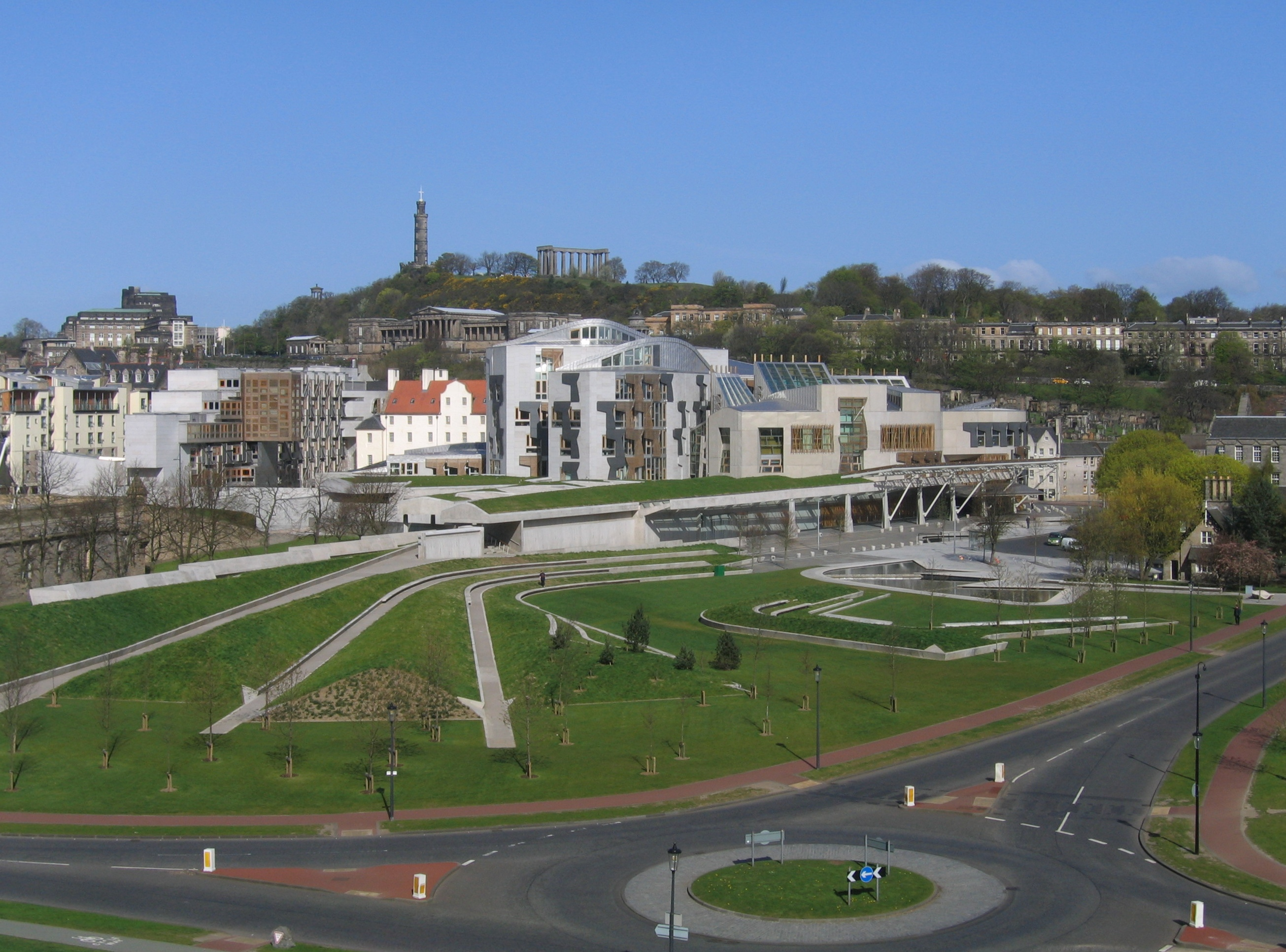
The Scottish Parliament located in Edinburgh has devolved powers to legislate for Scotland.

Many areas of Scots law are legislated for by the Scottish Parliament, in matters devolved from the Parliament of the United Kingdom. Areas of Scots law over which the Scottish Parliament has competency include health, education, criminal justice, local government, environment and civil justice amongst others. However, certain powers are reserved to Westminster including defence, international relations, fiscal and economic policy, drugs law, and broadcasting. The Scottish Parliament also has been granted limited tax raising powers. Although technically the Parliament of the United Kingdom retains full power to legislate for Scotland, under the Sewel convention it will not normally legislate on devolved matters without the agreement of the Scottish Parliament.

=== Courts of Scotland ===
==== Scottish Courts and Tribunals Service ====
All Scottish courts, except for the Court of the Lord Lyon, are administered by the Scottish Courts and Tribunals Service (SCTS). The SCTS is a non-ministerial government department with a corporate board chaired by the Lord President of the Court of Session (the head of the judiciary of Scotland.)

==== Criminal courts ====
===== Justice of the peace courts =====
Less serious criminal offences which can be dealt with under summary procedure are handled by local justice of the peace courts. The maximum penalty which a normal justice of the peace can impose is 60 days imprisonment or a fine not exceeding £2,500.

===== Sheriff courts =====
Sheriff courts act as district criminal courts, organised by sheriffdom, and deal with cases under both summary and solemn procedure. Cases can be heard either before a summary sheriff, a sheriff, or a sheriff and a jury. The maximum penalty which the sheriff court can impose, where heard just by a sheriff or summary sheriff, is 12 months imprisonment or a fine not exceeding £10,000. A case before a sheriff and jury can result in imprisonment for up to five years, or an unlimited fine.

Appeals against summary convictions and sentences are heard by the Sheriff Appeal Court, and decisions of the Sheriff Appeal Court can only be appealed with leave to the High Court of Justiciary and then only on questions of law.

===== High Court of Justiciary =====
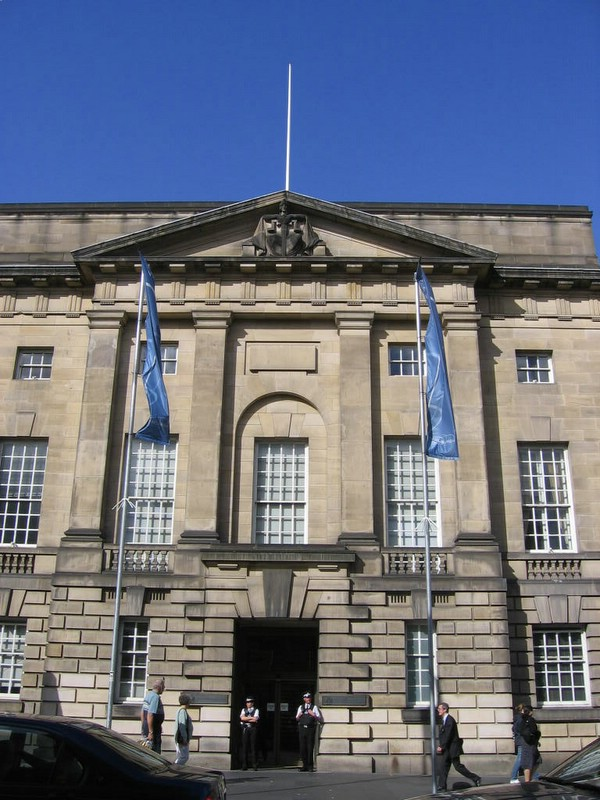
High Court of Justiciary, located in Edinburgh

More serious crimes, and appeals from solemn proceedings in the sheriff courts, are heard by the High Court of Justiciary. There is no appeal available in criminal cases to the Supreme Court of the United Kingdom, with respect to points of criminal law. Cases where the accused alleges a breach of the European Convention on Human Rights or European law can also be referred or appealed to the UK Supreme Court for a ruling on the relevant alleged breach. In these cases the UK Supreme Court is the successor to the Appellate Committee of the House of Lords as the highest civil court having taken over the judicial functions of the House of Lords and the Privy Council from 2009.

==== Civil courts ====
===== Sheriff courts =====
Sheriff courts also act as district civil courts with exclusive jurisdiction over all cases worth not more than £100,000, unless they are particularly complicated or of significant importance. Personal injury actions may also be heard at the specialist all-Scotland Sheriff Personal Injury Court, which has the power to hear cases before a jury. Decisions of a sheriff court are appealed to the Sheriff Appeal Court. Further appeals are possible to the Inner House of the Court of Session, but only with the permission of either the Sheriff Appeal Court, or the Court of Session. Such appeals are granted if there is an important point of principle, or other compelling reason. Appeals may finally be taken to the Supreme Court of the United Kingdom, but only with the leave of either the Inner House or the Supreme Court itself, and it relates to a general point of public interest in the law.

===== Court of Session =====
Complicated or high-value cases can be heard at first instance by the Outer House of the Court of Session, with the Court of Session having concurrent jurisdiction for all cases with a monetary value of more than £100,000. Decisions of the Outer House are appealed to the Inner House of the Court of Session, and (where allowed by the Inner House, or in matters relative to devolution) then to the Supreme Court of the United Kingdom.

Scottish courts may make a reference for a preliminary ruling to the Court of Justice of the European Union in cases involving European law.

==== Specialist courts ====
There are also a number of specialist courts and tribunals that have been created to hear specific types of disputes. These include children's hearings, the Lands Tribunal for Scotland, the Scottish Land Court and the Court of the Lord Lyon. The Employment Appeal Tribunal is also an example of a cross-jurisdictional tribunal.

=== Judiciary of Scotland ===
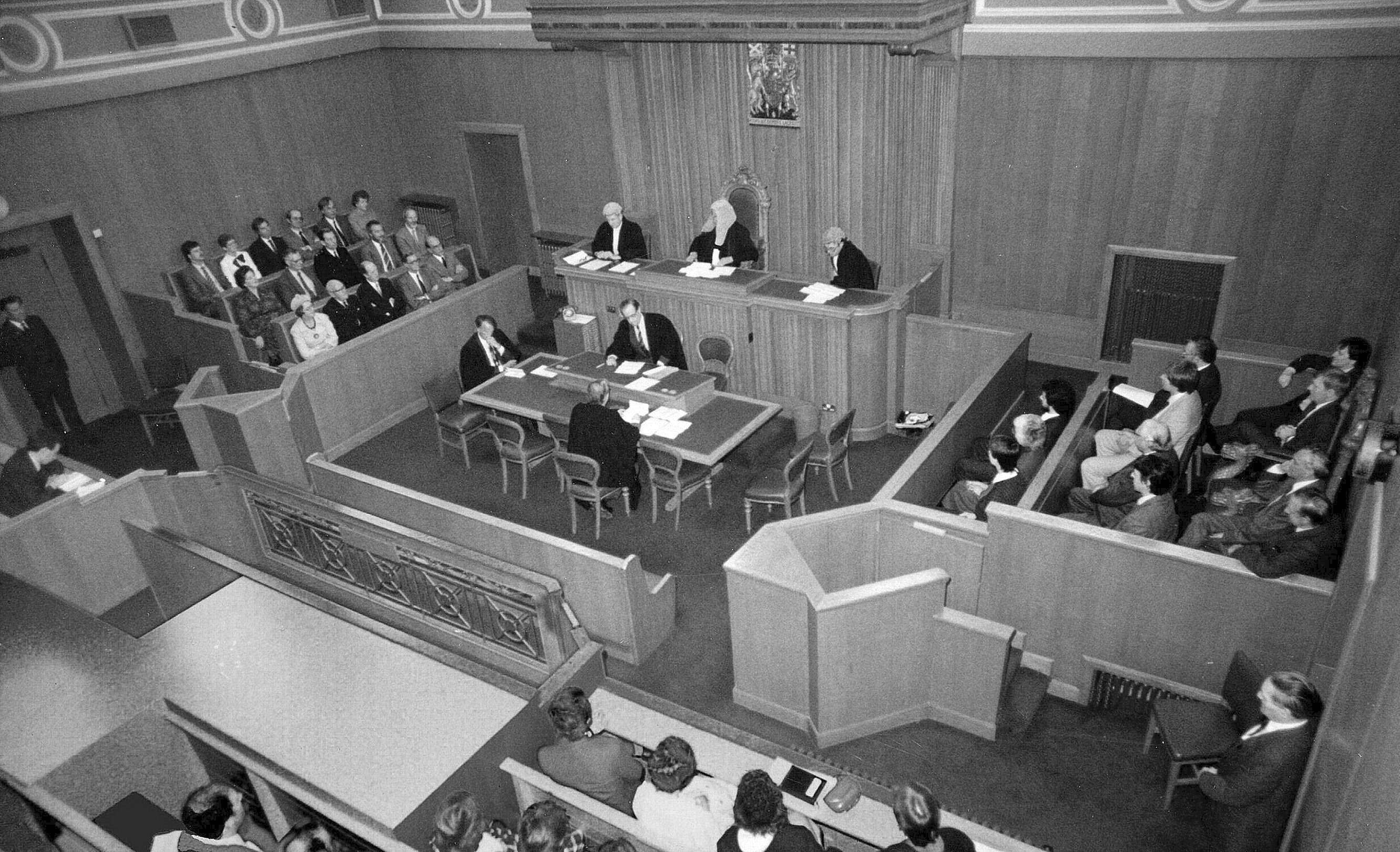
A Sheriff Court in session in Dundee

Scotland has several classes of judge who sit in the various courts of Scotland, and led by the Lord President of the Court of Session who is head of the Scottish judiciary by virtue of Section 2 of the Judiciary and Courts (Scotland) Act 2008. The second most senior judge is the Lord Justice Clerk, and together with the senators they constitute the College of Justice. The Senators are referred to as Lords of Council and Session when sitting in civil cases, and Lords Commissioners of Justiciary when sitting in criminal cases.

The sheriff courts are presided over by the sheriffs principal, sheriffs, and summary sheriffs. They will preside over both civil and criminal cases.

The most junior judges are the justices of the peace who preside over minor criminal matters in the justice of the peace courts.

=== Legal profession ===
The Scottish legal profession has two main branches, advocates and solicitors.

Advocates, the equivalent of the English barristers, belong to the Faculty of Advocates which distinguishes between junior counsel and senior counsel, the latter being designated King's or Queen's Counsel. Advocates specialise in presenting cases before Scottish courts and tribunals, with near-exclusive rights of audience, and in giving legal opinions. They usually receive instructions indirectly from clients through solicitors, though in many circumstances they can be instructed directly by members of certain professional associations.

Solicitors are members of the Law Society of Scotland and deal directly with their clients in all sorts of legal affairs. In the majority of cases they present their client's case to the court, and while traditionally they did not have the right to appear before the higher courts, since 1992 they have been able to apply for extended rights, becoming known as solicitor advocates. Notaries public, unlike their continental equivalent, are not members of a separate profession; they must be solicitors, and most solicitors are also notaries.

The Scottish Law Agents Society (SLAS) is a voluntary, national body representing solicitors in Scotland, operating independently under a royal charter. SLAS focuses solely on representation, avoiding conflicts of interest tied to regulation. SLAS addresses issues affecting solicitors, advocating for the profession's independence, and responding to reforms like the Regulation of Legal Services (Scotland) Bill 2023. As of 2023, the president of the Scottish Law Agents' Society is Mr Darren Murdoch, a solicitor based at Waddell and Mackinosh law firm in Troon, Ayrshire.

== See also ==
- List of Scottish legal cases
