= Welsh mortgage =

Obsolete form of mortgage

A Welsh mortgage is a now-obsolete form of mortgage which could be created under English law. Welsh mortgages were also used in other common law countries, including Ireland and Canada. The main differences between a Welsh mortgage and a conventional mortgage were that:

- under a Welsh mortgage the mortgagee (the lender) would receive all of the rents and profits which arise from the land during the period of the mortgage, whereas under a conventional mortgage the mortgagor (the landowner) would receive these; and
- under a Welsh mortgage the mortgagee had no power to call for or sue for the principal sum; it was only the mortgagor who could elect to bring the mortgage to an end by repaying the principal. Conversely, in a conventional mortgage the mortgagee could call for repayment of the principal amount after the repayment date and sue for it or foreclose if it was not paid.

The exact form fluctuated slightly. But Cooote on Mortgages described the concept as follows:

A Welsh mortgage in its original and strict form closely resembled the mortuum vadium described by Glanville, being a conveyance of an estate, redeemable at any time on payment of the principal without interest: the rents and profits of the estate until such redemption being taken without account by the mortgagee in lieu of interest.

Welsh mortgages were not subject to foreclosure. Technically there is no period for redemption. However if the mortgagor 'holds over' for a period of time which is sufficient to defeat a limitation claim, then the right to redeem is lost.

Early twentieth century legal writers sought to draw a loose parallel between Welsh mortgages and the vivum vadium (or living pledge), an ancient form of mortgage in Medieval conveyancing, whilst also noting that the parallels were inexact.

== Variations ==
Certain types of variations on the tradition Welsh mortgage evolved over times. Robins' Law of Mortgages describes these:

Another kind of Welsh mortgage, or security in the nature of a Welsh mortgage, rather resembling the ancient form of vivum vadium, is where an estate is assured to the mortgagee in fee or for a long term of years until out of the rents and profits he shall have received the amount of principal and interest.

A third variation on this form of security is, where an estate is demised to the mortgagee for a short term of years, to the intent that he may take the rents and profits during the term in lieu and full satisfaction of principal and interest, with a proviso for redemption at any time during the term of payment of principal and interest then due. On the expiration of the term the property will revert to the mortgage discharged from the debt.

== Time period ==
The earliest recorded reference to a Welsh mortgage dates from 1726.

The latest reported case involving a Welsh mortgage is an Irish case: Re Cromin (1914) 1 IR 23 at 29.

By 1927 they were already being described as 'obsolete'.

== Etymology ==
The description of this type of mortgage as a 'Welsh mortgage' reflects the fact that under Welsh law (Cyfraith Hywel or 'The Laws of Hywel Dda') land was not freely alienable since it was not the property of the individual who held it but of his family and would be divided between his sons on his death. There was, however, a method of parting with possession of it, known in Welsh as prido, under which the land could in effect be loaned to another person for a short period of time, permitting that other person to enjoy its profits during the period of the prid but requiring him to yield it up to the original holder at the end of that period. The duty to do so could be made conditional on the repayment of an advance made in consideration of the prid and the arrangement therefore closely resembled the common law vivum vadium or vifgage. The survival of such arrangements in Wales up until the abolition of Welsh law in 1536, after the corresponding common law arrangement had become obsolete, apparently led to the latter (which continued in use in Ireland and North America for many years) being referred to as a 'Welsh mortgage'
