= Procedural records =

Procedural records are the set of constituent parts of a judicial process or administrative process, such as the petitions, terms of hearing, certificates, among others. Traditionally, they have always been in physical format, but with the advent of the electronic process, they have gradually been replaced by records in electronic format.

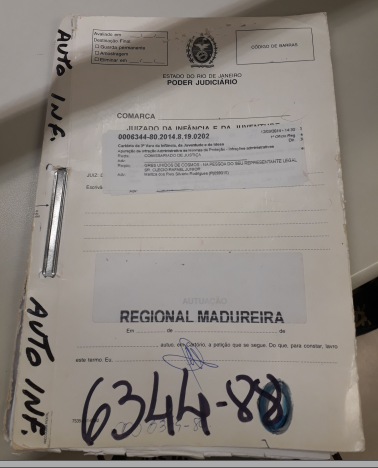
Example of physical procedural records in the Court of Justice of the State of Rio de Janeiro.

The physical records are made up of a jumble of papers, which are held together by staples, plastic tracks, or brackets ("ballerinas" for holding paper), and which usually have a cover. In these volumes of papers, the acts of each process are recorded. The records are worked on by civil servants, usually from the judiciary, but also from other branches of government, in the case of administrative proceedings. The parties, or their lawyers, have access to view them, and sometimes, the latter can remove them from the custody of the state for a certain period of time, committing to return them intact. Every procedural act, even in physical processes, is usually registered in an electronic system, for better monitoring. Eventually, if the physical records are lost, they can be reconstituted by means of copies of the fundamental documents.

In the electronic process, the records are entirely in electronic format.

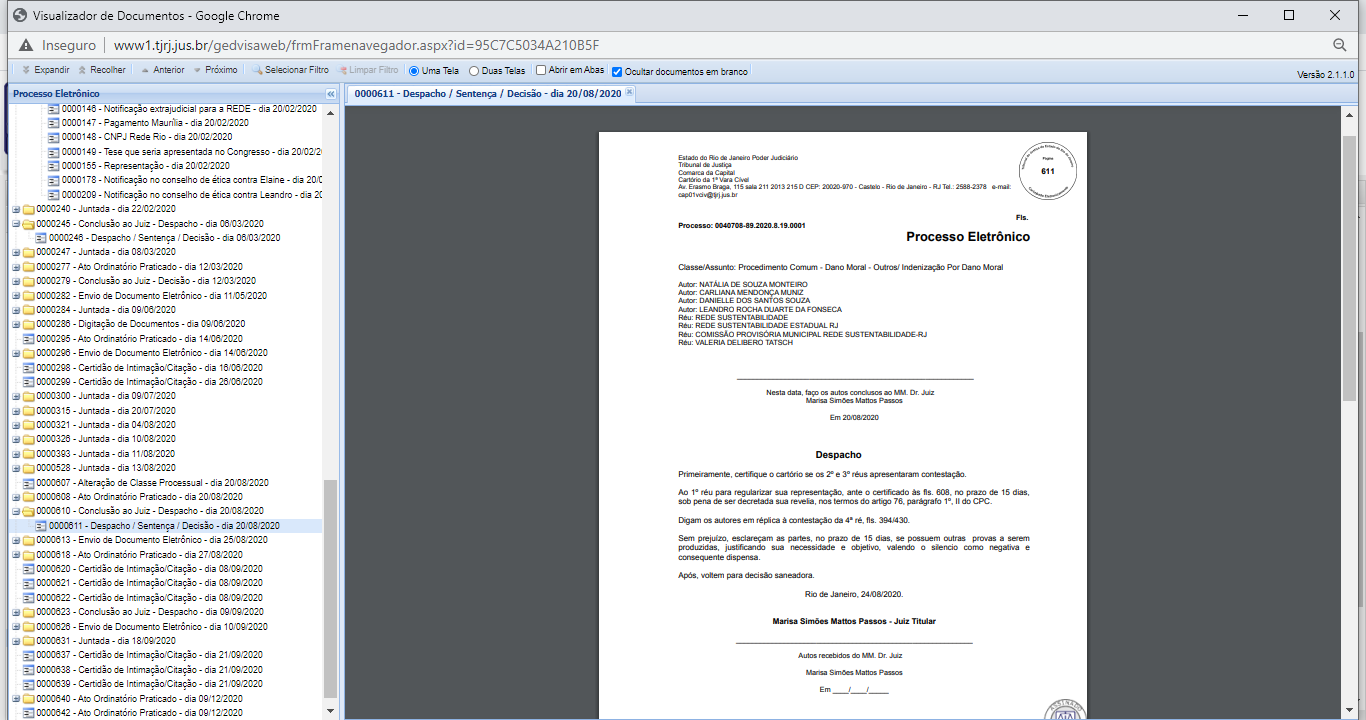
Example of electronic procedural records in the Court of Justice of the State of Rio de Janeiro.

The beginning of computerization of processes took place in Germany in 1966, when the Federal Commission for the Computerization and Rationalization of Justice was created. Other countries, such as Italy, the United States and Portugal, have also started to adopt the computerization of notary services. With the popularization of the Internet, in the late 1990s and early 2000s, experiences of implementing fully digital autos were made possible. In Brazil, it has been observed that the implementation of fully electronic proceedings has contributed to the reduction of the time it takes to process cases.

In Brazil, in November 2020, electronic records of the Superior Court of Justice were attacked and encrypted by hackers, in what is considered the largest hacker attack in the country's history.
