= Merritt (company) =

- Company type: Private
- Industry: Corporate services, legal services
- Founded: 1998 (first company established in Hong Kong)
- Area served: Hong Kong, United Arab Emirates (UAE), United States
- Services: Company formation, corporate services, legal consultancy, residency services
- Website: merritt.group

Merritt is an international network of companies that provides corporate services, legal consultancy, and resident services with a presence in Hong Kong, the United Arab Emirates (UAE), and the United States.

== History ==
The first company in Merritt’s network was established in 1998 in Hong Kong. The network’s initial Hong Kong operations previously used the names Asia Services and Hai Yang before the adoption of the Merritt brand. The first company was founded by four accountants from Hong Kong and Mainland China.

In 2004, the group introduced French speaking services and in 2009 Spanish speaking services. The network expanded to the UAE in 2009, opening offices in Dubai.

In 2012, French and Spanish speaking services were centralized in Dubai to streamline operations and align business hours with clients based in Europe. The network continued its expansion in 2017 with the opening of offices in Orlando, Florida.

In 2019, following the retirement of the founders, a foundation was established to consolidate the network’s entities under one structure, and the brand name Merritt was adopted across operations in the UAE, Hong Kong, and the United States.

== Corporate structure ==
Merritt is a privately held network of companies rather than a single legal entity. Companies described as part of the network include Merritt Middle East DMCC (Dubai, UAE), Merritt USA LLC (Orlando, Florida, United States), Merritt Asia Limited (Tsim Sha Tsui, Hong Kong), and Merritt Legal Consultants FZ-LLC (Ras Al Khaimah, UAE).
