= Company formation =

UK process of incorporation of a business

Company formation is the term for the process of incorporation of a business in the UK. It is also sometimes referred to as company registration. These terms are both also used when incorporating a business in the Republic of Ireland. Under UK company law and most international law, a company or corporation is considered an entity that is separate from the people who own or operate the company.

Forming a company via the paper filing method can take up to 4 weeks but nowadays the majority of UK companies are formed the same day electronically. Companies can be created by individuals, specialised agents, solicitors or accountants. Many solicitors and accountants subcontract incorporation out to specialised company formation agents. Most agents offer company formation packages for less than £100.

== Formation processes ==
=== Historical processes ===
A legal instrument known as a deed of settlement was used in 18th century England to regulate the activities of companies structured as joint stock companies, permitting a private company to form a corporation without applying for a royal charter or an act of Parliament. The deed of settlement named the individuals of the company as trustees of the assets jointly owned by the company. It also served to outline the rules applicable to the company's management.

=== Paper process ===
Under section 9 of the Companies Act 2006, those forming a company must send the following documents, together with the registration fee, to the Registrar of Companies.

Most incorporations submitted by paper take around 5 working days to be accepted. For detailed information see the Companies House guide.

The cost of carrying out paper filing directly with Companies House is £20 for an unlimited company or £40 for a limited company. This fee does not include the cost of witnessing documents or preparation of memorandum & articles of association for the company, which would usually be carried out by a solicitor, accountant, or agent specialising in company registration.

==== Articles of association ====
The articles of association (often referred to as just ‘articles’) is the document which sets out the rules for the running of the company's internal affairs. The company's articles are delivered to the Registrar at incorporation. In the event that no articles are registered for the new company, the model (default) articles will be registered. This new procedure was introduced by the Companies Act 2006, Section 20.

The articles can be amended at any time by special resolution which requires 75% or more of the eligible shareholder votes to be cast in favour of the resolution. A copy of the updated articles of association, together with the special resolution itself, should be delivered to Companies House within 15 days of the resolution passing.

==== Form IN01 ====
This contains the intended situation of the Registered Office, (this will be either in England and Wales, Northern Ireland, Scotland or Wales), the details of the consenting Secretary and Director(s), details of the subscribers and, in the case of a company limited by shares, details of the share capital. The form also includes the Statement of Compliance that the requirements of the Companies Act have been complied with.

==== Memorandum of association ====
This contains the names and signatures of the subscribers that wish to form the company and, in the case of a company limited by shares, a commitment by the subscribers to take percentage of shares as contribution been made. A draft template is available on the Companies House website. It sets out the constitution of a company and the foundation on which the structure of a company is based. In other words, a memorandum of association is considered the charter or constitution of the company because it lays down the objectives of the company precisely and clearly, defines the scope of its relation with the investor and outside world.

=== Electronic process ===
The electronic process can be accessed using compatible software that works with the Companies House eFiling service and an account with Companies House. Company formation agents have direct links into Companies House, to look up the company name, and submit the company. Different agents have differences in their processes caused by their website and software implementation. Companies House have a list of company formation agents that have passed integration testing.

== Types of company ==
The following can be formed by registration at Companies House:

- Public limited company (plc)
- Private company limited by shares (Ltd, Limited)
- Company limited by guarantee
- Unlimited company
- Limited liability partnership (LLP)
- Limited partnership (LP)
- Community interest company (CIC)
- Joint venture

== See also ==
- Incorporation (business) - US perspective
- List of company registers
