= Regiam Majestatem =

Early Scottish Law

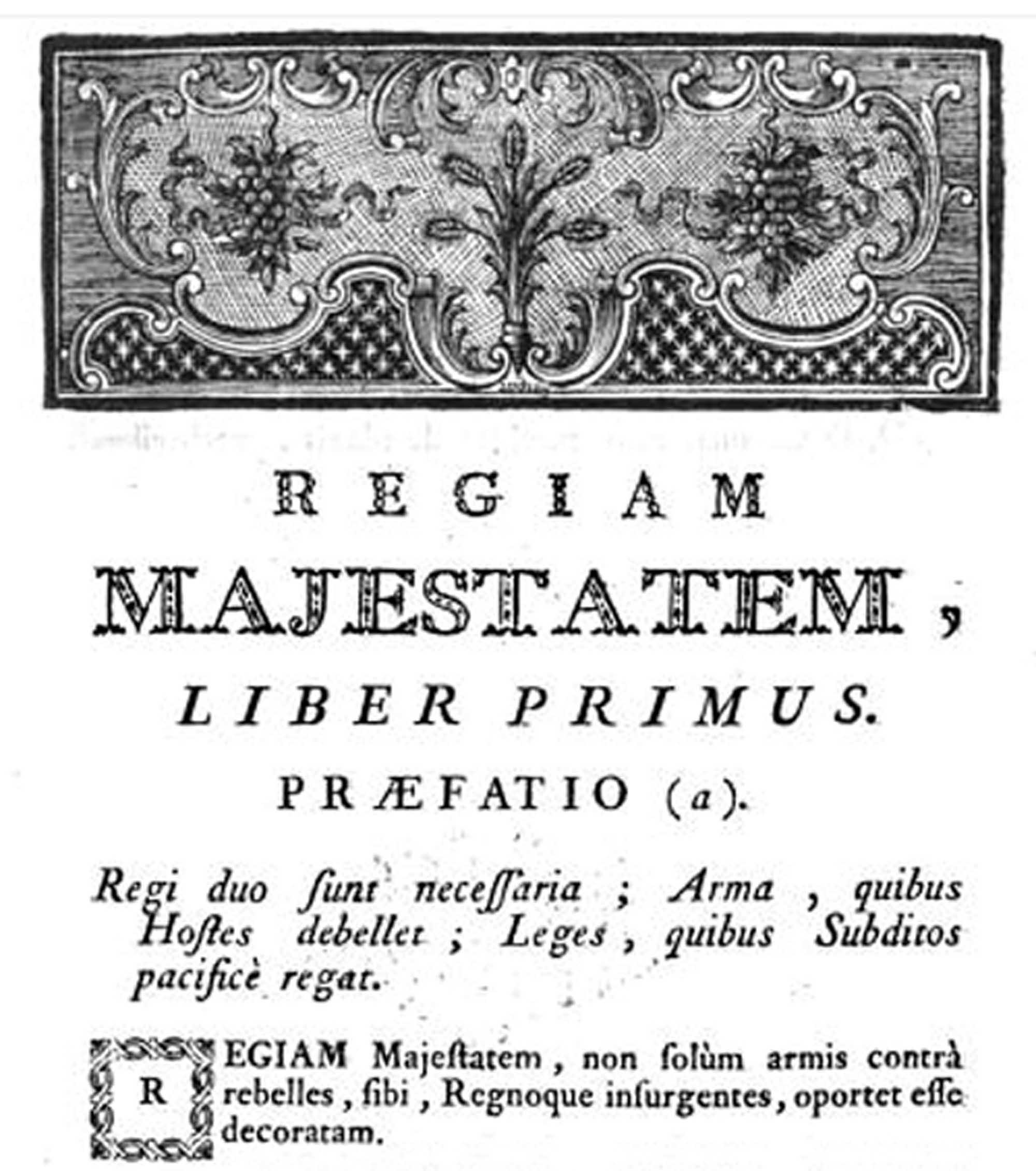
The beginning of the preface of the Regiam Majestatem, from which the document gets its name.

The Regiam Majestatem is the earliest surviving work giving a comprehensive digest of the Law of Scotland. The name of the document is derived from its first two words. It consists of four books, treating (1) civil actions and jurisdictions, (2) judgments and executions, (3) contracts, and (4) crimes.

Dating from the early fourteenth century, it is largely based on the 1188 Tractatus de legibus et consuetudinibus regni Angliae (Treatise on the laws and customs of the Kingdom of England) of Ranulf de Glanvill, and incorporates features of thirteenth century canon law, the Summa in Titulos Decretalium of Goffredus of Trano, and the Scottish Celtic Laws of the Brets and Scots.

The documentary basis of Scots law had been largely destroyed by the confiscations of Edward I of England in the thirteenth century and by two devastating English invasions led by Edward I and Edward III in the thirteenth and fourteenth centuries. When the Regiam Majestatem was discovered in the early fifteenth century after Scotland's legal provenance had been destroyed, it was immediately embraced as an authoritative source of law, surviving as such into the modern era.

Sir John Skene had compiled and edited versions of the document at his own expense, and this was published by the Parliament of Scotland in 1609. Skene's version is not entirely consistent with the original document, but it held up as the standard version. Later legal references to the document are references to the 1609 publication.

== Ancestry ==
The Regiam Majestatem was written perhaps as early as the time of Robert the Bruce (reigned 1306 – 1329), and certainly later than 1318, as a statute from that date was included in it. The details of how this was accomplished are unknown, as is the identity of the author.

=== Background ===
In the events leading up to his invasion of Scotland, Edward I of England (reigned 1272–1307) forced himself upon Scotland in the role of feudal overlord, far beyond the guiding and consultative role that the Scots had asked him to play. During this time he signed a writ in 1291 that required the collection of all documents that might concern his own claims of superiority over Scotland, or the claims of others. (Note: The writ required the collection of ".... all the charters instruments rolls and writs whatsoever that might concern the rights of the competitors, or his own pretended title to the superiority of Scotland, to be carried off and placed where he should appoint; and these to be put into the hands of five persons, two Scots and three English; and these last to act by themselves, if the two first happened to be hindered.") The writ was executed, and between that and the depredations during Edward's invasion of Scotland in 1296, virtually every important Scottish legal document was lost forever.

The Scots successfully maintained their freedom in the First War of Scottish Independence, which ended de facto with the Battle of Bannockburn in 1314, ending de jure in 1328 with the Treaty of Edinburgh–Northampton. Effective government required a legal basis and its documentation, and the Scots were forced to rebuild their legal provenance quickly.

=== Origin ===
The origin of the contents of the Regiam Majestatem is largely from Glanvill's Tractatus. About two-thirds of the work was adopted without change from it, parts of the remainder are similar to it, and the rest is unrelated to it. This last category includes most of the fourth book, which covers the treatment of crimes. Of the portions which do not originate with the Tractatus, their origins can be found in canon law, in the Summa in Titulos Decretalium of Goffredus of Trano, in the Laws of the Brets and Scots, and in earlier Scottish statutes.

The Tractatus was a work of originality intended to facilitate the implementation an effective judicial system in England, and it had proven to be a great success. The Scots were certainly aware of this, and it was likely chosen over other codifications because it best suited Scottish interests by providing a framework that had already proved itself to be successful, and one that addressed issues particular to Scottish law, but issues that mostly were common to both Scottish and English law. Where it was close to Scottish interests but not close enough, that is the likely origin of those portions of the Regiam Majestatem that appear only similar to the Tractatus. Nevertheless, the fit was not perfect, and there are artefacts from English law that do not fit well with Scottish customs.

=== Ancestral ancestry ===
- Glanvill's Tractatus – it is the book of authority on English common law, and has been studied and analysed in detail. There is consensus that the English law ultimately does not rely on earlier codifications. (Note: Norman law in England was a combination of Norman law in Normandy as modified to address perceived defects in it, inventions to address any problems unique to Norman control of England, and adaptations from the customs of the English when it suited Norman purposes. Also, a nascent but evolving feudalism had existed in England since the late tenth century, prior to the Norman invasion of 1066. The legal system was initiated by William the Conqueror (reigned 1066–1087) and fully in place in the time of Henry I (reigned 1100–1135), during which time English law evolved along its own path. Furthermore, the author of the Tractatus was familiar with Civil Law and Canon Law, had long practical experience in the administration of justice, and was intimately aware of weaknesses in the system and how best they might be corrected.) Scrutton noted the lack of a heritage owed to Roman law (i.e., the Corpus Juris Civilis) in the Tractatus, stating that some terminology was borrowed solely to be fitted into the book discussing Contracts (Tractatus, Book X), but that the terms were applied to English concepts. Pollock and Maitland, in their History of English Law Before the Time of Edward I, describe Glanvill's contracts as "purely Germanic", and state that the "law of earnest is not from Roman influence".
- Canon law
- Geoffrey's Decretal
- Laws of the Brets and Scots – Book IV of the Regiam Majestatem, covering crimes, incorporates chapters from this document, preserving the Celtic names for descriptions of people, kinship groups, and fines. Terms used include the cro, galnes, ogetharii ('ogthern'), and kelchyn. Fines are structured according to the class of the victim, the fines might be paid to the king or to the victim's kindred depending on the circumstances, and payments to be made are given in cattle or orae.
- earlier Scottish statutes
- Roman law

== The document ==
When the Regiam Majestatem was discovered in the fifteenth century, it was quickly embraced as a legal authority, the Parliament authorised commissions to examine it and repair defects (1425 c. 54, 1487 c. 115), and it was cited in statutes of the era. It has remained an authoritative source of Scotland's unique law into the modern era.

In 1607 the Parliament of Scotland passed an act for the publication of John Skene's compilation of the Regiam Majestatem, to be funded by the government, and Skene's version was published in 1609. The work has been criticised for its many inconsistencies with the original document, for its lack of scholarly rigour, and for other sloppiness. Nevertheless, the work was meritorious and valuable, and it brought fresh understanding to ancient Scottish law. It is Skene's version that became the legal standard from that time forward.

=== Contents ===
The Regiam Majestatem derives its name from the first two words of its first chapter, which serves as the Præfacio (Preface). It begins:

"Regiam Majestatem, non solum armis contra rebelles, sibi, Regnoque insurgentes, oportet esse decoratam."

This opening is based on that of the Institutes of Justinian: "Imperatoriam majestatem non solum armis decoratam sed legibus . . . oportet esse armatam."

Regiam Majestatem, Books I – IV (in Latin)
Lib.	Caput	Contents
I	I – XXXI	Civil actions and jurisdictions – including discussion of the brieve of right (i.e., the legal writ used for settling property disputes), the requirement of a unanimous verdict by 12 men in disputes between pursuer (i.e., the plaintiff) and defender, regulations guaranteeing sales of land and moveables, and pactions (i.e., agreements) both real and personal, profitable and unprofitable.
II	I – LXXIV	De Judiciis – Judgments and executions – including discussions of the role of arbiters, bondage and manumission, the terce (i.e., the widow's share of an estate), and inheritance.
III	I – XXXVI	De Debitis Laicorum – Contracts – including debts, buying, selling, and pledging.
IV	I – XL	De Placitis Criminalibus – Crimes – including lese majeste (i.e., killing the king), sedition, and felonies.

A list of assythments (i.e., assessments made as a result of judgments) is also given, but Skene thought that these were not authentic.

=== Versions ===
Versions of the Regiam Majestatem
Year	Description
1609	Sir John Skene's publication, in both Latin and Scots. There were folio republications in 1613 and 1681, and a Scots language republication in 1774. It is the subsequent legal standard, but is not everywhere in agreement with the original document.
1776	David Hoüard's publication, in Latin with annotation in French, and based on that of Skene.
1844	Thomas Thomson's printing in Acts of the Parliaments of Scotland, I, 597 – 641.
1947	Lord Cooper's printing and translation, based on that of Skene.

== Miscellaneous notices ==
=== Laws of the Burghs ===
Two of the Laws of the Burghs cite the Regiam Majestatem as their origin. These are:

- Quibus modis de servitute ad libertatem pervenitur (The way in which a man may become free from servitude) – by living quietly for a year and a day in a privileged town (i.e., a Royal burgh), and not be challenged by his master nor be known as his master's servant.
- De heredibus burgensium (Anent the heirs of burgesses) – the heir of a burgess comes of age when he can count silver, or measure cloth, or do other of his father's business and affairs.

=== Scottish legal terms ===
Scottish legal terms found in the Regiam Majestatem include:

- Amerciamentum – used to signify a fine for absence.
- Arreragium – used to signify arrears of rents, profits, and duties.
- Attachiamentum – used to signify a charge or binding of a person, to the effect he may be compelled to appear to answer in judgement. It also signifies an attachment of goods and effects by arrestment or otherwise.
- Breve de nova dissasina – the brieve or summons of ejection or spulyie (i.e., regarding theft or despoliation). The Breve de recto, or Brieve of right, was anciently used before the Justice-General, and was transferred to the Lords of Council and Session as early as the period of the Regiam Majestatem.
- Clarificatio – defined as the clearance given by the verdict of an assize.
- Coroner, or Crouner – John Skene says that the word occurs in the Regiam Majestatem, but this is considered to be an error on his part.
- Deodand – a term in English law referring to the forfeiture of moveable property that has been the immediate cause of death to a person, to be given over to pious uses (the word literally means 'dedicated or devoted to God'). In Scotland, a jury sets the value of the moveable property, which acts as a fine if the property owner is found liable. Skene's Regiam Majestatem says a similar forfeiture was known to have been in Scotland's older law.
- Quia Emptores – identical to an English statute of 1290, and the Regiam Majestatem contains a verbatim transcript of that statute. The English statute has its origins in the Tractatus, as well as in subsequent documents.

=== An alternative origin ===
It is not known whether the Regiam Majestatem was immediately put into effect, or whether it had been intended to be put it into effect at a later date. Whichever the case, it did not matter because Scotland would suffer a Second War of Scottish Independence (1332–1371) when it was invaded by Edward III of England, its king David II was captured by the English, and in the ensuing devastation the Regiam Majestatem became lost, not being rediscovered until the next century. When found, it was hailed as an ancient Scottish relic that had somehow survived the confiscations of Edward I and the depredations and devastation caused by the two invasions.

There was little documentation remaining from that tumultuous time to offer either proof or disproof of the origins of the Regiam Majestatem. Consequently, and not without chauvinism, some Scots insisted on a native origin for the Regiam Majestatem, offering it as another product of the dynamic David I (reigned 1124 – 1153). This assertion persisted until well into the nineteenth century, though scholarly research had rendered the contention untenable in the eighteenth century, such as by notice of statutes in the document that could not pre-date the thirteenth and fourteenth century.

== See also ==
- English law
- Scots law
