= Geoffrey of Trani =

Italian jurist and cardinal

Geoffrey of Trani (? in Trano, Apulia – 1245) was an Italian jurist, known as a canon lawyer. He was a student at Bologna of Azo before becoming a professor at Naples, then at Bologna. He was made a cardinal deacon by Pope Innocent IV. His Summa super titulis decretalium and other writings on decretals became a basic resource for canon law.
