= Legal process =

Any formal notice or writ by a court obtaining jurisdiction over a person or property

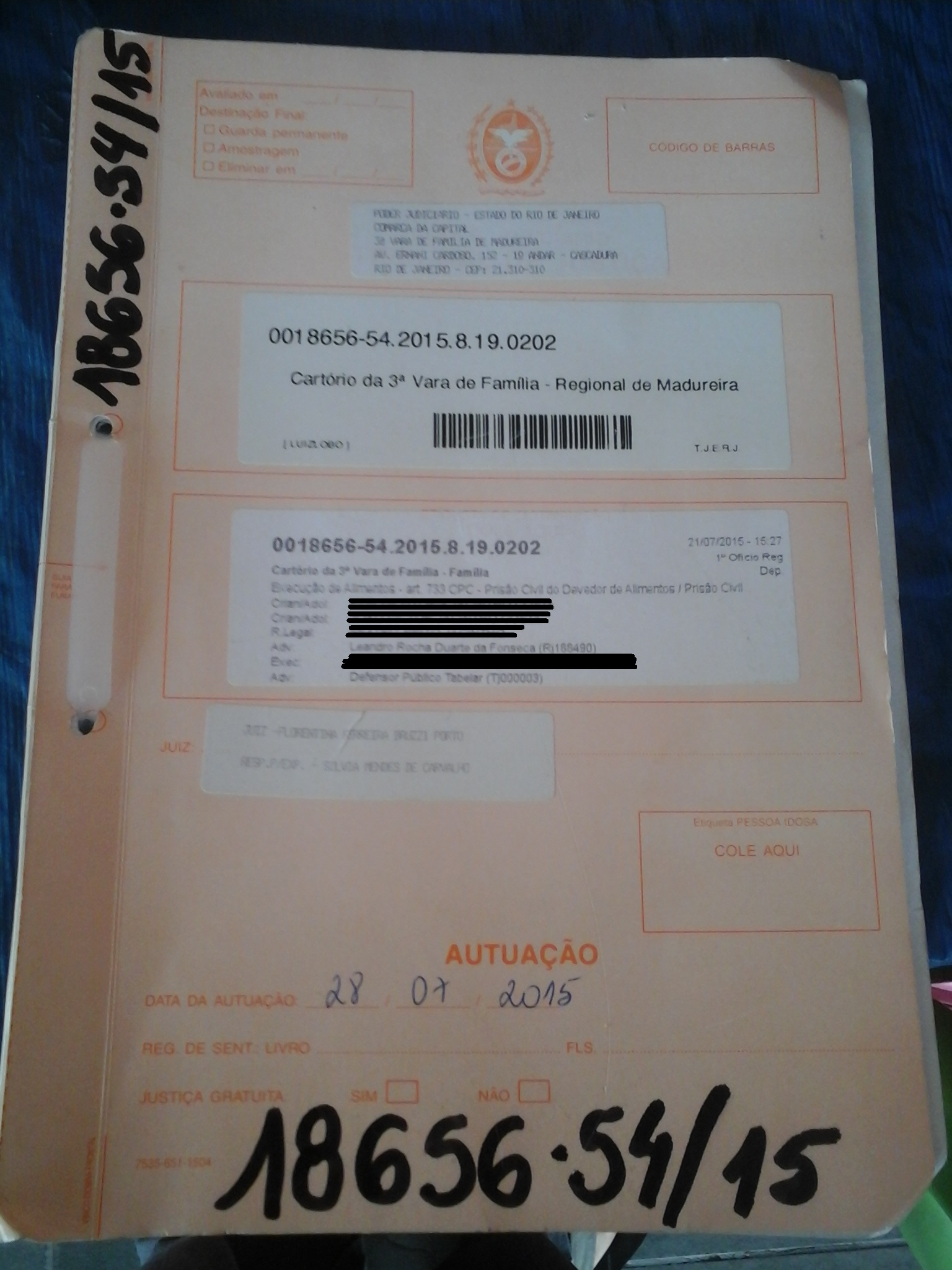
Example of physical procedural records from the Court of Justice of the State of Rio de Janeiro.

Legal process (sometimes simply process) is any formal notice or writ by a court obtaining jurisdiction over a person or property. Common forms of process include a summons, subpoena, mandate, and warrant. Process normally takes effect by serving it on a person, arresting a person, posting it on real property, or seizing personal property.

== Abuse ==
An abuse of process is the unjustified or unreasonable use of legal proceedings or process to further a cause of action by an applicant or plaintiff in an action. It is a claim made by the respondent or defendant that the other party is misusing or perverting regularly issued court process (civil or criminal) not justified by the underlying legal action. In common law it is classified as a tort distinct from the intentional tort of malicious prosecution. It is a tort that involves misuse of the public right of access to the courts. In the United States it may be described as a legal process being commenced to gain an unfair litigation advantage.

The elements of a valid cause of action for abuse of process in most common law jurisdictions are as follows: (1) the existence of an ulterior purpose or motive underlying the use of process, and (2) some act in the use of the legal process not proper in the regular prosecution of the proceedings. Abuse of process can be distinguished from malicious prosecution, in that abuse of process typically does not require proof of malice, lack of probable cause in procuring issuance of the process, or a termination favorable to the plaintiff, all of which are essential to a claim of malicious prosecution. Typically, the person who abuses process is interested only in accomplishing some improper purpose that is collateral to the proper object of the process and that offends justice, such as an unjustified arrest or an unfounded criminal prosecution. Subpoenas to testify, attachments of property, executions on property, garnishments, and other provisional remedies are among the types of "process" considered to be capable of abuse.

== See also ==
- Civil procedure
- Due process
- Legal proceedings
- Legal process outsourcing
- Procedural law
- Trial
