= Electronic process of law =

Electronic process of law or Electronic lawsuit is an up-to-date phenomenon, concerning the use of computer programs in courts and public departments in sue activities. It is a theme of worldwide scope. In Portugal, it is known as the concept of processo eletrônico. In India, known as Electronic Judicial Resource Management. In France, it is called Dématerialisation du processus judiciaire. It is a polissemic expression related to interdisciplinarity between the information technologies and branches of law that govern the lawsuits that take place in departments of public administration; more specifically, the control, follow-up, searches and practices of juridical acts helped by computer systems. Its universal definition can be found in various sources.

== Internationally ==
Internationally, there is, in Virginia State, the Records Managements System. In Pakistan, the Court Automation. In England, the Legal Case Management Software There are sources of compared legislation about the matter, but it is certain that this phenomenon takes places in United States, Europe and also in Latin America.

== Meanings of the expression ==
In a wide sense, it is the use of computers and specific software for the activities in process of law, relative to management, legislation or jurisdiction. In a strict sense, it is a kind of management of the process of law in which media have the format of electronic files (text, pictures and audiovisual elements).

== The Brazilian phenomenon ==
(in Portuguese)

(in english)

== Public economy ==
The electronic process of law has been referred as recurrently as a necessary phenomenon to lower the costs of the public finances, dealing with direct mechanisms, as well as indirect ones like the consequences of the gains with accelerating the lawsuits. These waited cause-effect relation and the best form to achieve them are object of discussions in the Public powers and in the social networks.

== See also ==
- Lawsuit
- Judicial power
- Virtual world
- Audiovisual
