= Jus commune =

Aspects of the civil law system's invariant legal principles

Jus commune or ius commune is Latin for "common law" in certain jurisdictions. It is often used by civil law jurists to refer to those aspects of the civil law system's invariant legal principles, sometimes called "the law of the land" in English law. While the ius commune was a secure point of reference in continental European legal systems, in England it was not a point of reference at all. (Ius commune is distinct from the term "common law" meaning the Anglo-American family of law as opposed to the civil law family.) The phrase "the common law of the civil law systems" means those underlying laws that create a distinct legal system and are common to all its elements.

== Etymology ==
The ius commune, in its historical meaning, is commonly thought of as a combination of canon law and Roman law which formed the basis of a common system of legal thought in Western Europe from the rediscovery and reception of Justinian's Digest in the 12th and 13th centuries. In addition to this definition, the term also possibly had a narrower meaning depending upon the context in which it was used. Some scholars believe that the term, when used in the context of the ecclesiastical courts of England in the fourteenth and fifteenth century, also "meant the law that is common to the universal church, as opposed to the constitutions or special customs or privileges of any provincial church."

== Contents and history ==
The ius commune had a double basis: the Ancient Roman laws, as collected in Justinian's Corpus Juris Civilis, and the canon law of the Catholic Church, as initially collected in the 12th century in the Decretum Gratiani. While Justinian's collection remained unchanged throughout the medieval epoch, the canon law continued to be expanded and revised by various popes, reaching its final form, the Corpus Juris Canonici, in the 16th century. That "there were two highest laws, the canon and the civil" (Roman) law, remained a source of tension throughout the period in which the ius commune was influential.

While Justinian's laws themselves did not change, their understanding and interpretation developed throughout this period. From the 13th century on, the gloss of Accursius became especially relevant. Extended commentaries on Gratian's Decretum, known as summae, were similarly influential in regard to the interpretation of the canon law. The summa of Hostiensis became especially famous for "its concision, its completeness, and its 'golden' eloquence", which earned it the honorary name Summa aurea (Golden Summa).

The ius commune was an actual part of the law in most areas, although in any one jurisdiction local laws (statutes and customs) could take precedence over the ius commune. This was the case up until the codification movement in the late 18th and 19th centuries, which explicitly removed the direct applicability of Roman and canon law in most countries, although there continued to be argument about whether the ius commune was banished completely or survived where the national codes were silent.

The latter view prevailed, so it can still be said that there is, in theory at least, a common basis in substantive law throughout Western Europe (except England, which never had a reception as such) although it has of course fragmented greatly from its heyday in the 15th and 16th centuries. More important, however, is the civilian tradition of ways of thinking that the ius commune encouraged and the procedures it used, which have been more persistent than the actual substance.

== Influence in common law legal systems ==
In England, the law developed its own tradition separate from most of continental Europe based on its own common law. Scotland has a mixed civil and common law system. Scotland had a reception of Roman law and partial codification through the works of the Institutional Writers, such as Viscount Stair and Baron Hume, among others. Influence from England has meant that today Scotland's current system is considered more common law than "civilian", but besides terminological questions there are areas which are still heavily based on medieval Roman law, such as Scots property law.

== Bibliography ==
- Manlio Bellomo. The Common Legal Past of Europe, 1000-1800. Washington, DC: The Catholic University of America Press, 1995.
- John W. Cairns & Paul J. du Plessis. The creation of the ius commune: from Casus to Regula. Edinburgh: Edinburgh UP, 2010.
- Orazio Condorelli & Rafael Domingo, eds. Law and the Christian tradition in Italy: the legacy of the great jurists. Abingdon: Routledge, 2021.
- Tamar Herzog. A Short History of European Law: The Last Two and a Half Millennia. Cambridge, Mass.: Harvard University Press, 2018.
- David John Ibbetson, Common Law and Ius Commune. Selden Society, 2001 ISBN 978-0-85423-165-2
- Randall Lesaffer. European Legal History: A Cultural and Political Perspective. Trans. Jan Arriens. Cambridge: Cambridge University Press, 2009.
- George Mousourakis. “The Survival and Resurgence of Roman Law in Western Europe”, chap. 7 of Roman Law and the Origins of the Civil Law Tradition. Cham: Springer, 2015, pp. 233–86.
- Enrico Pattaro, ed. A Treatise of Legal Philosophy and General Jurisprudence. 12 vols. Dordrecht–London–NY: Springer, 2006–11.
  - Andrea Padovani & Peter Stein, eds. A Treatise of Legal Philosophy and General Jurisprudence, vol. 7: The Jurists’ Philosophy of Law from Rome to the Seventeenth Century. Dordrecht–London–NY: Springer, 2016.
  - Damiano Canala, Paolo Grossi, & Hasso Hofmann, eds. A Treatise of Legal Philosophy and General Jurisprudence, vol. 9: A History of the Philosophy of Law in the Civil Law World, 1600-1900. Dordrecht–London–NY: Springer, 2009.
- Heikki Pihlajamaki et al., eds. The Oxford Handbook of European Legal History. Oxford: Oxford University Press, 2018.
- O.F. Robinson et al. European Legal History: Sources and Institutions, 3rd edn. Oxford: Oxford University Press, 2005.
- Bart Wauters & Marco De Benito. The History of Law in Europe: An Introduction. Edward Elgar, 2017.
