= Murder of Mee Kuen Chong =

First British murderer to have their sentencing televised

Jemma Mitchell
- A composite image of Mitchell following her arrest (left) and her victim Mee Kuen Chong
- Born: 22 July 1984 (age 42); Australia
- Occupation: Former osteopath
- Status: Imprisoned
- Motive: Financial gain
- Conviction: Murder
- Penalty: Life imprisonment with a minimum of 34 years

Details
- Victims: Mee Kuen Chong
- Country: England
- Locations: Salcombe, Devon
- Date apprehended: 6 July 2021

Mee Kuen Chong was a Malaysian woman living in London, who was murdered in 2021 by Jemma Mitchell. Mitchell killed her friend Chong (known as Deborah) at the latter's home in Wembley, following a disagreement over the withdrawal of an offer of financial help to fund a property renovation. Mitchell put Chong's decapitated body in a suitcase and drove 200 miles (320 km) to Devon to dispose of it in woodland. The case is notable for being the first trial with a murder conviction in England and Wales to have its sentencing phase televised, and the first televised sentencing of a woman in the UK. At the sentencing hearing, which took place at the Old Bailey in London on 28 October 2022, Mitchell was sentenced by presiding judge Richard Marks KC to life imprisonment with a minimum term of 34 years.

== Background and murder ==
Jemma Mitchell, born 22 July 1984, grew up in Australia, where her mother worked for the UK's Foreign and Commonwealth Office. She moved to the UK with her mother and sister after her parents divorced.

She was educated at King Edward's School, Witley and in 2004 she attended King's College London to study a human sciences degree. The qualification included a course titled "Structural Basis of Human Functioning," during which she learnt to dissect the human body, and another module covering Experimental Anatomy. She demonstrated such skill during her study of the topic that she was awarded the Hamilton Prize for Anatomical Excellence, and graduated with First Class Honours. After studying osteopathy at the British School of Osteopathy she returned to Australia, where she set herself up as an osteopath.

She relocated back to the UK in 2015, but continued to own a property in Helensvale, Queensland. She did not work after 2015, as she was not registered with the General Osteopathic Council and therefore could not practise in the UK. Mitchell shared a house with her mother, who was retired, and her sister, in Willesden, North West London; the property was worth £4 million, but in a state of disrepair, and had been owned by the family for several generations. Mitchell is said to have had a turbulent relationship with her sister, and had a 2016 conviction for breaching a non-molestation order relating to her sister and brother-in-law. For this she was given a conditional discharge by North West London Magistrates' Court.

In or around August 2020, Mitchell met Mee Kuen Chong (known as Deborah) at a church they both attended, and the two women, described as "devout Christians," became friends. Chong, originally from Kuala Lumpur, Malaysia, had lived in London for 30 years. She was a widow, who suffered from paranoid schizophrenia, and was taking antipsychotic medication to manage the condition. She is said to have believed that Mitchell was "curing" her illness with spiritual healing, and that she was having a relationship with Prince Charles, with whom she believed she could communicate via YouTube. Prior to her death she had been exhibiting erratic behaviour, and was referred by the Fixated Threat Assessment Centre to her local community mental health team for sending letters to Prince Charles and Prime Minister Boris Johnson. Another friend, who attended church with Chong, described her as having a sweet and childlike nature.

Mitchell and her mother planned to make improvements to their property, adding another floor to the house, but were cheated out of £230,000 by two builders they had hired for the project. Chong agreed to give Mitchell £200,000, and the two exchanged numerous text messages on the subject. Chong, however, later withdrew the offer, and urged Mitchell to sell the house and "enjoy" the money instead. On the morning of 11 June 2021, Mitchell travelled to Chong's house in Wembley, north London, carrying a large blue suitcase. It is believed she then killed Chong and put her body in the suitcase, breaking Chong's ribs in the process, before taking the suitcase with her when she left the property several hours later. She also stole documents from Chong's house, and together with documents stolen from a recently deceased neighbour, she later attempted to use them to forge a will leaving the bulk of Chong's £700,000 estate to herself. Chong, who had last been seen alive on 10 June, was reported missing by her lodger on 11 June. When Mitchell was questioned by police as to Chong's whereabouts, she said Chong had gone to stay with family friends "somewhere close to the ocean", and that she had been feeling "depressed".

Mitchell stored the suitcase in the garden of the house she shared with her mother for two weeks. After reactivating her deceased neighbour's mobile phone, then using it to hire a car, on 26 June, she drove 200 miles (320 km) to Salcombe in Devon to dispose of the body, and dumped it on a woodland path near Bennett Road. The body, with the head missing, was found by holidaymakers the following day. A police search subsequently found the head four days later, around 10 metres (33 ft) away from the rest of the body. Chong's body was too badly decomposed to determine a cause of death, but a post mortem did ascertain that Chong had received a fracture to the skull.

== Arrest and trial ==
Mitchell was arrested on 6 July 2021, and subsequently charged with Chong's murder. During her custodial interrogation with the Metropolitan Police, she repeatedly told investigators, "No comment." She appeared at Willesden Magistrates' Court on 10 July, where she was remanded in custody pending a hearing at the Old Bailey. On 13 July 2021 she appeared via videolink from Bronzefield Prison, where a plea hearing was set for 28 September. She was further remanded until then by Judge Mark Lucraft QC. On 28 September Mitchell entered a plea of not guilty. Judge Anthony Leonard QC set a four-week trial for 2022, and another hearing for December, when Mitchell appeared again via videolink. At that hearing, held on 23 December, Lucraft set a trial date for 26 September 2022. However, the trial date was subsequently delayed until 11 October due to the strike action being staged by members of the Criminal Bar Association.

Proceedings took place in Courtroom 12 of the Old Bailey. The case was prosecuted by Deanna Heer KC, and defended by Richard Jory KC, while the trial was presided over by Judge Richard Marks KC.

The trial was told that Mitchell had practised as an osteopath for seven years, and that her professional website had described her as being "attuned to subjects in neuroanatomy, genetics and dissection of human cadavers". The court also heard that Chong had been killed after she changed her mind about putting the money into the house renovation scheme. Jurors were shown CCTV footage of Mitchell arriving at Chong's house with the blue suitcase shortly after 8.00 am on 11 June 2021, and emerging with it looking bulkier and heavier at around 1.13 pm. A second smaller bag was said to have contained documents stolen from the property. She was then captured walking through London with the bags for at least two hours, before being picked up by a taxi for the rest of her journey home. The trial was told that, later that evening, she attended St Thomas' Hospital in central London with a broken finger, which she claimed to have shut in a door.

The court also heard that the Volvo car Mitchell hired to transport the body to Devon blew a tyre during the journey, requiring her to pull into a Co-op garage near Salcombe and call for assistance, and that the AA repairman who came to her aid described her as being in a "confused" state of mind and the car as having an "old musty smell". He had also seen the suitcase in the boot, and found it strange that Mitchell wanted to keep the flat tyre. The court was further told that Chong's body was discovered at the bottom of a set of steps, and that along with the head, the first two bones that form the spine, as well as the larynx at the front of the neck were missing. A pathologist testified that injuries to her skull could have been sustained by either being pushed onto a protruding surface or by a weapon, but the trial heard that no weapon was found. The forged will was found by police during a search of Mitchell's home, and purported to leave 95% of Chong's estate to Mitchell "to be applied for the benefit of [Mitchell's] projects", with the remaining 5% to Mitchell's mother. The suitcase was discovered on the roof of a neighbour's shed, but the trial heard that while no DNA from Chong was found inside it, a bloodstained tea towel was discovered in the pocket.

Mitchell declined to give evidence in her defence, so a case for the defence was argued on her behalf. Her defence team asserted that there was no evidence to support the claim Chong's body had been stored in the suitcase due to the lack of DNA evidence, while there was also no evidence of a struggle at Chong's house. Heer countered that the broken finger Mitchell sustained while at the property was evidence of a struggle. Mitchell's defence further argued that the value of her property, estimated to be worth £4 million, together with £93,000 in personal savings, meant she did not have a financial motive to kill.

== Conviction and sentence ==
The jury was sent out to consider the case on 21 October 2022. Following seven hours of deliberation, on 27 October Mitchell was convicted of murder. Media reports described Mitchell as appearing passive as she heard the verdict. Following the verdict, it was reported that the sentencing phase of the trial would be televised, making Mitchell the first convicted murderer in England and Wales to be sentenced on live television, as well as the first woman in the UK to have her sentence filmed. The sentencing was the second to be filmed in England and Wales since a change in the law permitted television cameras into court, and to protect jurors and witnesses only the judge would be filmed.

The hearing took place at the Old Bailey on 28 October. A victim impact statement from Chong's sister, based in Malaysia, was read to the court, while she watched via videolink: "We still do not understand how she died. Did she suffer? This mystery will haunt me forever." During his sentencing statement, Judge Richard Marks KC described the aggravating factors in the case, notably that the killing had been carried out for financial gain, and the manner in which Mitchell had treated her victim's body: "I am driven to the conclusion that you are extremely devious", he told her. "There is the chilling aspect of what you did to and with her body after you killed her. You have shown absolutely no remorse and it appears you are in complete denial as to what you did, notwithstanding what in my judgment amounted to overwhelming evidence against you." He also addressed the matter of the crime's serious nature: "The enormity of your crime is profoundly shocking, even more so given your apparent religious devotion and the fact Deborah Chong was a good friend to you and had shown you great kindness." He then sentenced her to life imprisonment, with a minimum term of 34 years. This means she will not be eligible for parole until 21 October 2056.

Following Mitchell's conviction, her mother continued to maintain Mitchell's innocence, claiming the suitcase had not contained a body but "crockery, cutlery and tea towels" instead, and claimed that Mitchell would appeal against the conviction. In a subsequent media interview she claimed Mitchell was a "silly girl" who is "really, really bright" but "messed up", and that the police believed her to be the killer because "she washed the blue suitcase". On the day of her conviction, Detective Chief Inspector Jim Eastwood, who led the Metropolitan Police investigation into the case, said that Mitchell "has never accepted responsibility" for the murder, so there were some questions which remained unanswered: "Why she kept her body for a fortnight, why she decapitated her, why she deposited her remains in Salcombe".

== Documentary ==
The case was the subject of Body in the suitcase: The murder of Deborah Chong, a two-part documentary that aired on Crime & Investigation on 11 September 2023.

== See also ==
- Sentencing of Ben Oliver, a televised UK sentencing hearing from July 2022
- Murder of Jacqueline Montgomery, a UK murder trial that had its sentencing hearing televised
- List of solved missing person cases (2020s)
- Murder of Suzanne Pilley, a Scottish case from 2010 which had its sentencing hearing televised
- Courtroom photography and broadcasting
