= Courtroom photography and broadcasting =

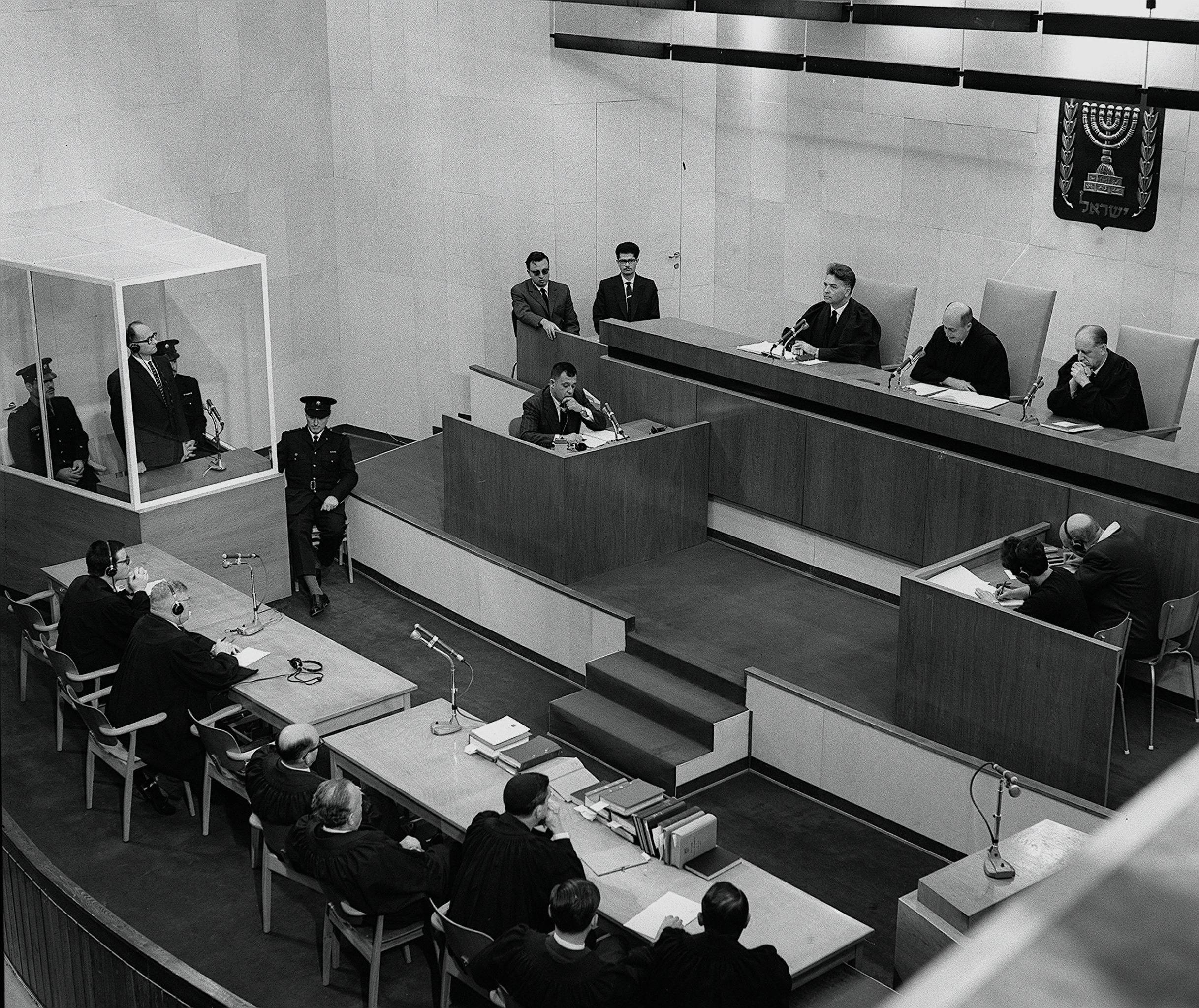
Adolf Eichmann is sentenced to death at the conclusion of the Eichmann Trial.

Courtroom photographing, videotaping and broadcasting is restricted in many jurisdictions. The law varies from limited film and electronic media coverage in some countries, to a complete ban in others.

== By country ==
=== United States ===
In the US, photography and broadcasting is permitted in some courtrooms but not in others. Some argue that use of media during courtroom proceedings presents a mockery of the judicial system, though the issue has been contested at length. There are concerns that the presentation and consideration of evidence may be affected by the presence of cameras influencing the behavior of court participants. Many famous trials, such as the O.J. Simpson murder trial, were televised. In the wake of the O.J. trial, however, many judges decided to ban cameras from their courtrooms. Immediately after that trial, California Governor Pete Wilson announced his opposition to televised trials, and he later asked the Judicial Council to consider reinstituting the ban on film and electronic media coverage of criminal trials. It has been argued, however, that the Simpson case was an anomaly that has little relation to the everyday concerns of media coverage of the criminal justice system.

Federal Rule of Criminal Procedure 53 states, "Except as otherwise provided by a statute or these rules, the court must not permit the taking of photographs in the courtroom during judicial proceedings or the broadcasting of judicial proceedings from the courtroom." However, some federal courtrooms experimented with cameras from 1991 to 1994. The courts have thus far been unwilling to overturn the ban on cameras, citing "concerns with expenditure of judicial time on administration and oversight of broadcasting; the necessity of sequestering juries so that they will not look at the television program of the trial itself; the difficulty in empaneling an impartial jury in the case of a retrial; the necessity of larger jury panels or increased use of marshals; the psychological effects on witnesses, jurors, lawyers, and judges; and related considerations of 'solemnity,' 'dignity,' and the like." In 1996, Justice David Souter said, "The day you see a camera come into our courtroom it’s going to roll over my dead body." U.S. Senator Arlen Specter has proposed televising U.S. Supreme Court proceedings. The Sunshine in the Courtroom Act, introduced by Charles Grassley, would "authorize the presiding judge of a U.S. appellate court or U.S. district court to permit the photographing, electronic recording, broadcasting, or televising to the public of court proceedings over which that judge presides." The Senate Judiciary Committee has recommended that it be considered by the Senate as a whole.

In 1965, the U.S. Supreme Court ruled, "The television industry, like other institutions, has a proper area of activities and limitations beyond which it cannot go with its cameras. That area does not extend into an American courtroom. On entering that hallowed sanctuary, where the lives, liberty and property of people are in jeopardy, television representatives have only the rights of the general public, namely, to be present, to observe the proceedings, and thereafter, if they choose, to report them." In the 1981 case Chandler v. Florida, the U.S. Supreme Court ruled that televising trials does not, per se, violate due process. Although the U.S. Constitution contains a public trial clause, it has been argued that the requirement of a public trial was created and satisfied when there were no broadcasters or telecasters and few newspapers. In some cases, jury deliberations have been publicly broadcast.

There have been two pilot programs that allowed cameras in civil proceedings in certain federal courts. Two appellate courts and six district courts participated in 1991–1994, and fourteen district courts participated in 2011–2015. As of 2023, the three district courts in the Ninth Circuit are continuing the pilot program. Recording requires the approval of the presiding judge and the consent of the parties.

Since 1955, the U.S. Supreme Court has made audio recordings of all its proceedings, which have been released more quickly over time. During the COVID-19 pandemic in the United States, the court started allowing the public to listen in real time.

=== United Kingdom ===
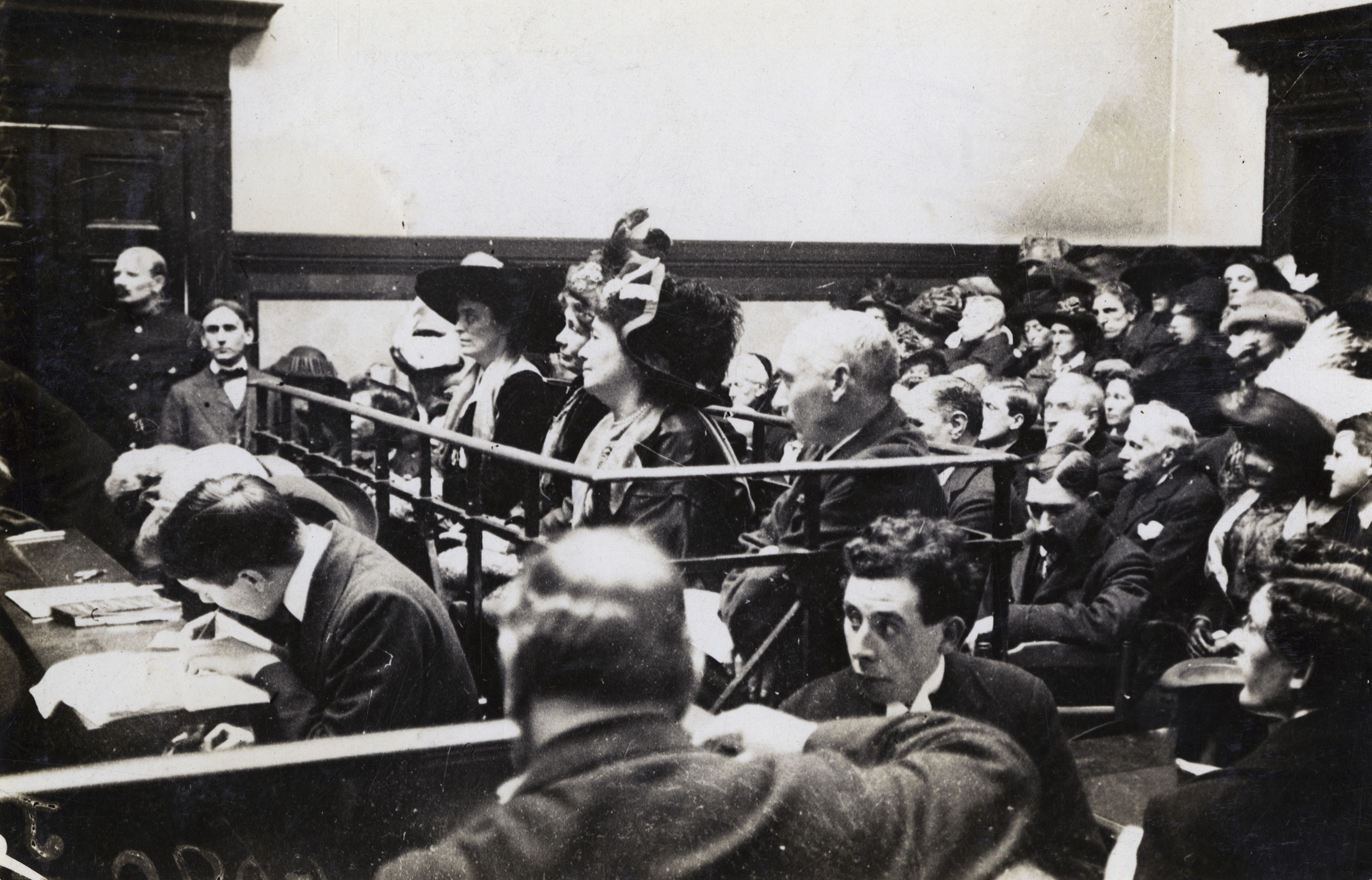
Emmeline Pankhurst in court in 1912

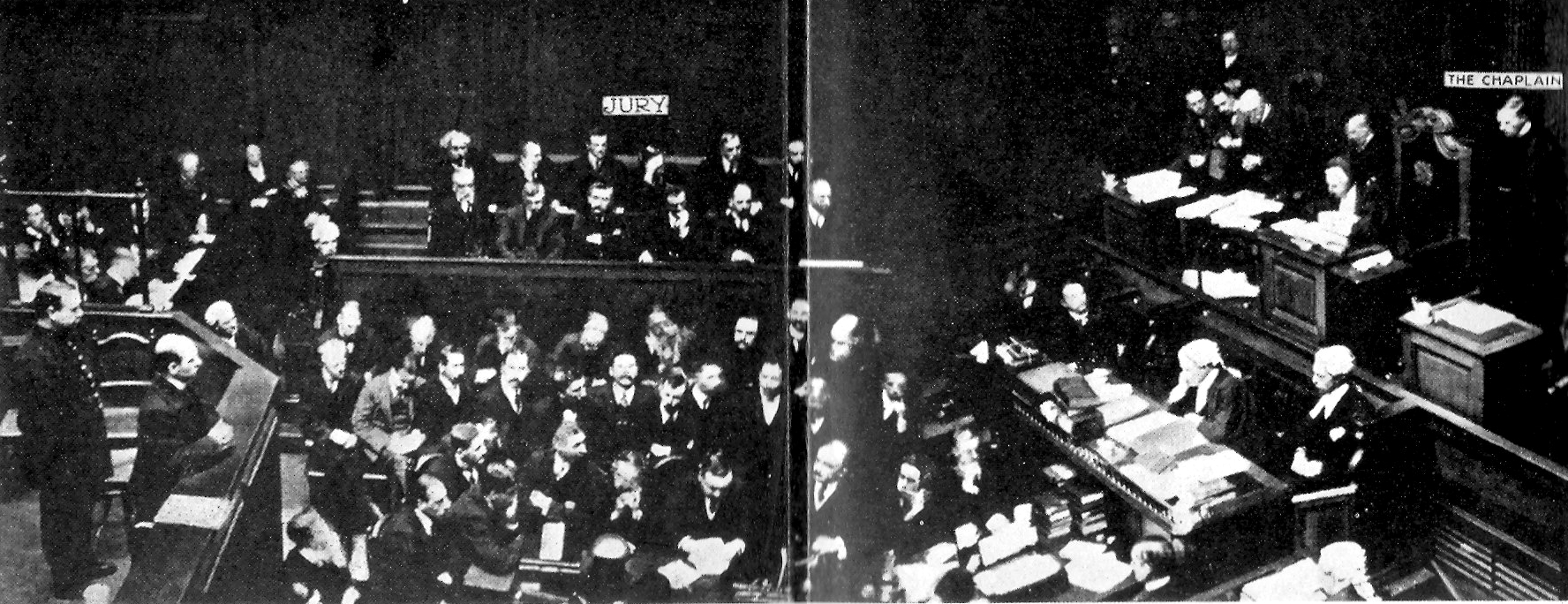
Frederick Seddon being sentenced to death in 1912 by Mr Justice Bucknill; the only known photograph of the death sentence being passed in an English court

Photography and broadcasting of a Crown Court case in the United Kingdom was illegal from 1925 until June 2020 per code 41 of the Criminal Justice Act and the Contempt of Court Act. In 2004, a small number of cases in the Court of Appeal were filmed in a trial basis. Other courts have begun to allow photography and filming in the early 21st century; the Supreme Court has permitted filming since 2009 while the Court of Appeal has allowed it on a regular basis since 2013. The second trial in 2012 for the Murder of Arlene Fraser in the High Court of Justiciary was later broadcast on Channel 4.

In June 2020, the Crown Court (Recording and Broadcasting) Order 2020 was passed. According to the Ministry of Justice, filming in the Crown Court is expected to commence as soon as practicable after recovery from COVID-19 disruption. Only the judge will be filmed, recording only sentencing remarks in serious high-profile criminal cases, as was the case with the sentencing of Ben Oliver in July 2022.

Russell Causley, who was convicted of the murder of his first wife Carole, may be the first person to have a public parole hearing in October 2022.

Some disadvantages of televised trials, from the point of view of the media, are that the proceedings are static visually, consume large amounts of TV crew time, and are sometimes difficult for the viewers to understand.

=== Australia ===
The High Court of Australia has started allowing video recordings of Full Court proceedings, since 1 October 2013. In its press release explaining this step, the High Court made the point that "[its] decision to take these steps was made having regard to the nature of its jurisdiction and is not intended to set any precedent for other courts". The High Court of Australia is the highest court in the Australian judicial system.

=== Ukraine ===
Since 2014, Ukraine has allowed videotaping of court sessions without obtaining the specific permission of the judge, within the limitations established by law. In 2015 the Open Court Project launched with the aim of videotaping court proceedings in civil, commercial, administrative cases. The Open Court Project has videotaped over 7000 court cases in courts at different levels. The videos are stored, indexed and published in the public domain.

In 2017 NGO Open Ukraine has launched the VR Court Project aimed at videotaping court sessions with 3D 360 degree portable video cameras to create VR video records of court sessions.

=== Brazil ===
In Brazil, each court decides if a court session can be photographed or broadcast. The Brazilian Supreme Federal Court and Superior Electoral Court broadcasts all its proceedings in real time since 2002 by its TV channel TV Justiça, as well on its YouTube channel. Many Brazilian state courts also allow their sessions to be broadcast.

== Controversy ==
Daniel M. Kolkey argues that televising trials can distort the truth-seeking process of a criminal trial and chill witnesses' willingness to cooperate; that televising trials interferes with the privacy of victims, witnesses and defendants; that the decision whether to televise trials does not lend itself to a case-by-case determination; and that televising trials can transform them into a form of entertainment which can undermine the dignity of, and respect for, our judicial institutions. Bryan Goebel counter-argues that there is no evidence to support claims that cameras have any greater psychological effect than a packed courtroom of strangers or that the cameras undermine truthful testimony. It has been pointed out that inasmuch as no trial can be reproduced in laboratory conditions, scientific experimentation is not possible, and we thus have no empirical data on the effect of television on a criminal trial.

It has been argued that because the majority of Americans have had no personal experience with the legal system, and because the majority of Americans get their information about the world solely from television, the portrayal of justice on television is extremely important to the continued viability of the legal system and to the individual's understanding of that system. Senator Charles Schumer argued, "Courts are an important part of our government, and the more our government institutions are shown to the public, the more dignified they become, and the more the public comes to understand them. Allowing cameras into our courtrooms will help demystify them and let the public evaluate how well the system works." Justice Otto Moore of the Colorado Supreme Court opined in 1956, "Do we hear complaints that the employment of these modern devices of thought transmission in the pulpits of our great churches destroys the dignity of the service; that they degrade the pulpit or create misconceptions in the mind of the public? The answers are obvious. That which is carried out with dignity will not become undignified because more people may be permitted to see and hear." William O. Douglas argued that televising trials should not be allowed because the press can use it to pressure judges to decide a case a certain way, particularly in jurisdictions where judges are elected.

In reference to the argument that cameras make witnesses nervous, former jurist Louis Gohmert stated, "I think nervousness is a good thing in a witness. It makes potential inaccuracies come to the light and easier to observe." He responded to the argument that cameras may make witnesses more reluctant to testify by saying, "There is a thing called a subpoena," and noting that he "found that if people are not willing to come to court and they are reluctant to testify, officers with handcuffs and guns are very helpful."

== See also ==
- Court of public opinion
- Courtroom sketch
- In open court
- Open justice
- Public trial
- Secret trial
- Sunshine in the Courtroom Act
- Cameras in the Supreme Court of the United States
- Trial by media
- List of courts which publish audio or video of arguments
