= Murder of Jacqueline Montgomery =

English 1975 child murder

- Victim Jacqueline Montgomery
- Location: Islington, North London, United Kingdom
- Date: 1 June 1975; 51 years ago
- Attack type: Child murder by stabbing, strangling, torture murder, child rape
- Victims: Jacqueline Montgomery, aged 15
- Perpetrator: Dennis McGrory
- Motive: Rage, sexual gratification
- Verdict: Not guilty (first trial); Guilty on both counts (retrial)
- Convictions: Murder, rape
- Sentence: Life imprisonment with the possibility of parole after 25 years and 126 days

The murder of Jacqueline Montgomery, a 15-year-old girl from Islington, North London, United Kingdom, occurred on 1 June 1975. She was murdered by Dennis McGrory, her aunt's 28-year-old estranged partner, who was described at his trial as being "wild with rage" when he sexually assaulted, stabbed, and strangled Montgomery at her family home in Offord Road.

Her body was discovered by her father in the early hours of 2 June on the floor of the living room of their house. McGrory was tried on circumstantial evidence in 1976, but cleared of murder. He faced trial again in 2022 under the rule of double jeopardy after swabs taken at the time of the murder were tested for his DNA and found to be a one-in-a-billion match. Following the second trial, McGrory was convicted of Montgomery's rape and murder at the Old Bailey in December 2022. His sentencing took place at Huntingdon Crown Court on 13 January 2023, at which presiding judge, Simon Bryan, sentenced McGrory to life imprisonment with a minimum of 25 years and 126 days. McGrory will be eligible for parole when he is 100 years old.

With 47 years having passed since the 1975 murder, the case represents the longest lapse of time between a murder and a conviction in England and Wales as a result of double jeopardy.

== Background ==
In 1975, Jacqueline Montgomery was a 15-year-old girl living with her father in Islington, North London, her mother having recently left the family to live in a nearby flat. Her aunt, Josie Montgomery, had lived with Dennis McGrory, who has been described as violent and abusive. At the time of the murder, she had left him and was attempting to establish a life for herself away from him. In a diary she kept, Jacqueline Montgomery described a trip she made with her aunt to Manchester in an attempt to escape her partner. At his sentencing hearing, McGrory was described as having had an "unreciprocated sexual interest" in the teenager, and had "tried it on" with her before the day of her murder.

Some time between 1 and 2 June 1975, it is believed that after a period of drinking heavily, McGrory, then aged 28, went to Montgomery's house in Offord Road, Islington, looking for Josie. Jacqueline Montgomery was alone at the house, and it is thought that he attacked her in an attempt to force her to reveal Josie's whereabouts. During the attack, Montgomery was raped, and stabbed through the back, heart and diaphragm. She was also strangled with the electric cord of an iron, which was found around her neck. Her body was discovered on the floor of the lounge of the house when her father, Robert Montgomery, returned home in the early hours of 2 June.

The phone was found off the hook, suggesting Montgomery had attempted to call for help during the struggle, and detectives later established the phoneline had been engaged since the late morning of 1 June, suggesting the murder had taken place on that date. McGrory would later arrive at the home of one of Montgomery's neighbours in a shaken and excitable state. He waved a piece of paper which he claimed contained Josie Montgomery's address, and said that he had been assaulted by four "geezers". McGrory was arrested on suspicion of murder, but claimed not to have seen Montgomery that day. He told police that injuries sustained to his face had come about after he was attacked by four men. The slip of paper bearing the aunt's address, which turned out to be false, placed him at the scene, and on 10 July 1975, he was charged with Montgomery's murder. But a trial at the Old Bailey, held in 1976, collapsed after the presiding judge rejected the circumstantial nature of its evidence linking him to the crime.

== Double jeopardy and retrial ==
Following a 2003 change in the law regarding the rule of double jeopardy, the principle by which a person cannot be tried twice for the same crime, it became possible for a murder suspect to be retried if new and compelling evidence were to emerge, and the Director of Public Prosecutions deemed it to be in the public interest. Since then it has only been used on rare occasions, most notably in the case of Gary Dobson who, in 2012, was one of two people convicted of the 1993 murder of Stephen Lawrence, Dobson having previously faced trial and been cleared of that crime. In 2021, it was also used to successfully convict Gary Allen, who had been cleared two decades earlier of the 1997 murder of Samantha Class, and consequently went on to commit a second murder.

Following a request from Montgomery's family that the case be reviewed, in November 2015 it was re-examined by the Metropolitan Police's Specialist Casework Team, and was referred to the Crown Prosecution Service Appeals and Review Unit. Detectives discovered that scientists involved in the original investigation had taken and preserved vaginal swabs from the body, carefully labelling this evidence. These were tested against McGrory's DNA, and found to be a one-in-a-billion match. The case was sent to the Court of Appeal, where the acquittal was quashed, and on 3 March 2020, McGrory, by then living in Newport Pagnell, Milton Keynes, Buckinghamshire, was rearrested and once again charged with Montgomery's rape and murder. McGrory's trial began at the Old Bailey on 3 March 2022, but had to be halted on 16 March when he fell ill. It was rescheduled for 30 November, with a fresh jury at Huntingdon Crown Court.

The case was prosecuted by Tom Little KC and Sarah Przybylska, and defended by William Boyce KC. The presiding judge was Mr Justice Bryan. McGrory appeared in court via videolink from the office of his solicitor, and pleaded "not guilty" to the charges. The court heard that he was a violent bully, who had previously threatened to rape Montgomery prior to the occasion of her murder, and that he was "wild with rage" when he went looking for Josie Montgomery and attacked her niece. It was said he most likely "took his anger and frustration out" on Montgomery as a result of not finding Josie at the house. The trial was told that a burn mark on Montgomery's leg, along with the presence of the electric cord, suggested she may have been tortured by McGrory in order to reveal her aunt's location. A page from the teenager's diary containing Josie's address was also torn from the book by McGrory, and found in his pocket at the time of his original arrest. The DNA evidence placed him at the scene, and proved there had been sexual contact between McGrory and Montgomery. The court also heard that the injuries to McGrory's face were caused as Montgomery tried to defend herself, and that despite the severity of her injuries she may have lived for around ten minutes after the attack.

Following the two week trial, the jury was sent out on 19 December, and convicted McGrory of both the rape and murder of Jacqueline Montgomery, and a sentencing hearing was set for 13 January 2023. McGrory, who was ordered to court to hear the verdict, was remanded in custody until then. Speaking after the conviction, Montgomery's sister, Kathy, said: "The investigation of the last few years has meant revisiting memories of the murder which has caused pain and stress for me and my family and I am relieved that we finally have justice for Jackie."

Max Hill KC, the Director of Public Prosecutions for England and Wales, commented on the unusual nature of the conviction: "It is extremely rare for an acquittal to be overturned but after careful consideration I was satisfied there was new clear and compelling evidence to allow an application to be made to the Court of Appeal. It is very rarely that I have approved such an application and I am extremely satisfied to see today's verdict. My thoughts are with everybody who still mourns Jacqueline."

== Sentencing ==
The sentencing hearing, also held at Huntingdon Crown Court, took place on 13 January 2023, and was one of a small number of such hearings in England and Wales to have been televised since 2022. Presiding judge, Mr Justice Bryan, sentenced McGrory to life imprisonment with a minimum term of 25 years and 126 days. In his sentencing summary he said: "I have no doubt whatsoever that you intended to kill her in your brutal attack on her. You put Jacqui through a horrific, violent and sustained ordeal in her own home – a place where she was entitled to feel safe. In the decades that followed, you must have thought you had gotten away with your hideous crimes. How any man could inflict such sexual violence on a 15-year-old child that had done them no harm beggars belief." McGrory will be eligible for parole on 12 May 2048. The length of the sentence, together with McGrory's age at the time of his conviction (he was 75), means he will likely spend the rest of his life in prison.

Speaking after the hearing, forensic scientist Lee Shufflebottom, whose work had helped to secure the conviction, praised the foresight of the original forensics team, who had preserved and retained "those parts of the exhibits for future new technologies to come around, to be able to find that evidence that crucially they couldn't find in 1975".

With 47 years having passed since the 1975 murder, the case represents the longest lapse of time between a murder and a conviction in England and Wales as a result of double jeopardy.

== See also ==
- Jemma Mitchell case, a 2022 murder trial which had its sentencing phase televised
- Sentencing of Ben Oliver, another case from 2022 which had its sentencing phase filmed
