= Murder of Suzanne Pilley =

Murder of a British woman

Suzanne Pilley
- Born: 1972
- Died: May 2010 (aged 37–38); Scotland
- Occupation: Bookkeeper
- Employer: Infrastructure Managers Ltd
- Known for: Murder victim
- Parent(s): Rob and Sylvia Pilley

Suzanne Pilley (1972 – May 2010) was a 38-year-old British bookkeeper from Edinburgh, Scotland, who went missing on the morning of 4 May 2010. Following a highly publicised appeal for information on her whereabouts and intensive police enquiries, her former lover, David Gilroy, was arrested and charged with her murder. He was found guilty by majority verdict on 15 March 2012 and sentenced to life imprisonment. The judge ordered him to serve a minimum of 18 years in prison. The case is controversial because the prosecution obtained a murder conviction without a body. The body of Suzanne Pilley has never been found.

== Background and disappearance ==
On 4 May 2010, Suzanne Pilley was making her way to the offices of Infrastructure Managers Ltd in Thistle Street, Edinburgh, where she worked as a bookkeeper. As part of her routine, she would often call into the St Andrew Square branch of Sainsbury's on the way to work. At 08:51, she was seen on CCTV leaving Sainsbury's; at 08:54, she was seen on CCTV on North St David Street, about to turn into Thistle Street. This was to be the last public sighting of her; she failed to turn up for work.

On the afternoon of 4 May 2010 she was reported missing to Lothian and Borders Police by her parents Robert and Sylvia Pilley.

On 11 May 2010, the police started a high-profile public appeal for information, using screens erected in the centre of Edinburgh, playing footage of Pilley's last known whereabouts.

On 18 May 2010, Pilley's employers issued a statement saying that her disappearance 'was completely out of character'. The following day, police issued a statement saying that they were now treating the enquiry as a murder investigation.

On 20 May 2010, it was reported in the press that police had expanded their investigation to a 400-square-mile (1,000-square-kilometre) area of Argyll, stretching from Tyndrum to Inveraray and the Argyll Forest. It was said that they were keen to trace the movements of a silver vehicle driven by a man on remote roads across Argyll and Bute on the afternoon of 5 May 2010.

On 23 June 2010, David Gilroy, a colleague and former boyfriend of Pilley's, was detained by Lothian and Borders Police under section 14 of the Criminal Procedure (Scotland) Act 1995 in connection with her disappearance. Later that day he was arrested and charged with her murder.

On 24 June 2010, Gilroy appeared on petition, in private at Edinburgh Sheriff Court, charged with the murder of Suzanne Pilley and various other offences relating to her disappearance. He made no plea or declaration. A petition for bail was lodged and granted by Sheriff Deirdre MacNeill. On 1 July 2010, Gilroy appeared on petition, in private at Edinburgh Sheriff Court for judicial examination. Thereafter he was fully committed for trial. A second petition for bail was lodged and granted by Sheriff Nigel Morrison.

== HM Advocate v Gilroy ==
HM Advocate v Gilroy
- Court: High Court of Justiciary
- Full case name: Her Majesty's Advocate v David Gilroy
- Decided: 15 March 2012

Court membership
- Judge sitting: Lord Bracadale

On 20 February 2012 the trial of David Gilroy began at the High Court of Justiciary, sitting in Court 11 at Edinburgh Sheriff Court. (Note: It is common practice for the Edinburgh Sheriff Court buildings to accommodate High Court of Justiciary trials which are listed for extended periods.) The presiding judge was Lord Bracadale. The prosecution was led by advocate depute Alex Prentice, and the defence by Jack Davidson. David Gilroy's solicitor was Jim Wardlaw.

The indictment ran to 5 pages. The principal charges libelled were that:

- On 4 May 2010, Gilroy killed Pilley at the offices of Infrastructure Managers Ltd, in Thistle Street, Edinburgh, or elsewhere, by means to the prosecutor unknown.
- Gilroy concealed Pilley's corpse in the Thistle Street premises of Infrastructure Managers Ltd, transported it to Argyll in the boot of a car, and various locations around Scotland, and thereafter disposed of it by means to the prosecutor unknown.

The jury of eight men and seven women began hearing evidence on the afternoon of 20 February 2012. The trial lasted 24 days.

=== Prosecution case ===
The first witness for the Crown was Suzanne Pilley's mother, Sylvia Pilley. She spoke to the fact that her daughter had had a 'turbulent on-off relationship' with David Gilroy, and that she had previously cohabited with him on a temporary basis.

On 23 February 2012, the advocate depute led evidence from a Lothian and Borders Police constable who told the court that they had enlisted the help of specially trained cadaver dogs from South Yorkshire Police to search the offices where David Gilroy and Suzanne Pilley worked. The dogs were specially trained to smell for blood and human remains. The court was told that the dogs, springer spaniels, had identified three areas of interest; one in the basement area of the offices, and two in the boot of David Gilroy's silver Vauxhall Vectra.

On 24 February 2012, the court heard from a forensic imagery expert, Jacqueline Butterwick, who had analysed footage on behalf of the police. She told the court that the CCTV footage of a person on Thistle Street bore enough similarities to other CCTV images of Suzanne Pilley taken that day, for her to say that it definitely was Pilley. She was 20 metres from the entrance to her work.

On 27 February 2012 Andrea Gilroy, David Gilroy's wife, was cited as a witness by the Crown. As she entered the witness box, the trial judge Lord Bracadale explained that she had the right not to give evidence against her husband if she did not wish. She declined to give evidence. Mrs Gilroy could only decline to give evidence because the events she would speak to took place before section 86 of the Criminal Justice and Licensing (Scotland) Act 2010 came into force. This act amended the law such that spouses and civil partners of an accused person in Scotland, are competent and compellable witnesses for the prosecution.

On 1 March 2012, the advocate depute led evidence from Sgt Paul Grainger of Lothian and Borders Police. He spoke to the contents of an 11-hour interview which Gilroy gave to police on 6 May 2010. Grainger told the court that during the interview he noticed a scar on Gilroy's forehead under his hairline and that there had been some sort of scratch on his chin. The court also heard that Gilroy had told police, that on the evening of 2 May 2010 he and Pilley had decided to split up and then took part in a Buddhist-style religious ceremony, writing their feelings down on pieces of paper and burning them.

On 6 March 2012, the court heard from a forensic scientist, Kirsty McTurk, who told the trial that she had conducted a search for DNA in Pilley's workplace and in the boot of Gilroy's car. She confirmed that she had been unable to find any trace of Pilley's DNA anywhere in the building or in the car. She told the court that as she opened the boot to Gilroy's car, she noticed a fresh smell coming from inside. She told the advocate depute that it could either have been an 'air freshener' or a 'cleansing agent'.

The court later heard from a friend of Suzanne Pilley's, Gayle Hawkins, who spoke to the fact that Suzanne had previously told people she was worried that Gilroy was hacking into her email account. Alex Prentice produced in court phone records showing that Gilroy was in contact with Pilley almost daily before her disappearance, but that his contact had stopped the day before she went missing. It was revealed that Gilroy would regularly text Pilley more than 50 times a day. The last contact between their phones was on 3 May 2010 when he left 15 text messages and one voicemail.

On 7 March 2012, a forensic pathologist, Nathaniel Cary told the jury that Gilroy had curved scratches on his hands, a cut on his forehead, bruises on his chest and other scratches to his hands, wrist, and forearms on 6 May 2010. A series of photographs were produced in court (left). He told the advocate depute that the scratches could have been caused by another person's fingernails, possibly in a struggle, and that this had happened around the time Pilley went missing. He also said that the injuries were consistent with what he had seen previously in cases involving strangulation, but that it was difficult to tell because the injuries had been covered with a make-up like substance. Under cross-examination Cary confirmed that the scratches on Gilroy's hands could have come from gardening activities.

On 8 March 2012, the advocate depute led evidence from a Lothian and Borders Police constable who told the court how they partially traced a car journey Gilroy made to Lochgilphead on 5 May 2010, using CCTV footage. After analysing the footage police recreated the journey there and back several times. They found that Gilroy had taken two hours longer than their average time each way. Furthermore, a comparison of fuel consumption suggested that 124 miles (200 kilometres) of Gilroy's journey were unaccounted for.

This concluded the evidence for the prosecution. On 9 March 2012 the Crown withdrew a number of charges on the indictment relating to an assault, a breach of the peace and a contravention of the Computer Misuse Act 1990. Charges 6 and 7 on the indictment, murder and attempting to defeat the ends of justice, respectively, remained.

=== Defence case ===
The defence case began on the morning of 12 March 2012 and lasted half a day. The court heard from a number of witnesses who worked in the offices of Infrastructure Managers Ltd, who spoke to the fact that they did not see anything out of the ordinary at the premises in Thistle Street on 4 May 2010. Gilroy declined to give evidence in his own defence.

=== Closing speeches and verdict ===
On the afternoon of 12 March 2012, advocate depute Alex Prentice began addressing the jury. He told them that the Crown case was that Gilroy had killed Pilley in the basement of her office before hiding her body in a recess. That Gilroy had then brought his car from home and put Pilley's body in the boot and the next day transported her to a "lonely grave" somewhere in Argyll. He pointed to a "sudden interruption" in Pilley's life since she had vanished. In particular, he highlighted that she had made no contact with anyone, there had been no activity on her credit cards and she had not made any arrangements for her pet fish and cat. It was also said that the lack of calls and texts from Gilroy after Pilley went missing suggested he knew she was already dead and that he had her phone. The advocate depute also reminded the jury that Gilroy had gone on a journey of "no importance" the day after she had disappeared instead of "assisting the police inquiry".

On the morning of 13 March 2012, Jack Davidson began summing up the case for the defence. He urged the ladies and gentleman of the jury to assess the evidence 'dispassionately', and said that it would be unsafe to convict David Gilroy of murder because the case the Crown presented was a circumstantial one.

On the afternoon of 13 March 2012 the jury of eight men and seven women were sent out to consider their verdict. After two and a half days of deliberations, on 15 March 2012 David Gilroy was found guilty by majority verdict of the murder of Suzanne Pilley and of attempting to defeat the ends of justice. (Note: Verdicts in Scotland are reached by a simple majority vote of the jury. The number of votes for each verdict is never disclosed to the court. See Trial by jury in Scotland.)

=== Filming of sentencing diet ===
On 15 March 2012 following the guilty verdict, Lord Bracadale adjourned the diet for background reports and remanded David Gilroy in custody.

Given the high level of public interest in the outcome of the trial, Scottish broadcaster STV wrote to the then Lord Justice General, Lord Hamilton, requesting permission to film the sentencing of Gilroy. On 10 April 2012, it was announced that the sentencing diet would be filmed by a camera crew from STV and the footage made freely available to broadcasters for use on the same day. Strict conditions were placed on what could be filmed. The Lord Justice General stipulated that the camera should focus solely on the trial judge and court staff and that Gilroy himself could not be filmed. In addition, it was reported that filming would only commence after Jack Davidson had finished delivering his plea in mitigation.

The decision to allow filming of the sentencing attracted widespread attention and comment in both the Scottish and national press. Although the case marked the first time that cameras would be allowed to film the sentencing of a convicted person in the UK for same day broadcast, it was not the first time that cameras had been allowed to film criminal proceedings in a Scottish court.

Scottish courts have a long history of televising high-profile and important cases, since unlike in England and Wales, photography and filming are not excluded by statute.

On 13 April 2012 it was announced that journalists attending the sentencing of Gilroy would be allowed to use live-text based communication services such as Twitter to document events as they happened. This marked only the second time that permission to use Twitter in a Scottish court had been granted. The first occasion was the sentencing diet in HMA v Sheridan and Sheridan. Unlike in England and Wales where the use of Twitter and related services is unrestricted in court, in Scotland, permission needs to be sought from both the trial judge and the Lord Justice General on a case-by-case basis. The granting of such permission is rare.

On 18 April 2012 at 9.30 am in court 3 at the High Court of Justiciary in Edinburgh, Lord Bracadale sentenced David Gilroy to life imprisonment with a punishment part of 18 years, for the murder of Suzanne Pilley and for attempting to defeat the ends of justice. A single camera, a cameraman, and an audio technician from STV were present in court.

Following the sentencing diet, the recorded footage was analysed by staff from the Scottish Court Service and cleared for broadcast at 11.00 am. Edited versions of the footage were shown on various national news programmes that day. In addition, various national and international news websites made a 'standardised' 4-minute 40-second video of the proceedings available for viewing online.

On the evening of 18 April 2012, the website of The Scotsman newspaper made available an extended 6-minute 23-second video of the proceedings. The extended video comprises visual footage from the standardised 4 minute 40-second video but a different audio track. The extended audio track comprises 66 seconds of Jack Davidson's plea in mitigation. It was previously stated in the press that this would not be filmed.

=== Appeal ===
David Gilroy continues to maintain his innocence. On 27 April 2012, he lodged an intimation of his intention to appeal against conviction, under section 109(1) of the Criminal Procedure (Scotland) Act 1995, with the Clerk of Justiciary. The appeal was unanimously rejected by the Court of Criminal Appeal in Edinburgh on 20 December 2012. In 2013 his lawyers attempted to have his case reviewed by the UK Supreme Court, arguing the police had acted illegally, however their arguments were rejected by all three judges. In June 2017 the Scottish Criminal Cases Review Commission closed their review of the case. Shortly after this, the Crown Office and Procurator Fiscal Service announced that evidence from the case would be removed from storage and destroyed. Gilroy's family argued this would make it difficult for him to overturn his conviction, however a spokesperson for the COPFS defended the decision, stating: “David Gilroy was convicted of murder and his appeal and application to the Scottish Criminal Cases Review Commission were unsuccessful. As such there is no legal basis for COPFS to retain the productions relating to this case.” The police subsequently announced that Gilroy's car, believed to be used to transport Suzanne Pilley's corpse, would be auctioned.

== Aftermath ==
Despite extensive searches during the police investigation and after the trial, the body of Suzanne Pilley has never been found. Her remains are believed to be buried in a forest somewhere in Argyll.

Initially, David Gilroy was sent to HMP Edinburgh. The prison is not normally used to house prisoners who are serving life sentences, but Gilroy declined to be segregated from the general prison population. Gilroy was moved to HMP Shotts following threats from fellow prisoners at HMP Edinburgh. It was later reported that Gilroy had been attacked on his first day at HMP Shotts by fellow inmates and conveyed to hospital with a broken jaw after telling other prisoners that he would be released on appeal.

In 2018, Robbie Coltrane's Critical Evidence covered the case.

In 2019, Audible released a podcast on the case and Gilroy's appeals.

In 2022, new Scottish parole rules were introduced, which mean Gilroy could be denied parole if he refuses to disclose where he hid Suzanne Pilley's body. In 2025, a new bill, informally known as 'Suzanne's law', was proposed by the Scottish Government, which would mean failure to reveal her whereabouts must be taken into account by a parole board (under the current rules it is something they may take into account). In 2026 these new rules came into force.

In 2024, Crimewatch made a fresh appeal for information concerning the location of Suzanne's body.

== See also ==
- HMA v Fraser (2012)
- Lists of solved missing person cases
- Sentencing of Ben Oliver
- Jemma Mitchell case
