= Alex Prentice =

Scottish lawyer

Alex Prentice KC
- Occupations: Solicitor Advocate; Advocate Depute
- Years active: 1983-present
- Employer: Crown Office and Procurator Fiscal Service

Alexander "Alex" Prentice KC is a leading Scottish lawyer who is widely regarded as the country's most experienced prosecutor.

He has held senior posts at the Crown Office and Procurator Fiscal Service, the body which normally carries out prosecutions in Scotland. He became an assistant Principal Advocate Depute in 2009, and then the Principal Advocate Depute. After the office restructured in 2011, he became the senior crown counsel.

Prentice qualified as a solicitor in 1983 and as a Solicitor Advocate in 1994, and practised as a defence solicitor for 21 years. In 2004 he became the first Solicitor Advocate from outside the Crown Office and Procurator Fiscal Service to be appointed as an Advocate Depute. He was appointed as a Senior Advocate Depute in 2006 and became a QC in 2007.

Prentice has prosecuted a number of significant cases including the shotgun murder at the "Marmion" public house in Edinburgh, the murder of Jolanta Bledaite, HM Advocate v Sheridan and Sheridan, the Murder of Surjit Singh Chhokar, and HM Advocate v Salmond. In 2012 he twice won a murder conviction without a body in the murder of Suzanne Pilley and the retrial in the murder of Arlene Fraser. Further to this, Prentice won an appeal lodged by Fraser in 2013. In June 2013, Channel 4 screened Nat Fraser's second trial in The Murder Trial, which heavily featured Prentice himself. In 2022 Prentice successfully prosecuted another bodyless murder case, the murder of Renee and Andrew MacRae, which was filmed for the BBC documentary Murder Trial: A Dangerous Affair. The following year Prentice featured in another BBC Murder Trial documentary, entitled A Deadly Obsession, which chronicled his successful prosecution of Christopher Harrisson for the murder of Brenda Page.

In 2024 he featured in The Push, a Channel 4 documentary about the trial of Kashif Anwar, who murdered his wife Fawziyah Javed by pushing her from Arthur's Seat in Edinburgh, in which he prosecuted. In 2025 he featured in Murder Trial: Girl in the River, a BBC documentary about another trial where he prosecuted, the murder of Caroline Glachan.

In 2026 he successfully prosecuted Lee Milne for his role in the suicide of Kimberly Milne, the first time in Scotland that a person was convicted of culpable homicide for driving another to suicide.
