= Sunshine in the Courtroom Act =

The Sunshine in the Courtroom Act is a bill to allow the broadcasting of U.S. District Court and U.S. Court of Appeals proceedings. The name of the bill is an apparent reference to Louis Brandeis' remark that "sunshine is the best disinfectant" for ill-doings. The proposed act relates to Federal Rule of Criminal Procedure 53, which states, "Except as otherwise provided by a statute or these rules, the court must not permit the taking of photographs in the courtroom during judicial proceedings or the broadcasting of judicial proceedings from the courtroom."

The bill was introduced in 2005 (S. 829), 2007, 2008, 2009, 2011, 2013, 2015, 2017, and 2019. The 2009 bill was approved by the Senate Judiciary Committee. The Senate version is S. 657, and the House version is H.R.3054. In 2009, the Judicial Council of the 9th Circuit expressed interest in televising certain proceedings.

In Congressional testimony, Ted Poe stated:

When I was Assistant District Attorney, I spent my career trying criminal cases, and based on my experiences, I actually feel the cameras in the courtroom benefit a defendant. A public trial ensures fairness. That is the purpose of a public trial. It ensures professionalism by the lawyers and the judge, and a camera in the courtroom protects the defendant’s right to a public trial.

Poe also opined that lawyers play to the jury, not to the camera, and that jurors stated they liked the camera inside the courtroom because they wanted the public to know what they heard "instead of waiting to hear a 30-second sound bite from a newscaster who may or may not have the facts correct." Judge John R. Tunheim opposed the bill, stating that it could deny some defendants a fair trial; e.g. a defendant corporation might forgo its right to a trial because it does not want its president to be cross-examined on television. He also expressed concern that televising trials could increase the incidence of threats against federal judges.

Short name	Congressional session	Specific bills
Sunshine in the Courtroom Act	105th	H.R. 1280
Sunshine in the Courtroom Act of 2005	109th	S. 829
Sunshine in the Courtroom Act of 2008	110th	S. 352
Sunshine in the Courtroom Act of 2009	111th	S. 657
Sunshine in the Courtroom Act of 2011	112th	H.R. 2802, S. 410
Sunshine in the Courtroom Act of 2012	112th	H.R. 5163
Sunshine in the Courtroom Act of 2013	113th	H.R. 917, S. 405
Sunshine in the Courtroom Act of 2015	114th	H.R. 917, S. 783
Sunshine in the Courtroom Act of 2017	115th	S. 643
Sunshine in the Courtroom Act of 2019	116th	S. 770
Sunshine in the Courtroom Act of 2021	117th	S. 818
Sunshine in the Courtroom Act of 2023	118th	S. 833
Sunshine in the Courtroom Act of 2025	119th	S. 1133

== See also ==
- Courtroom photography and broadcasting
- Supreme Court of the United States, televised
