= Simon Bryan =

British judge (born 1965)

The Honourable Mr Justice Bryan
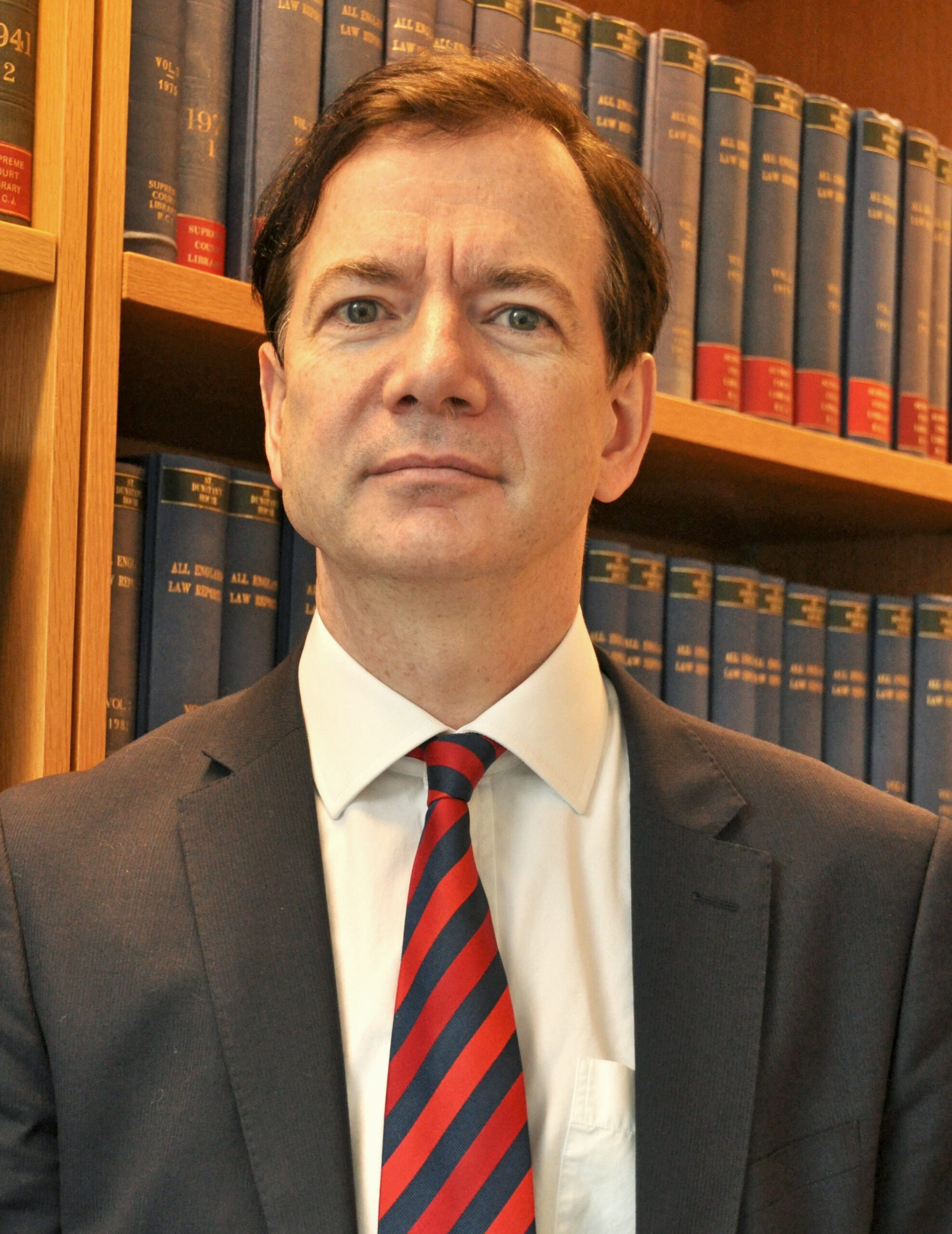
- Bryan in 2022

High Court Judge King's Bench Division
- Incumbent
- Assumed office 2 October 2017
- Monarchs: Elizabeth II; Charles III

Personal details
- Born: 23 November 1965 (age 60) United Kingdom
- Education: Magdalene College, Cambridge

Sir Simon James Bryan (born 23 November 1965) is a British High Court judge.

== Education and early life ==
He was educated at Arnold School. He attended Magdalene College, Cambridge, graduated with a double first-class BA degree on the law Tripos in 1987 and earned several academic prizes.

== Career ==
He was called to the Bar at Lincoln's Inn in 1988 with a Lord Denning Scholarship. He was a supervisor in law at Magdalene College from 1988 to 1989. He practised commercial law from Essex Court Chambers, where he also completed his pupillage, specialising in shipping, oil and gas litigation, insurance and reinsurance disputes and civil fraud. In addition to practice, he has been editor of the Encyclopedia of International Commercial Litigation since 2008. In 2006, he became a Queen's Counsel (took Silk) and from 2009 to 2017 he served as a Recorder of the Crown Court. He was a Deputy High Court Judge from 2013 to 2017 and served as Chief Justice of the Falkland Islands, South Georgia and the South Sandwich Islands, the British Antarctic Territory and the British Indian Ocean Territory from 2015 to 2017.

In 2002, he was made a Freeman of the City of London and is a liveryman of the Worshipful Company of Gardeners. He was a member of the Court at the University of Hertfordshire from 2011 to 2015 and since 2020 has been on the Disciplinary Appeal Committee of Magdalene College, Cambridge.

== High Court appointment ==
On 2 October 2017, he was appointed as a judge of the High Court and assigned to the Queen's Bench Division (now the King's Bench Division). In the same year, he took the customary Knighthood. He sits in the Commercial Court, now part of the Business and Property Division, and is authorised to hear cases in the Financial List and the Competition Appeal Tribunal as well as King's Bench Division work including criminal cases and cases in the Administrative Court. Between 2020 and 2023 he was a Presiding Judge on the South Eastern Circuit.

== Personal life ==
In 1989, he married Katharine Hilton, with whom he has one son and one daughter.

== Arms ==
Coat of arms of Simon Bryan

Motto
Custodite Judicium Et Facite Justitiam

== Notable cases ==
Cases heard by Bryan include:

- R v Dennis McGrory, the oldest double jeopardy murder case (Murder of Jacqueline Montgomery)
- R v Ian Stewart (Murderer of Diane Stewart and the author Helen Bailey)
- R v Bernard Ecclestone (F1 Supremo, Tax Fraud)
- R v Dominic Chappell (Purchaser of BHS, Tax Fraud).
