= Alastair Campbell, Lord Bracadale =

British judge

The Right Honourable Lord Bracadale
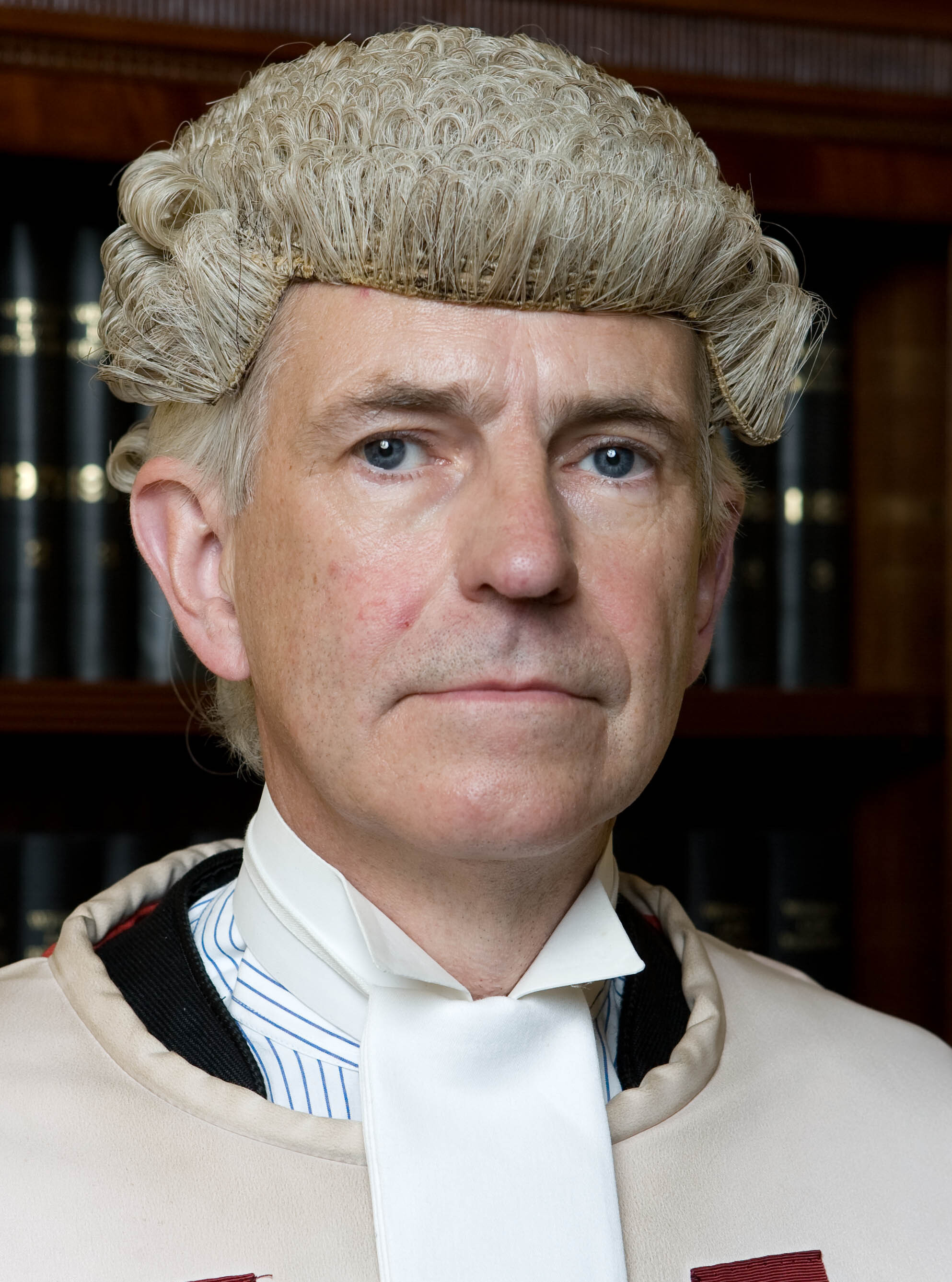
- Bracadale in 2006

Senator of the College of Justice
- In office 2003–2017
- Nominated by: Jack McConnell; As First Minister
- Appointed by: Elizabeth II

Personal details
- Born: Alastair Peter Campbell; 18 September 1949 (age 77) Skye, Scotland
- Spouse: Flora Beaton
- Children: One son, two daughters
- Education: University of Aberdeen; University of Strathclyde
- Occupation: Judge
- Profession: Advocate
- Website: Judiciary of Scotland

Alastair Peter Campbell, Lord Bracadale (born 18 September 1949) is a retired senior Scottish judge.

== Early life ==
Campbell was born on 18 September 1949 in Skye, Scotland, to Rev. Donald Campbell and Margaret Campbell. His family moved to Edinburgh when he was two years old, where he was brought up. He was educated at George Watson's College, and took an MA at the University of Aberdeen. He worked as an English teacher at the Vale of Leven Academy in Dumbartonshire during 1973–75, before returning to university to study law at the University of Strathclyde.

== Legal career ==
Campbell was admitted as a solicitor in 1979 and entered the Crown Office and Procurator Fiscal Service as a prosecutor. He was admitted to the Faculty of Advocates in 1985, called to the English Bar at the Inner Temple in 1990, and served as an Advocate Depute from 1990 until 1993. In 1995, he became a Queen's Counsel and Standing Junior Counsel to HM Customs and Excise. He was a member of the Criminal Justice Forum from 1996 to 1997, the Scottish Criminal Rules Council from 1996 to 1998, and of Criminal Injuries Compensation Board in 1997. In 1997 he was appointed Home Advocate Depute (Scotland's senior prosecutor) and remained in this post until 2001.

=== Lockerbie trial ===
Campbell was senior counsel for the Crown (prosecutor) in the trial over the Lockerbie bombing at the Scottish Court in the Netherlands, under former Lord Advocate Lord Boyd of Duncansby, and alongside Alan Turnbull, also now a judge. Libyan intelligence officer Abdelbaset al-Megrahi was found guilty of the 270 murders, and was sentenced to life imprisonment in 2001. The conviction, though controversial, was upheld on appeal and the successful prosecution brought Campbell international prominence.

== Judicial career ==
In 2003, Campbell was appointed a Senator of the College of Justice, a Judge of the Court of Session and High Court of Justiciary, taking the judicial title "Lord Bracadale". Bracadale is a village on the Isle of Skye. Lord Bracadale has presided over some of the most high-profile and controversial criminal trials in recent Scottish history.

In 2010, he was the judge in HM Advocate v Sheridan and Sheridan.

In 2012, he twice presided over murder trials which resulted in convictions despite the absence of a body. In the first of these, HM Advocate v Gilroy, television cameras were allowed into the High Court in Edinburgh to record the sentencing of the convicted, David Gilroy. This marked the first time in the United Kingdom that a murder sentence was filmed for same day broadcast. The second case was the retrial of Nat Fraser for the murder of Arlene Fraser, his wife, following the quashing of his original conviction as a result of the Supreme Court's decision in Fraser v HM Advocate. This too was filmed, and the resultant two-hour documentary The Murder Trial (shown on Channel 4 on 9 July 2013) included interviews with participants, including Lord Bracadale.

Bracadale took up an appointment to the Inner House on 1 March 2013. He has consequently been appointed, by Her Majesty the Queen, to the Privy Council. He retired as a judge in 2017.

In 2020 he was appointed as chair of the public inquiry into the death of Shekou Bayoh, which as at September 2025 has still not reported its findings. On 21 October 2025, he resigned his position, stating that parties had lost confidence in him after the Scottish Police Federation had previously moved for a Judicial Review against Bracadale.

== Portrayal in popular culture ==
Campbell appears as a character in the British television drama series The Bombing of Pan Am 103. He is played by Alastair Mackenzie.
