= Sarah Munro (judge) =

British judge

Sarah Munro KC is a British barrister and judge. She was educated at the University of Exeter.

In 2021 she acted as coroner at the inquests into the deaths of the four men killed by serial killer Stephen Port. In 2022 she was the first judge to appear on television when cameras were allowed to film her preside over the sentencing of Ben Oliver for the manslaughter of his grandfather, following a change in the law that allowed television cameras limited access to court proceedings in England and Wales. In 2023 she was appointed to lead the inquiry into the wrongful conviction of Andrew Malkinson, who spent 17 years in prison after being wrongfully convicted of rape. In her opening statement Munro said she would be "fearless" in seeking the truth.
