= Court of public opinion =

Influence of the public in court cases

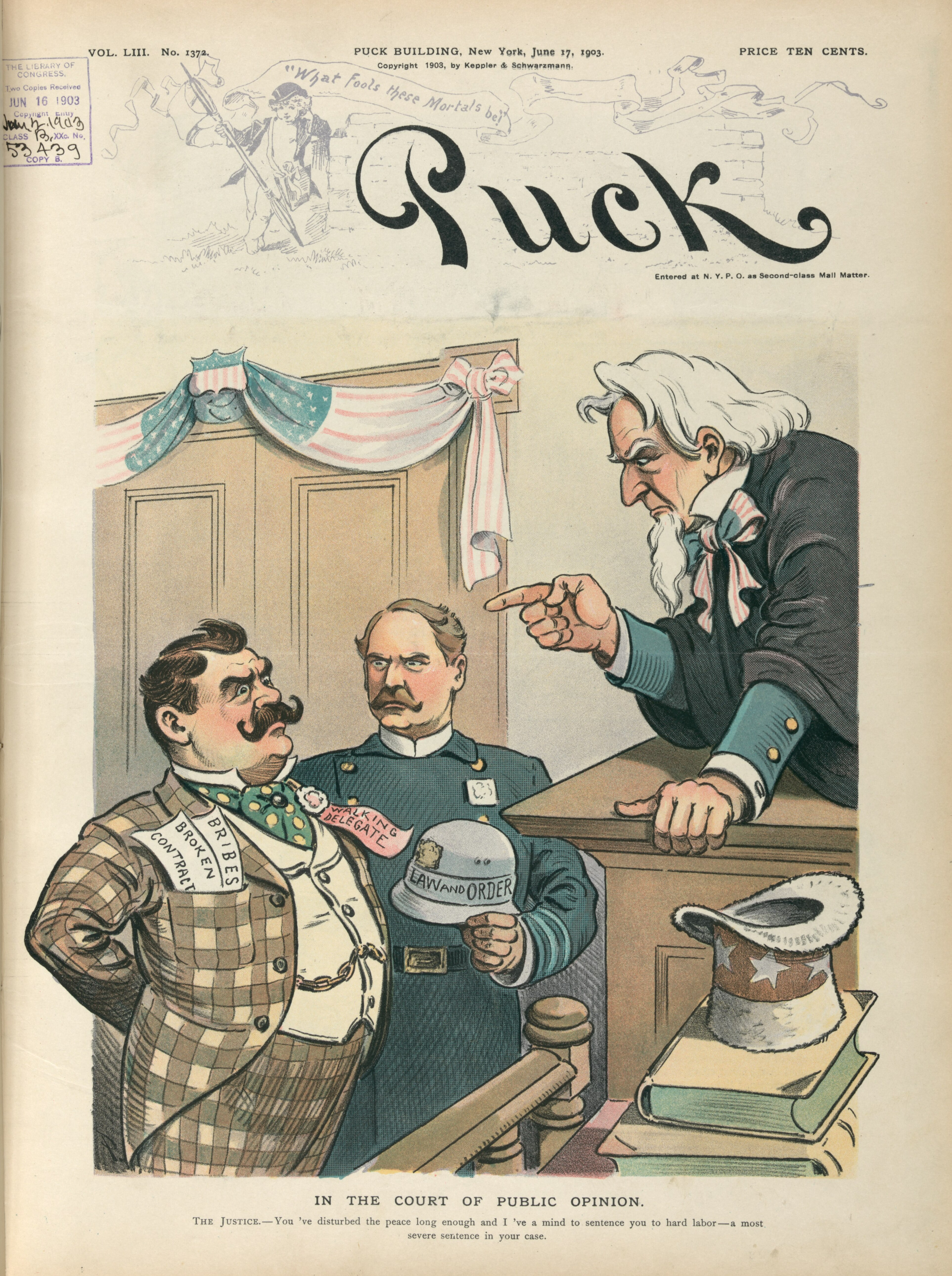
Cover of Puck depicting Uncle Sam as a judge confronting a corrupt union business official, by J. S. Pughe, 1903

Trying cases in the court of public opinion is the use of the media to influence public opinion for one side or the other in a court case. This can result in persons outside the justice system (i.e. people other than the judge or jury) taking action for or against a party. For instance, the reputation of a party may be greatly damaged even if they win the case. Lawyer Robert S. Bennett noted that when he represents high-profile clients, he sometimes finds them in a (figurative) Bermuda Triangle of cross-currents generated by a criminal investigation, the news media, and the U.S. Congress. It has been noted that there is no Fifth Amendment right against self-incrimination in the court of public opinion.

It is said that high-profile cases have important implications for balancing the right of the public to scrutinize the judicial process and the right of the participants to a fair trial. An argument against U.S. ratification of the Statute of the International Criminal Court was that a politically motivated prosecutor might attempt to convict the United States in the court of public opinion of a violation of international law, by charging one of its military or civilian officials with war crimes. The court of public opinion has been described as the most important informal court.

== Instances ==
It could be argued that the prosecutor in the Duke lacrosse case attempted to try the case in the court of public opinion by making unsupported allegations to the media. In the Kobe Bryant sexual assault case, it was alleged that parties were using court pleadings as press releases.

== See also ==
- Courtroom photography and broadcasting
- Presumption of guilt
- Trial by media
