= Peter J. Woolley =

American political scientist

Dr. Peter J. Woolley
- Born: New York City

Academic background
- Education: University of Pittsburgh, (Ph.D.)
- Alma mater: St. Joseph's University

Academic work
- Discipline: Political Science
- Sub-discipline: Polling, Japanese history, military history, American politics
- Institutions: Fairleigh Dickinson University

Peter J. Woolley is an American political scientist, pollster, and founding director of PublicMind—an independent public opinion research group at Fairleigh Dickinson University. His research in public opinion and his commentary have been cited on a range of public issues including the effect of cable news on voter information, the constitutionality of public prayer, traffic safety, drone warfare, measuring support for independent candidates, and televising the US Supreme Court, He is also cited on New Jersey's gubernatorial politics since Governor James McGreevey through Governors Richard Codey, Jon Corzine, Chris Christie, and Phil Murphy, as well as on US Senate elections, presidential politics, congressional races, and other New Jersey policy debates such as affordable housing, Atlantic City and the gambling industry, residential segregation, and even on the effects on public opinion of the TV reality show Jersey Shore by gossip columnist Perez Hilton.

== Education and career ==
Woolley was awarded the Ph.D. by the University of Pittsburgh in 1989. He studied at the Sorbonne and at the University of Bordeaux and later in Japan as a member of a Fulbright/Hays Group Project: He was an Advanced Research Scholar at the US Naval War College (1994–95) and won the Miller History Prize from the US Naval War College in 1997 for his contribution "The Role of Strategy in Great Power Decline." He also authored two books on U.S.-Japan defense relations, Japan's Navy: Politics and Paradox (Lynne-Reinner, 2000) and Geography and Japan's Strategic Choices (Potomac, 2005). Woolley took over the direction of PublicMind in 2002 and nurtured it from an obscure upstart in polling to a nationally cited source of public opinion on campaigns and elections as well as a variety of national issues such as automobile safety, eminent domain, gambling, the impact of candidates' gender on voters, and even the impact on New Jersey of the TV shows, The Sopranos and Jersey Shore.

== Selected bibliography ==
- Geography and Japan's Strategic Choices: From Seclusion to Internationalization (Alexandria, Va.: Potomac Books, 2005).
- Japan's Navy: Politics and Paradox, 1971-2001, Foreword by James E. Auer. (Boulder, Col.: Lynne-Rienner Publishers, 2000).
- American Politics: Core Argument and Current Controversy, Woolley, Peter J. and Albert Papa, eds. (Upper Saddle River, N.J.: Prentice-Hall Publishers, 2002).
