= Murder of Surjit Singh Chhokar =

1998 murder in Scotland

The murder of Surjit Singh Chhokar occurred in November 1998 in Overtown, North Lanarkshire, Scotland. Two prosecutions – in 1999 and in 2000 – were unsuccessful. Two inquiries were held that reported in 2001. Eighteen years after the crime, in October 2016, a conviction was made. This was only the second time in Scottish legal history that a person was tried twice for the same crime. This controversial case raised a number of complicated legal issues, including the double jeopardy rule, as well as institutional racism on the part of investigating police and prosecutors.

== Murder ==
Three men confronted Surjit Singh Chhokar on the night of 4 November 1998. Ronnie Coulter, his nephew Andrew Coulter and another man, David Montgomery, went to see Chhokar following a dispute over a £100.17 Giro cheque. Chhokar was stabbed three times, with one wound piercing his heart. Chhokar collapsed in front of his partner Liz Bryce.

Within days of the murder, the three suspects had been arrested.

== First trials ==
In March 1999 the case was heard at the Glasgow High Court, although that had only led to a conviction of assault. Lord McCluskey, who was at the time Scotland's longest-serving judge, presided over the trial and was highly critical that only one person appeared in the dock. The Chhokar Family Justice Campaign was launched on 22 March. It received support from the father of Stephen Lawrence, a black teenager murdered in London in 1993.

In November 2000 Andrew Coulter and David Montgomery were put on trial but acquitted. By now Aamer Anwar was spokesman for the family.

In February 2001 Ronnie Coulter and Sandra Tierney were each given the maximum prison sentence for contempt of court and sentenced to two years' imprisonment.

== Inquiries into the system ==
In October 2001 two reports were published. Solicitor Dr Raj Jandoo looked at the liaison arrangements between the police, the Crown office and procurator fiscal service and the relatives and partner of Mr Chhokar. Jandoo's report found that Strathclyde police had failed to investigate whether the murder was racially aggravated. The report contained forty recommendations. Sir Anthony Campbell, justice of the supreme court of Northern Ireland, looked at the crown office. Campbell did not unearth institutional racism, but did identify some failings and recommended nine major changes for the prosecuting authority. Chhokar's family had not cooperated with the authors of either of the reports.

In 2012 the Lord Advocate Frank Mulholland instructed Strathclyde Police to look at the case again.

== Re-trial in 2016 ==
In March 2015 Ronnie Coulter appeared at the High Court of Glasgow and was again charged with murder. Lord Bannatyne presided and Donald Findlay QC defended.

The re-trial of Ronnie Coulter was held in October 2016 and lasted four weeks. Alex Prentice QC prosecuted, Donald Findlay QC defended, and Aamer Anwar acted for the Chhokar family. Coulter was eventually convicted of Chhokar's murder.

On 31 October, Judge Lord Matthews sentenced Coulter to life imprisonment with a minimum term of 19 years and 8 months (twenty years, including the four months he had already spent in custody). The following month he lodged a notice of his intention to appeal against his conviction and sentence with the Appeal Court in Edinburgh.
