= Murder of Fawziyah Javed =

2021 murder in Scotland

Fawziyah Javed
- Born: 4 September 1989; Leeds, UK
- Died: 2 September 2021 (aged 31); Holyrood Park
- Cause of death: Murder - pushed from height

Fawziyah Javed (4 September 1989 – 2 September 2021) was a British-Pakistani lawyer who was murdered by her husband Kashif Anwar after he pushed her off Arthur's Seat in Edinburgh, Scotland. At the time of her death, Fawziyah was pregnant; she had planned to divorce Anwar and raise her first child as a single parent.

On 6 April 2023, Anwar was found guilty of the murder of his wife, and was sentenced to life imprisonment with a minimum term of twenty years. Her family launched the Fawziyah Javed Foundation.

In 2024, Channel 4 released the documentary The Push: Murder on the Cliff about the murder and trial.

== Life ==
Fawziyah Javed was born on 4 September 1989 in Leeds, England, UK to her parents Mohammed and Yasmin Javed, who were second-generation British Pakistanis. An only child, Fawziyah grew up within a loving extended family of uncles and aunts. Fawziyah wanted to be a lawyer from the age of eight, according to her maternal uncle Shahid Farouk, and she enrolled at the University of Sheffield where she graduated with a law degree. As a lawyer, she did charity work for people in South Asian communities. In August 2019, Fawziyah and her mother met Kashif Anwar, an optical assistant at Vision Express, and they began a relationship after a few months.

The couple were married on 20 December 2020. During the marriage, Kashif became controlling and abusive towards his wife Fawziyah on multiple occasions while living with her in-laws. In one incident, Fawziyah was punched by him at a cemetery. Kashif began stealing money from her bank account which her mother had given to her. Fawziyah told her mother that she had endured physical and emotional abuse during her marriage with Kashif, and her mother urged her to get a divorce.

== Death ==
During her marriage, Fawziyah became pregnant which ultimately caused her to decide to leave her husband Kashif Anwar to live with her parents to raise her child in a safe environment. Her evidence for divorce proceedings against Anwar included recordings in which Fawziyah accused her husband of ruining her life. In September 2021, Fawziyah agreed to travel with Kashif to Edinburgh, despite her parents' concerns. During court proceedings, the mother of the victim mentioned that her daughter planned to celebrate her 32nd birthday immediately after moving away from Kashif. CCTV footage revealed that the couple had lunch together at St Andrew Square, before walking to Arthur's Seat. During the descent from Arthur's seat, Kashif pushed Fawziyah who fell 50 feet, sustaining a head injury which caused her death.

== Trial ==
Kashif Anwar was convicted of Fawziyah's murder at his trial in April 2023. The case for the prosecution was led by Alex Prentice KC. Her family members testified against Anwar including his controlling behaviour towards Fawziyah.

The Trial Judge John Beckett, Lord Beckett sentenced him to life imprisonment, with a minimum term of 20 years.
