= Fix the Court =

U.S. federal court reform advocacy group

- Formation: Tax-exempt since April 2021; 5 years ago
- Type: 501(c)(3)
- Tax ID no.: EIN: 861840317
- Headquarters: Brooklyn
- Region served: United States
- Executive Director: Gabe Roth
- Revenue: $175,416 (2024)
- Expenses: $221,412 (2024)
- Website: fixthecourt.com

Fix the Court is an advocacy group that seeks reform of the U.S. federal court system. The group lobbies for term limits for members of the U.S. Supreme Court, for streaming live audio and video of the court's oral arguments, and for publicizing potential conflicts of interest among justices. Fix the Court submitted multiple Freedom of Information Act requests related to the Supreme Court nominations of Neil Gorsuch and Brett Kavanaugh, as well as for all 25 people that former President Donald Trump put on his shortlist of potential Supreme Court nominees.

When Brett Kavanaugh was nominated to the U.S. Supreme Court, Fix the Court bought several Internet domain names related to Kavanaugh and redirected them to websites including End Rape On Campus, the National Sexual Violence Resource Center, and the Rape, Abuse & Incest National Network. Fix the Court's executive director, Gabe Roth, said he purchased and redirected the websites because he believed the sexual assault allegations made by Christine Blasey Ford against Brett Kavanaugh and by Anita Hill against Clarence Thomas.

Fix the Court was initially funded by the New Venture Fund. Since February 2021, Fix the Court has been registered with the Internal Revenue Service as an 501(c)(3) nonprofit.

The Washington Examiner reported in 2023 that Fix the Court had filed tax form 990-N (e-postcard) for the tax period 2021. When the Examiner asked Roth for the group's financial disclosures, he inadvertently included their donor list, which he did not have to disclose to the public, and said he had mailed form 990 to the IRS. The Washington Examiner reported later in 2023 that Fix the Court may have failed to disclose lobbying in 2021 and 2022 on tax forms and was accused by conservative watchdog group National Legal and Policy Center in an IRS complaint of violating federal law.

Roth said on a podcast in 2023 that he had "been corrected" on not disclosing lobbying and Fix the Court updated its financial disclosures to reflect the grassroots lobbying.

== See also ==
- Demand Justice
