= Suicide of Kimberly Milne =

2023 suicide in Dundee, Scotland

HM Advocate v Milne
- Court: High Court of Justiciary
- Full case name: His Majesty's Advocate v Lee Milne

Court membership
- Judge sitting: Lorna Drummond, Lady Drummond

Case opinions
- Lee Milne found guilty of culpable homicide and related charges

Kimberly Milne was a Scottish woman who died by suicide on 27 July 2023 after jumping from a bridge in Dundee over the A90 road and into traffic.

In 2026 her husband Lee Milne was prosecuted in relation to her death, at the High Court of Justiciary in Glasgow. The prosecution was led by Alex Prentice, regarded as Scotland's most experienced prosecutor, while the defence was led by Mark Stewart. The prosecution acknowledged that Milne had not directly caused Kimberly's death, but argued that her suicide was motivated by a desire to escape her relationship with Milne, who had physically and verbally abused her for over a year. The defence argued that her suicide was a result of pre-existing mental health problems.

Milne was found guilty of culpable homicide and of related domestic abuse charges in April 2026. Following his conviction, it was reported that he had been convicted of sexually assaulting two boys in 2024 while awaiting trial for Kimberly's death and sentenced to a three-year community order. He was sentenced to eight years in prison.

This was the first case in Scottish legal history in which a domestic abuser was found guilty by a jury of causing their victim's suicide, though a similar case in England in 2017 had ended when the defendant pleaded guilty. Two other cases, in 2006 and 2025, had ended in acquittals.
