= Murder of Brenda Page =

1978 murder in Aberdeen, Scotland

Dr Brenda Page was murdered in her home in Allan Street, Aberdeen on 14 July 1978. The case remained an unsolved murder for almost 45 years until her former husband, Christopher Harrisson, who had been a suspect in the original investigation, was convicted in the High Court, Aberdeen in March 2023, and sentenced to life imprisonment with a minimum period of 20 years before parole. Harrisson died in prison in October 2026.

== Dr Brenda Page ==
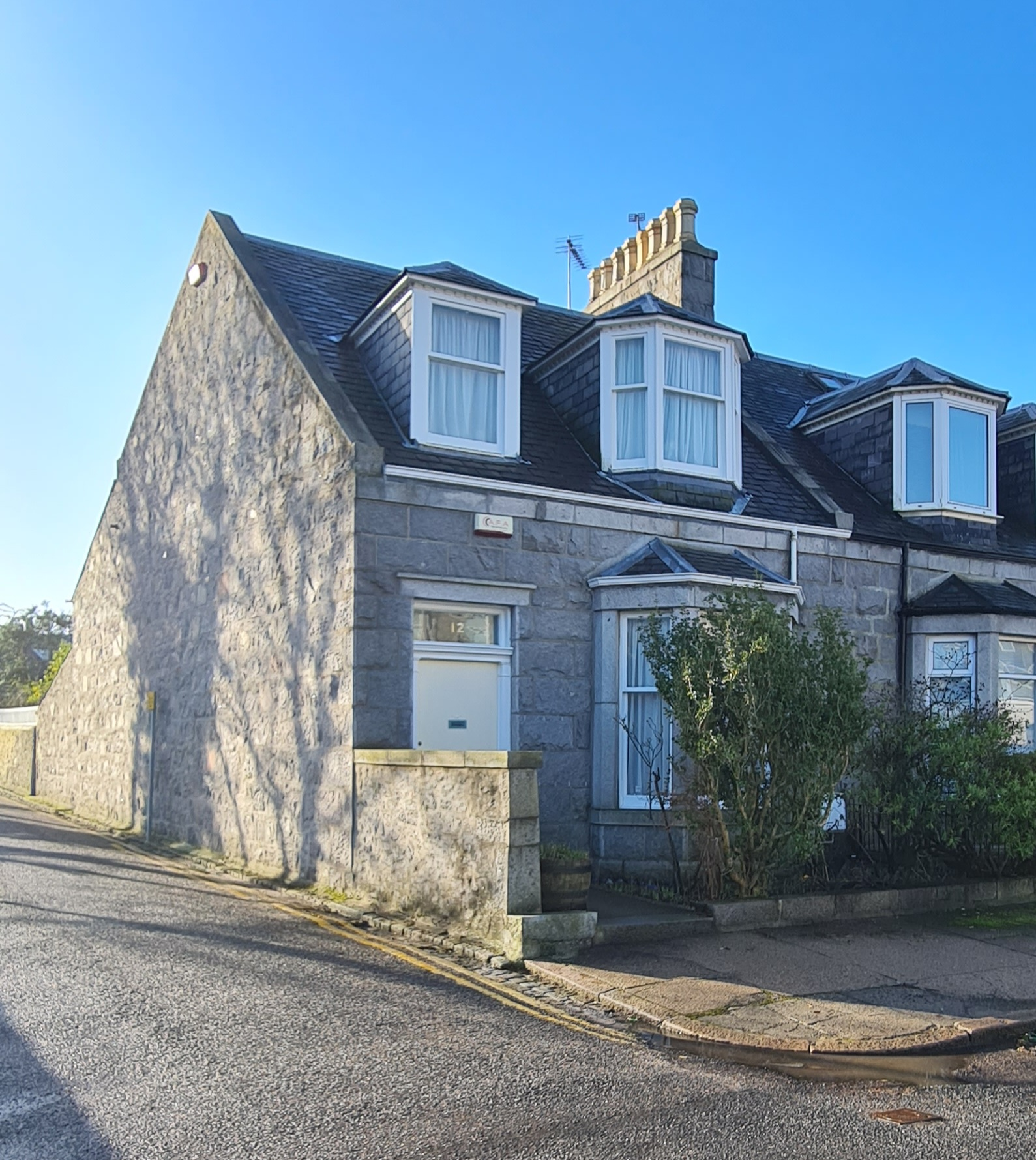
12 Mile-End Place, Aberdeen, the house previously shared by Dr Brenda Page and her killer, Christopher Harrisson

Page was born in Ipswich. She studied zoology at University College London taking a first class honours BSc degree. She then studied at the University of Glasgow where she gained a PhD in genetics. While studying in Glasgow in 1971 she met her future husband Christopher Merlin Harnett Harrisson, born 1940. They married on 6 May 1972 in Ipswich.

In 1973, Page was appointed as principal of the recently formed genetics department at the University of Aberdeen Medical School. Harrisson continued his studies in Edinburgh, before also moving to Aberdeen where they bought a house together at 12 Mile-End Place. They separated within four years and were divorced in 1977.

Harrisson was born in Ripon in North Yorkshire. He had studied at Queens' College, Cambridge. He later became a tutor in biology at Harvard University in the United States. After moving back to the United Kingdom, Harrisson worked as a researcher at a virus research centre in Glasgow, where they met.

Prior to her murder Page had begun to work as an escort in her spare time, via Capital Escorts, an Edinburgh agency, meeting businessmen in restaurants in Aberdeen for meals. The night before she died she had been at the Tree Tops Hotel, Springfield Road, Aberdeen, with two men. She had been saving money from that work to buy the Allan Street flat.

== Crime ==
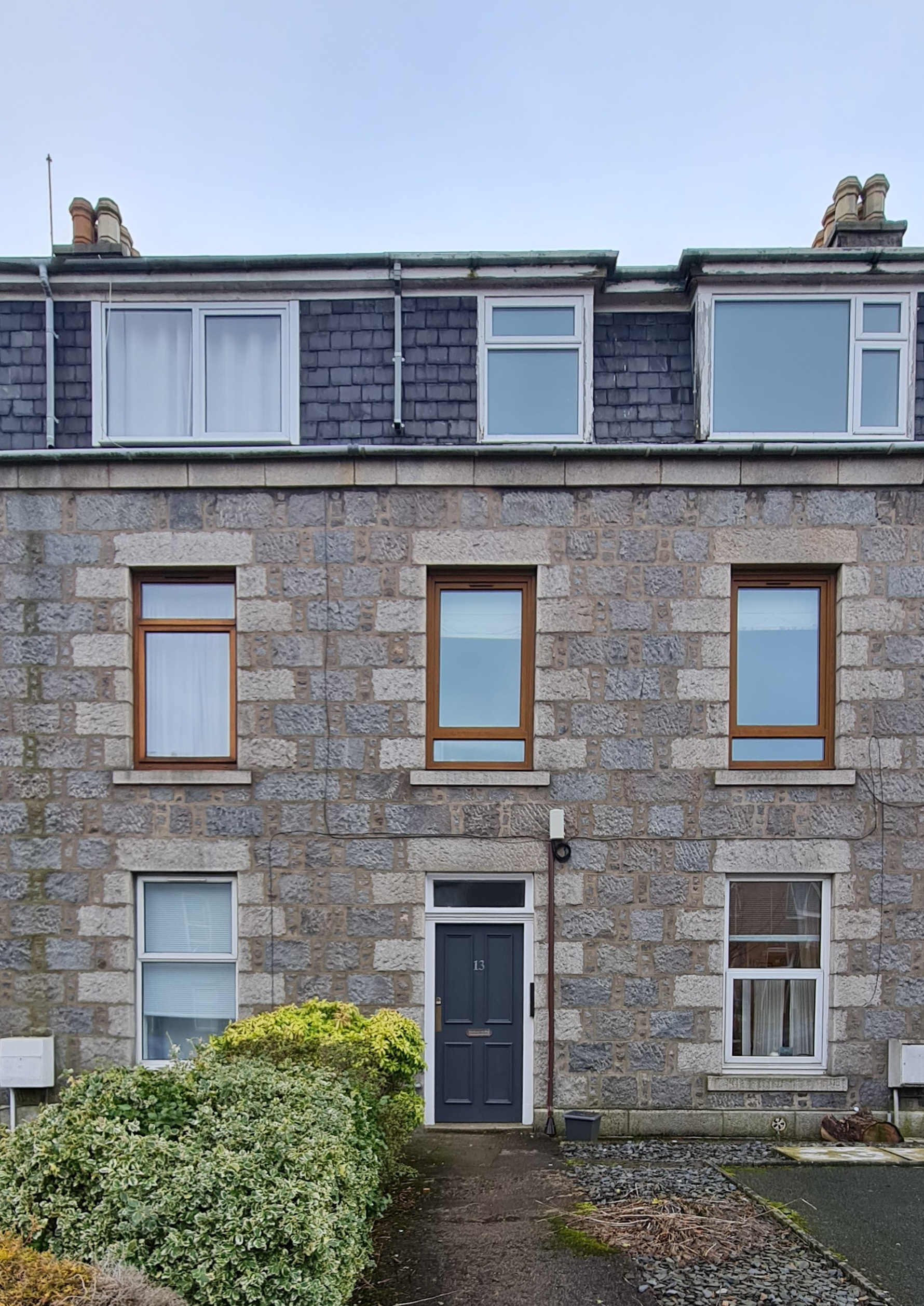
13 Allan Street – Brenda Page's flat was ground floor, left

Brenda Page's body was found in her flat on the ground floor of 13 Allan Street, Aberdeen on 15 July 1978. She was found lifeless, in her nightdress, on her bed. She had suffered at least 20 blunt-force injuries to her head and face, as well as defensive injuries to her hands, The original post-mortem concluded that she had suffered a violent assault. She was 32 years of age.

== Original investigation ==
Police assigned around 35 detectives and 50 uniformed officers to the investigation during its first week. They made 550 inquiries and collected more than 200 statements. Over 5,000 posters were distributed across the city.

Police hunted for a green duffel bag which they believed may contain the murder weapon, blood-stained clothes, shoes, and a watch. They searched Aberdeen University campus, divers hunted in the River Dee, and 50 uniformed police officers searched the verges of what is now the A90 Aberdeen to Stonehaven road, and the railway line south. Aberdeen residents were asked to check for bloodstained clothing and a weapon in their bins, and police officers shadowed bin workers on their rounds in Stonehaven. Harrisson was a prime suspect in the original investigation.

The original investigation was wound down in 1980.

== Re-investigation ==
According to Police Scotland, the original investigation had been reviewed several times over the intervening 37 years, culminating in a final re-investigation in 2015 by the Major Investigation Team North. This review re-assessed all the available material gathered over that long period. It not only reviewed previously-given witness statement but also involved, where it could be done, re-interviewing people who had given information about the case. Modern techniques such as DNA analysis were also applied.

In March 2020, it was disclosed that a 79-year-old man had been arrested in connection with the unsolved case and that 800 new pieces of evidence had been amassed.

== Trial and conviction ==
Harrisson's case called for a pleading diet on 11 February 2022. He pled not guilty to all charges and a trial date was set. When the case called for trial on 26 August 2022 the defence advocate, David Moggach advised the High Court that he could no longer represent Harrisson, and the Judge Lord Richardson said it was "plainly very regrettable" but discharged the current trial diet. The case called again the following month and a fresh trial was set.

=== Indictment ===
Harrisson was accused of assaulting Brenda Page on various occasions and in various locations between 1972 and 1976.

He was accused of breach of the peace by threatening violence to her and placing her in a state of fear and alarm for her safety.

It was also alleged that between 1976 and 1978 he committed a breach of the peace by threatening to kill her and keeping track of her movements.

He was accused of murdering Brenda Page by forcing entry to her flat in Allan Street on 14 July 1978 and repeatedly striking her on the head and body with a blunt implement.

Mr Harrisson was further accused of attempting to defeat the ends of justice by disposing of a watch and a bag and contents including a pair of shoes, with the intent to destroy forensic evidence and to avoid detection and prosecution.

=== Trial ===
The trial was started 21 February 2023. Harrisson, who was represented by advocate Brian McConnachie, denied all charges, and lodged a special defence of alibi to the murder charge, stating at the time of the alleged crime he was at home. Alex Prentice prosecuted.

Witnesses were called to testify to the nature of Page and Harrisson's relationship; how she was afraid of him; and how he had threatened her and told another friend that he would kill her. They said that Harrisson had claimed that Page had stolen his research work. Harrisson had written a letter to Page where he referred to his having suffered "rages of which you were afraid", which undermined his claims that they had a good relationship and she was never afraid of him.

A friend of Page's recalled "Brenda asked me to tell police if anything had happened to her in unusual circumstances that her husband was responsible and I told them that". Page's solicitor gave evidence that she had written to him: “If I depart this Earth rather suddenly, do please make sure that I get a good PM (post mortem) and that my sister and her boys get any benefit.” Other witnesses testified that Harrisson was physically violent towards Page during their marriage and that he had stalked and harassed her following their divorce even after she took out a court order barring him from having any contact with her.

Harrisson's sperm was found on the bedsheet in Page's flat where her body was lying, although Harrisson had told the police that he never ejaculated inside the flat. Flakes of green paint had also been found near the window, believed to have rubbed off while the killer was climbing through the window, and were found to be identical to paint inside Harrisson's car. Harrisson's defence argued that the paint samples from the crime scene may have been contaminated, and that the sperm could have been deposited on the bedsheet when Harrisson and Page had sex while they were married, as the sheet had originally come from their marital home.

Harrisson denied abusing Page, testifying that she had pretended she was being abused by him in order to punish him for failing to give her children. He also denied allegations that he had accused her of "whoring" when he found out about her escorting job. On cross-examination he was asked to read out letters between him and Page which contradicted his testimony.

Harrisson, aged 82, was convicted by a majority verdict at the High Court, Aberdeen on 9 March 2023 and sentenced to life imprisonment with a minimum period of 20 years before he could be considered for parole, meaning he would be 102 by the time he would be eligible for parole.

Scottish Prison Service announced that Harrisson, aged 85, had died on 3 October 2026 at HMP Grampian.

== Press coverage ==
The murder has been much covered in the media both at the time of the immediate investigation, and subsequently when Harrisson was first charged then convicted. The trial was the subject of a two-part documentary which first aired in January 2024, on BBC Two and BBC Scotland channels. It was also the subject of two podcasts. In January 2024, it was reported that the University of Aberdeen was planning to install a plaque to Dr Brenda Page's memory next to its laboratories and to plant a tree in her memory.
