= Cameras in the Supreme Court of the United States =

The Supreme Court of the United States does not allow cameras in the courtroom when the court is in session, a policy which is the subject of much debate. Although the Court has never allowed cameras in its courtroom, it does make audiotapes of oral arguments and opinions available to the public. Additionally, the Court has provided live audio of all oral arguments since May 2020.

== Legislative proposals and debate ==
In 2009, Pennsylvania Senator Arlen Specter and seven co-sponsors introduced a resolution to express the sense of Congress that sessions of the Court should be televised. In 2009, Specter also introduced a bill that would require open sessions of the Court to be televised. Upon introducing his bill to require televising the Supreme Court of the United States proceedings, Arlen Specter announced, "the Supreme Court makes pronouncements on constitutional and federal law that have direct impacts on the rights of Americans. Those rights would be substantially enhanced by televising the oral arguments of the Court so that the public can see and hear the issues presented." Eight U.S. Senators co-sponsored Spector's resolution.

Ted Poe, R-TX2, introduced a related bill in the House of Representatives in January 2009. The only exception to televising the Court under this legislation would be if a majority of justices decided that "allowing such coverage in a particular case would violate the due process rights of any of the parties involved."

=== Support ===
Supporters of Specter's proposal reason that other government proceedings are already televised, including sessions of both the House of Representatives and the Senate, covered most frequently by C-SPAN. By televising the Court, they argue that Americans would have more access to the most important institution in the U.S. judiciary, which would result in a more open and transparent government. Bruce Peabody of Fairleigh Dickinson University contends that televising the Supreme Court of the United States proceedings can change the way Americans view public policy by bringing greater attention to the Court. A 2010 New York Times editorial states that public access to the court would give Americans the opportunity to get a closer look at how a powerful branch of government operates. It adds that the televising the Court would hold presidents accountable for the justices they nominate. The editorial reasons, "right now, we see the justices during their confirmation hearings and rarely after that."

During her confirmation hearing in 2009, Justice Sonia Sotomayor indicated that she is open to the idea of televising court proceedings, stating, "I have had positive experiences with cameras. When I have been asked to join experiments of using cameras in the courtroom, I have participated. I have volunteered."

Cameras in the Court has also been supported by advocacy groups including Fix the Court.

=== Opposition ===
Opponents of Specter's proposal believe that requiring the proceedings of the Supreme Court of the United States to be televised is a threat to judicial independence and, thus, the separation of powers. In addition, several justices of the Court have objected to the proposed legislation, including Justice Anthony Kennedy who argues that the measure would not align with the "etiquette" and "deference" that should "apply between branches." Furthermore, some justices believe televising the proceedings would change the way they act in the courtroom. Justice Clarence Thomas also contends that televising Court proceedings would reduce the level of anonymity that justices now have and could raise security concerns. Opponents also believe that television coverage would also take away from the mystery of the court and cause the public to misinterpret the Court and its processes.

Scholars have also debated the constitutionality of legislatively requiring the televising of Supreme Court proceedings.

== Public opinion ==
In March 2010, Fairleigh Dickinson University's PublicMind Poll found in a national poll that more than 60% of voters think that televising the Supreme Court of the United States proceedings would be "good for democracy." 26% think that televising the proceedings would "undermine the authority of the court."

Voters have mixed opinions on the effect of television coverage on court decisions. While 45% say that televising Court's proceedings would be good "because the judges would consider public opinion more" in making decisions, 31% say TV would be bad because justices would consider public opinion too much. 25% say are not sure or say that televising the Court would have no effect on its legal decisions. While a majority of voters presently watch government proceedings infrequently if at all, half of voters (50%) say they would watch the Supreme Court of the United States' proceedings sometimes or regularly if they were televised. Only 10% say they’d never watch the court.

Dr. Peter Woolley, director of the FDU poll, said, “Voters are certainly curious about the court, which is both powerful and largely out of the public eye. After the novelty wears off, the primary audience might be lawyers and lobbyists, rather than any broad swath of voters. Most voters will only see it when commercial media select the most controversial bits and pieces.” But Peabody disagreed, “The rationale for televising the court is not to guarantee the public will watch it, but to give democracy’s citizens more opportunities to educate themselves. It is unlikely people will know more about the court by seeing it less.”

Noting the FDU poll, the editors of The New York Times subsequently opined that televising the Court "would allow Americans to see for themselves how an extremely powerful part of their government works" and "allow voters to hold presidents accountable for the quality of justices they nominate.

== Audio recordings and broadcasts ==
The Supreme Court began making audio recordings of its sessions in 1955, for storage at the National Archives and Records Administration. Starting in 1993, these were released to the public for the first time by the court itself, after the end of each term. In 2010, Chief Justice John Roberts began the practice of posting the recordings online at the end of each week. Occasionally these would be released same-day for cases of particular interest. The COVID-19 pandemic in the United States forced the court to hear arguments by teleconference, and for the first time it allowed the public beyond the courtroom to listen in real time on May 4, 2020.

== Unauthorized use of cameras ==
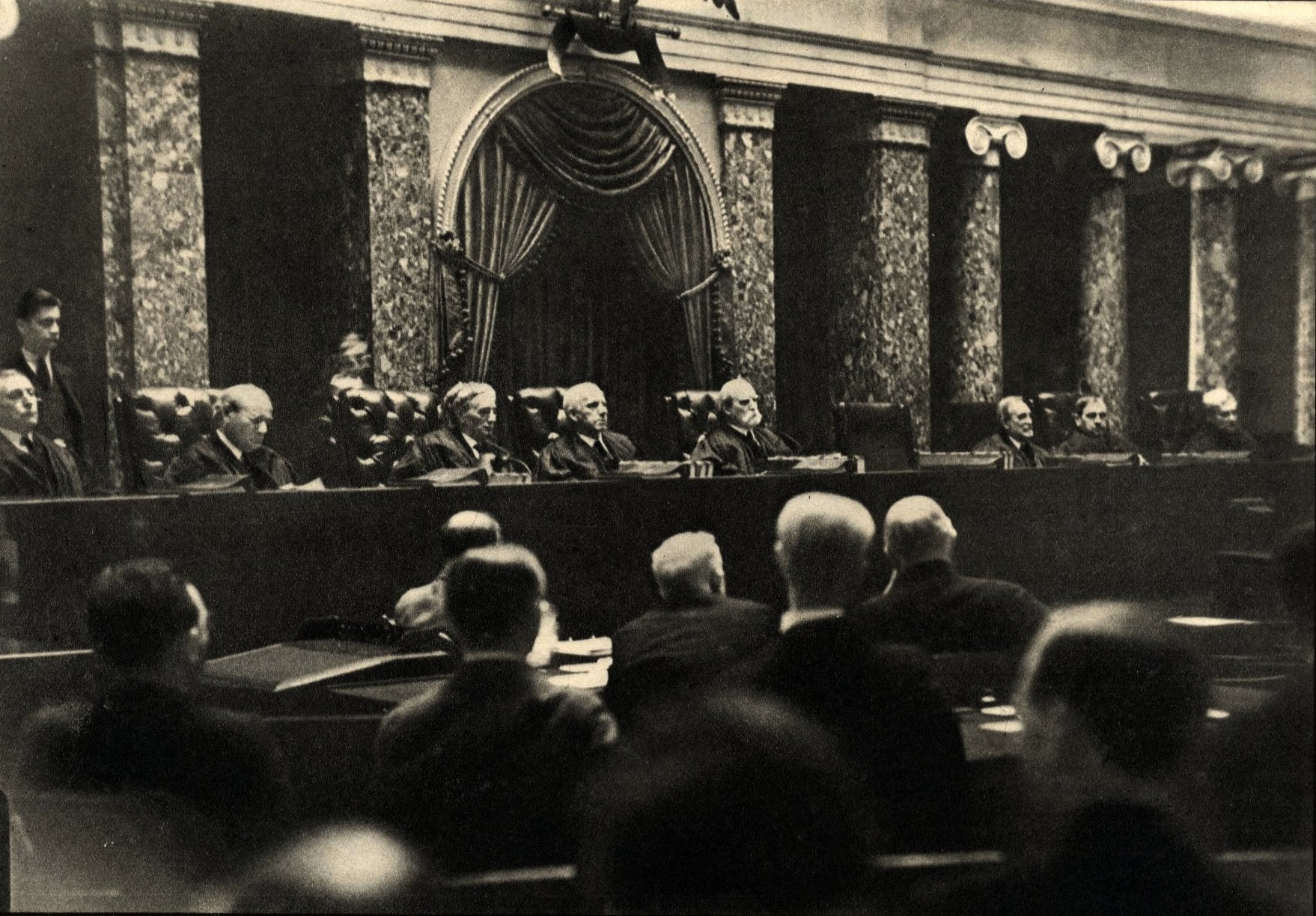
Supreme Court photograph by Salomon

Notwithstanding the prohibition on cameras, there have been instances of unauthorized use of cameras to photograph the courtroom while the court was in session. In either March 28 or May 16 of 1932, Erich Salomon caught a single photograph of a session of the Hughes Court, which was published in Fortune magazine. In 1937, another photograph of the Hughes Court in session was taken by an unnamed photographer, which was published in Time magazine. In 2014, a short video recording of the Roberts Court in session was published on YouTube by 99Rise, a progressive social movement organization.

== See also ==
- Sunshine in the Courtroom Act
- Fix the Court
