= Sentencing of Ben Oliver =

Criminal case in England

The sentencing of Ben Oliver, a 25-year-old man convicted of the manslaughter of his grandfather, was the culmination of a Crown Court case in England and Wales, and the sentencing was the first criminal court proceeding in England and Wales to be televised. Oliver was convicted of killing his 74-year-old bedbound grandfather, David Oliver, of Mottingham, South East London, following a trial at the Old Bailey, where he had pleaded not guilty to murder. At the televised hearing, which took place in Court Two of the Old Bailey at 10 am on 28 July 2022, he was sentenced to life imprisonment with a minimum of ten years by Her Honour Judge Sarah Munro QC.

== Manslaughter ==
Oliver, of Bexleyheath, South East London, killed his grandfather David Oliver in a knife attack on 19 January 2021 after becoming "very angry" upon learning of historic sexual abuse allegations his grandfather had allegedly committed against girls. At the time of his death, David Oliver was bedbound following a stroke. At his trial, the court heard how Ben Oliver had used a kitchen knife to inflict 21 stab wounds on his grandfather, cutting his throat "with severe force" and stabbing him in the mouth and eyes until "he was utterly powerless". The trial also heard that Oliver, who was diagnosed with autistic spectrum disorder at a young age, had suffered physical and sexual abuse at the hands of his stepfather as a child, and had a previous conviction from 2016 for sexual offences against a young girl he committed as a minor. The court was told that his mental health had deteriorated during the COVID-19 pandemic to the point that he became obsessed about catching COVID and asked his grandmother to help him commit suicide. He was cleared of murder but convicted of manslaughter after pleading guilty due to diminished responsibility. He was sentenced to life imprisonment with a minimum of ten years and eight months, but with time deducted for the period he had already spent in prison, meaning he will serve a minimum of nine years before being considered for parole. Judge Munro described him as a "very damaged man" and "a significant risk to the public".

== Televising of sentencing ==
The use of cameras in court had been illegal since unauthorised pictures of the 1910 trial of Dr Crippen were published by the international media, prompting Parliament to legislate against the taking of photographs.

Media outlets had long campaigned for cameras to be allowed into court following televised hearings in Scotland, the first of which took place in 1992. But The Guardian has noted resistance to the move, often amid concerns of sensationalising court cases, such as was the case in the United States with the 1995 trial of O. J. Simpson. The first court proceedings to be filmed in England and Wales occurred in 2010 with the creation of the Supreme Court, while the Court of Appeal first allowed in cameras in 2013. The filming of criminal proceedings was finally given approval in 2020 with the passing through Parliament of the Crown Court (Recording and Broadcasting) Order 2020. Implementation was then delayed because of the onset of the COVID-19 pandemic, although cameras in court became more common during the pandemic with the use of video links to enable legal proceedings to continue.

On 27 July 2022, Dominic Raab, the Secretary of State for Justice, announced that broadcasting would commence from the following day. Making the announcement Raab said "the public will now be able to see justice handed down, helping them understand better the complex decisions judges make". The change in the law allows the sentencing phase of serious criminal cases to be filmed for broadcast by television networks such as the BBC, ITV and Sky News, as well as being made available online, but the filming of entire cases remains unpermitted, and courtroom sketches must continue to be drawn by artists from memory outside court. For the hearing the camera is placed at the back of the courtroom and focused on the judge; no other court officials, barristers, the defendant, witnesses, jurors or the public gallery can be filmed. There is also a ten-second delay between the filming and broadcast of any hearings in order to allow for errors, such as a breach of reporting restrictions.

On 28 October 2022, 38-year-old Jemma Mitchell became the first woman to have her sentencing for murder televised, when she was jailed for 34 years for murdering and decapitating her friend Mee Kuen Chong, 67, and dumping her headless body in woodlands more than 200 miles (320 km) away.

== See also ==
- Murder of Suzanne Pilley, a 2010 Scottish murder case whose sentencing hearing was broadcast by STV in 2012
- Courtroom photography and broadcasting
