= Arthur's Seat =

Mountainous hill in Edinburgh, Scotland

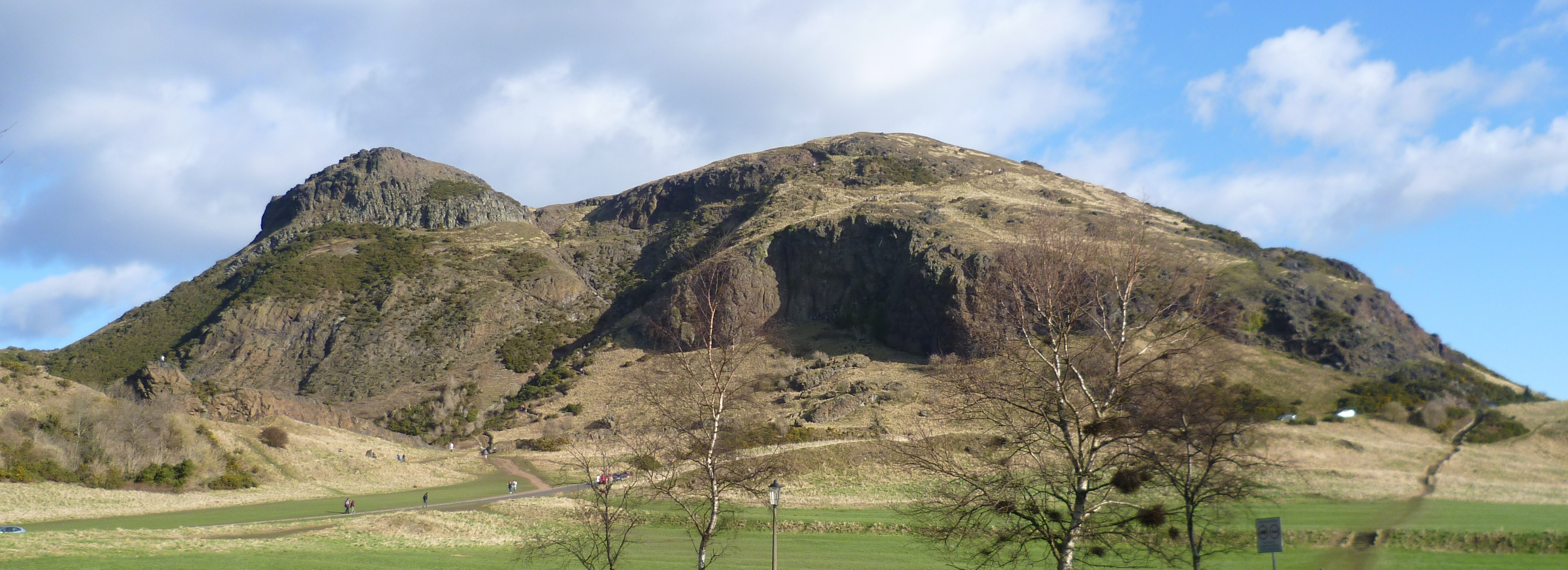

Highest point
- Elevation: 251 m (823 ft)
- Prominence: 174 m (571 ft)
- Isolation: 6.93 km (4.31 mi)
- Listing: Marilyn
- Coordinates: 55°56′39″N 3°09′43″W

Geography
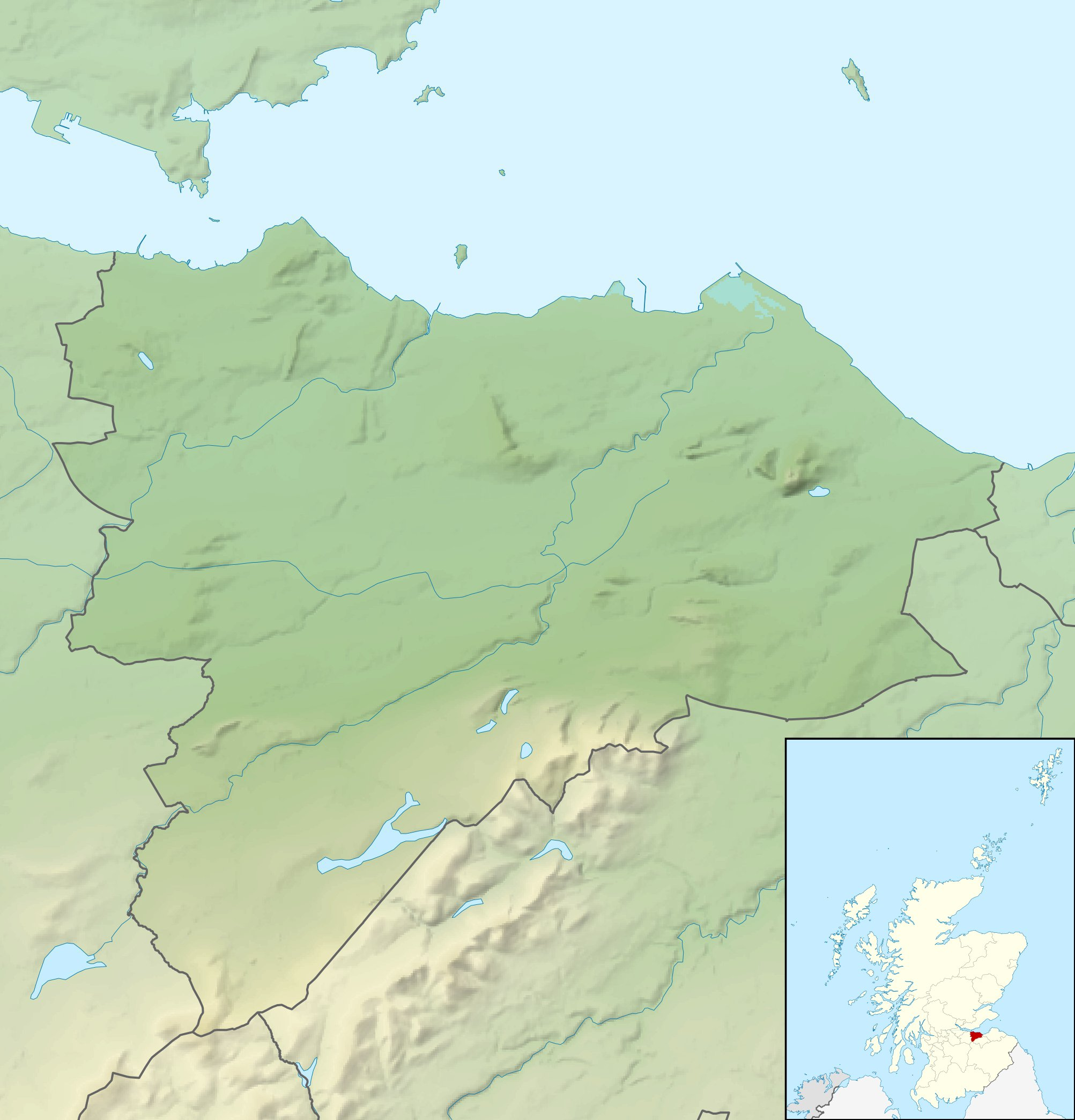
- Location within Edinburgh Location within the City of Edinburgh council area Location within Scotland
- Location: Edinburgh, Scotland
- OS grid: NT27537295
- Topo map: OS Landranger 66

Climbing
- Easiest route: hillwalking

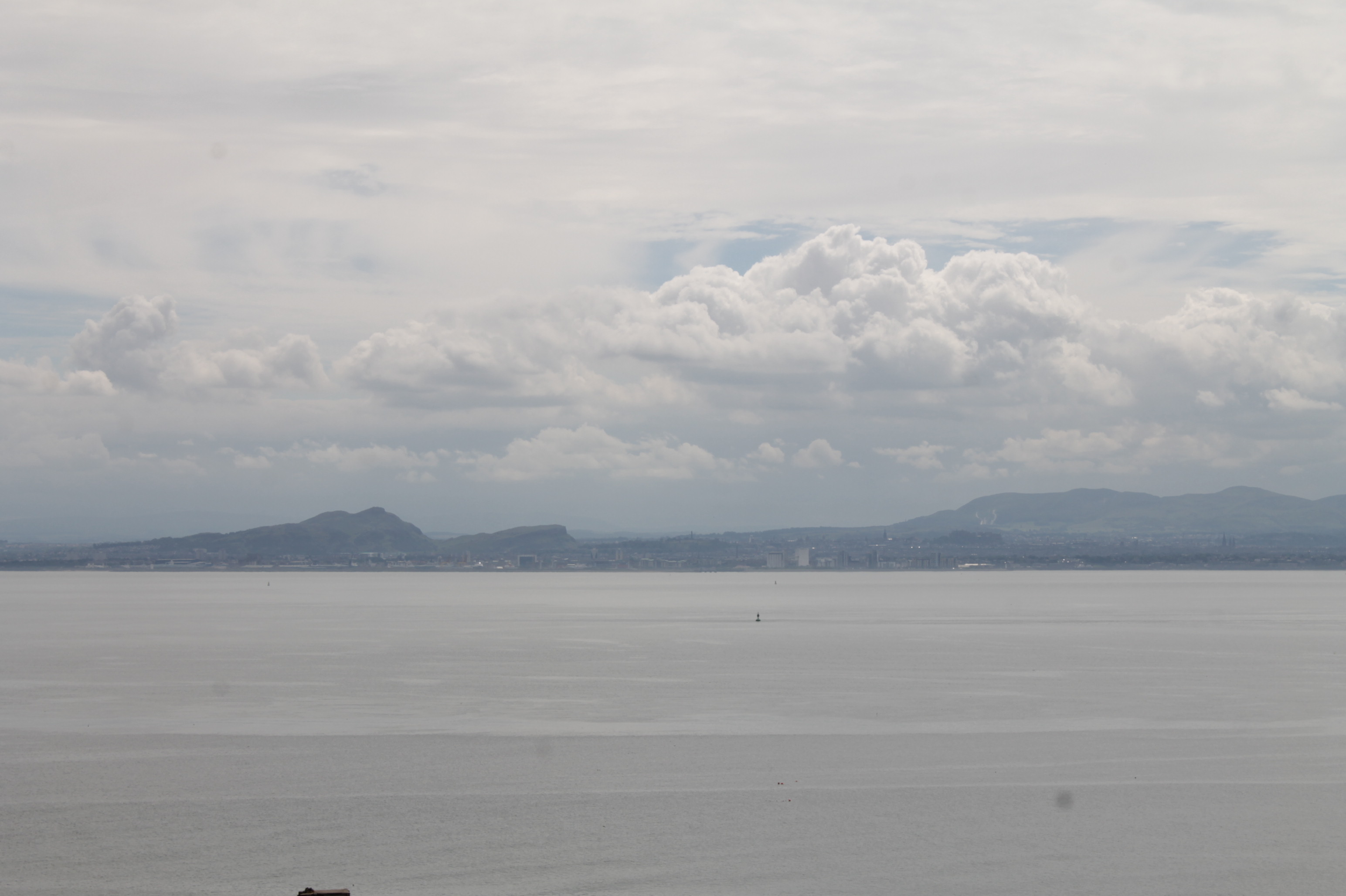
Arthur's Seat as seen over the Firth of Forth from Fife

Arthur's Seat (Scottish Gaelic: Suidhe Artair, pronounced [ˈs̪ɯi.əˈaɾt̪ʰəɾʲ]) is an ancient extinct volcano. It is the main peak of a group of hills in Edinburgh, Scotland, which form most of Holyrood Park. Robert Louis Stevenson described it as "a hill for magnitude, a mountain in virtue of its bold design". It is situated just to the east of the city centre, about 1 mile (1.6 km) to the east of Edinburgh Castle. The hill rises above the city to a height of 250.5 m (822 ft), provides panoramic views of the city and beyond, is relatively easy to climb, and is popular for hillwalking. Though it can be climbed from almost any direction, the easiest ascent is from the east, where a grassy slope rises above Dunsapie Loch. At a spur of the hill, Salisbury Crags has historically been a rock climbing venue with routes of various degrees of difficulty. Rock climbing was restricted to the South Quarry, but access was banned altogether in 2019 by Historic Environment Scotland.

== Name ==
An early name for Arthur's Seat, recorded in the charters of Holyrood Abbey, is Craggenmarf, sometimes simply the Crag. It is sometimes said that its name is derived from legends pertaining to King Arthur, such as the reference in Y Gododdin. Some support for this may be provided by several other hilltop and mountaintop features in Britain which bear the same or similar names, such as the peak of Ben Arthur (The Cobbler) in the western highlands, sometimes known as Arthur's Seat, and Arthur's Chair on the ridge called Stone Arthur in the English Lake District. The earliest record of an Arthurian name is from Walter Kennedy's The Flyting of Dunbar and Kennedie against William Dunbar in 1508 when it is called Arthurissete.

== Geology ==
Arthur's Seat is the largest of the three parts of the Arthur's Seat Volcano site of special scientific interest (the other parts being Calton Hill and the Castle Rock) which is designated to protect its important geology (see below), grassland habitats and uncommon plant and animal species.

Like the rock on which Edinburgh Castle is built, it was formed by a volcanic system of early Carboniferous age (lava samples have been dated at 341 to 335 million years old), which was eroded by a glacier moving from west to east during the Quaternary (approximately the last two million years), exposing rocky crags to the west and leaving a tail of material swept to the east. This is how the Salisbury Crags formed and became basalt cliffs between Arthur's Seat and the city centre. From some angles, Arthur's Seat resembles a lion couchant. Two of the several extinct vents make up the 'Lion's Head' and the 'Lion's Haunch'.

Aerial footage of Arthur's Seat and the George Square area of Edinburgh

Arthur's Seat and the Salisbury Crags adjoining it helped form the ideas of modern geology as it is currently understood. It was in these areas that James Hutton observed that the deposition of the sedimentary and formation of the igneous rocks must have occurred at different ages and in different ways than the thinking of that time said they did. It is possible to see a particular area known as Hutton's Section in the Salisbury Crags where the magma forced its way through the sedimentary rocks above it to form the dolerite sills that can be seen in the Section.

The hill bears a strong resemblance to the Cavehill in Belfast in terms of its geology and proximity to a major urban site.

== Human history ==
Panorama of Salisbury Crags and Arthur's Seat

A hill fort occupies the summit of Arthur's Seat and the subsidiary hill, Crow Hill.

Hill fort defences are visible round the main massif of Arthur's Seat at Dunsapie Hill and above Samson's Ribs, in the latter cases certainly of prehistoric date. These forts are likely to have been centres of power of the Votadini, who were the subject of the poem Y Gododdin, which is thought to have been written about 600 AD. Two stony banks on the east side of the hill represent the remains of an Iron Age hill-fort and a series of cultivation terraces are obvious above the road just beyond and best viewed from Duddingston.

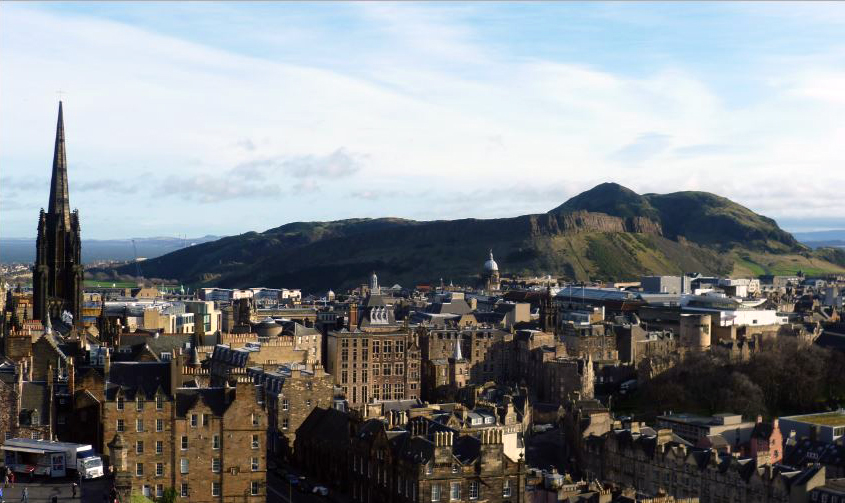
Arthur's Seat from Edinburgh Castle

On 1 May 1590, to celebrate the safe return of James VI of Scotland and Anne of Denmark, a bonfire was lit that night on the Salisbury Crags fuelled with ten loads of coal and six barrels of tar.

A track rising along the top of the slope immediately under Salisbury Crags has long been a popular walk, giving a view over the city. It became known as the Radical Road after it was paved in the aftermath of the Radical War of 1820, using the labour of unemployed weavers from the west of Scotland at the suggestion of Walter Scott as a form of work relief. This route has been closed since 2018 after 50 tons of rock fell from the cliffs above.

In 1836 five boys hunting for rabbits found a set of 17 miniature coffins containing small wooden figures in a cave on the crags of Arthur's Seat. The purpose has remained a mystery ever since the discovery. A strong contemporary belief was that they were made for witchcraft, though more recently it has been suggested that they might be connected with the murders committed by Burke and Hare in 1828. There were 16 known victims of the serial-killers plus the first person sold "to the doctors", namely a man who had died of natural causes. However, the murder victims were primarily female, while the eight surviving figures are male. Alternatively, the coffins may have represented the 16 bodies sold to the doctors, plus that of the final victim who remained unburied at the time of the duo's arrest, but was, as a destitute beggar, very likely dissected in any case. The surviving coffins are now displayed in Edinburgh's National Museum of Scotland.

The prominence of Arthur's Seat over Edinburgh has attracted various groups and has a particular significance to the history of the Church of Jesus Christ of Latter-day Saints, because this is where the nation of Scotland was dedicated in 1840 "for the preaching of the gospel". The apostle, Orson Pratt, arrived in Scotland in early 1850 and climbed the hill to pray to God for more converts.

In 1884, alpine mountain guide Emile Rey visited Edinburgh where he climbed Arthur's Seat, local tradition stating that before doing so he estimated it would take much of the day to reach the top. In 2021, Kashif Anwar killed his pregnant wife, Fawziyah Javed, by pushing her off of Arthur's Seat and causing her to fall to her death. He was sentenced to twenty years in prison.

In July 2026, a wildfire burned portions of Arthur's Seat.

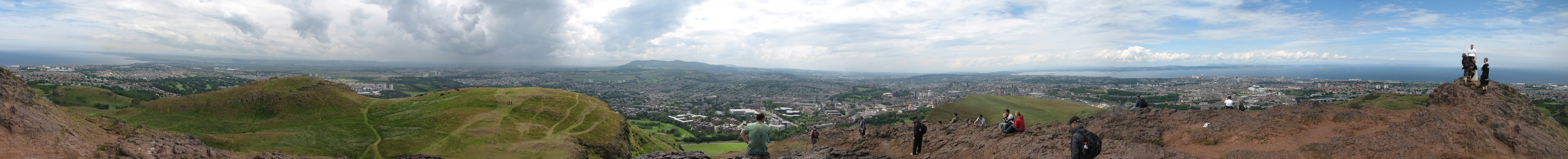
360-degree panorama from the peak of Arthur's Seat

== Mythology ==
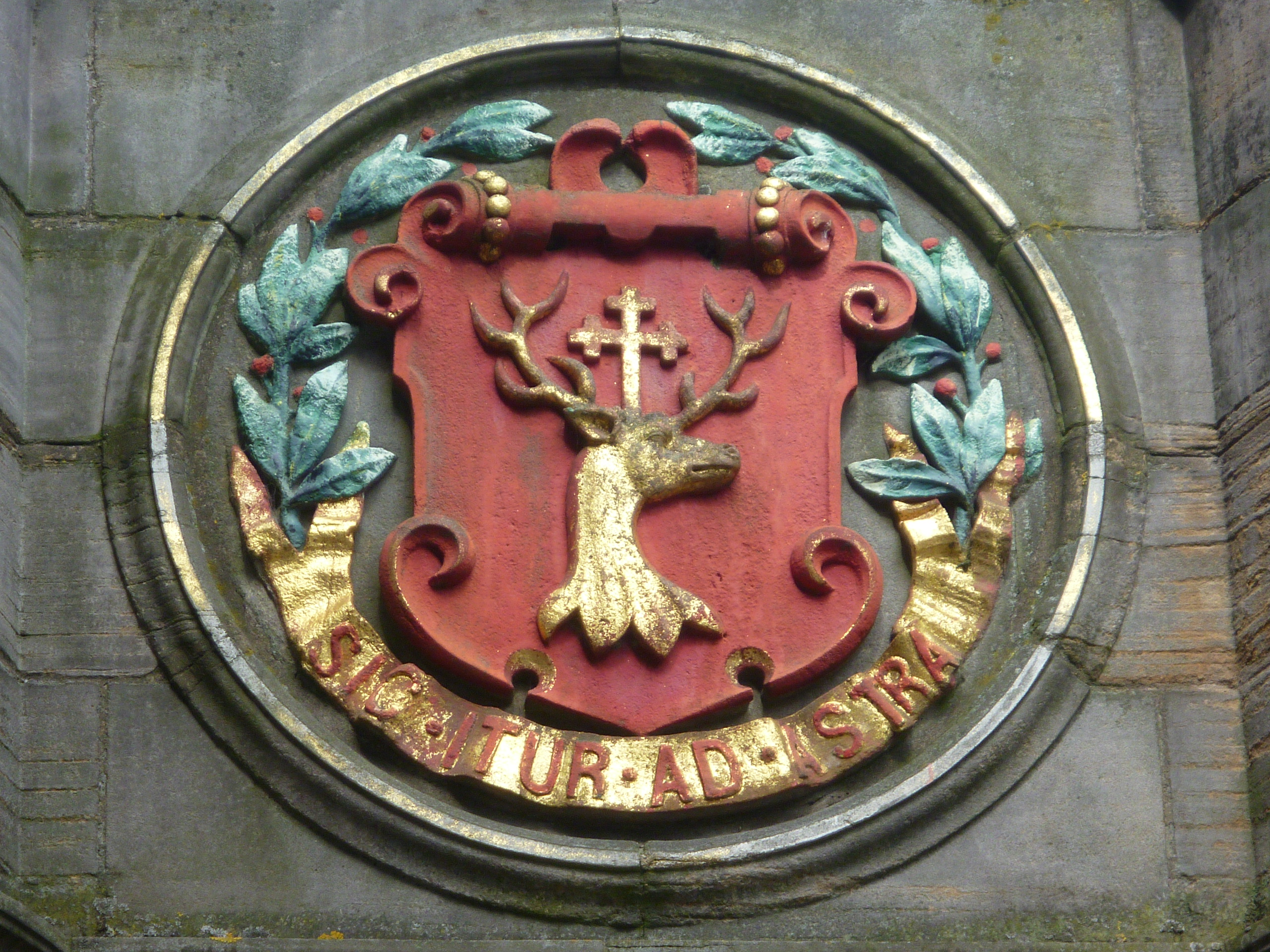
Burgh arms of the Canongate on the mercat cross of Edinburgh

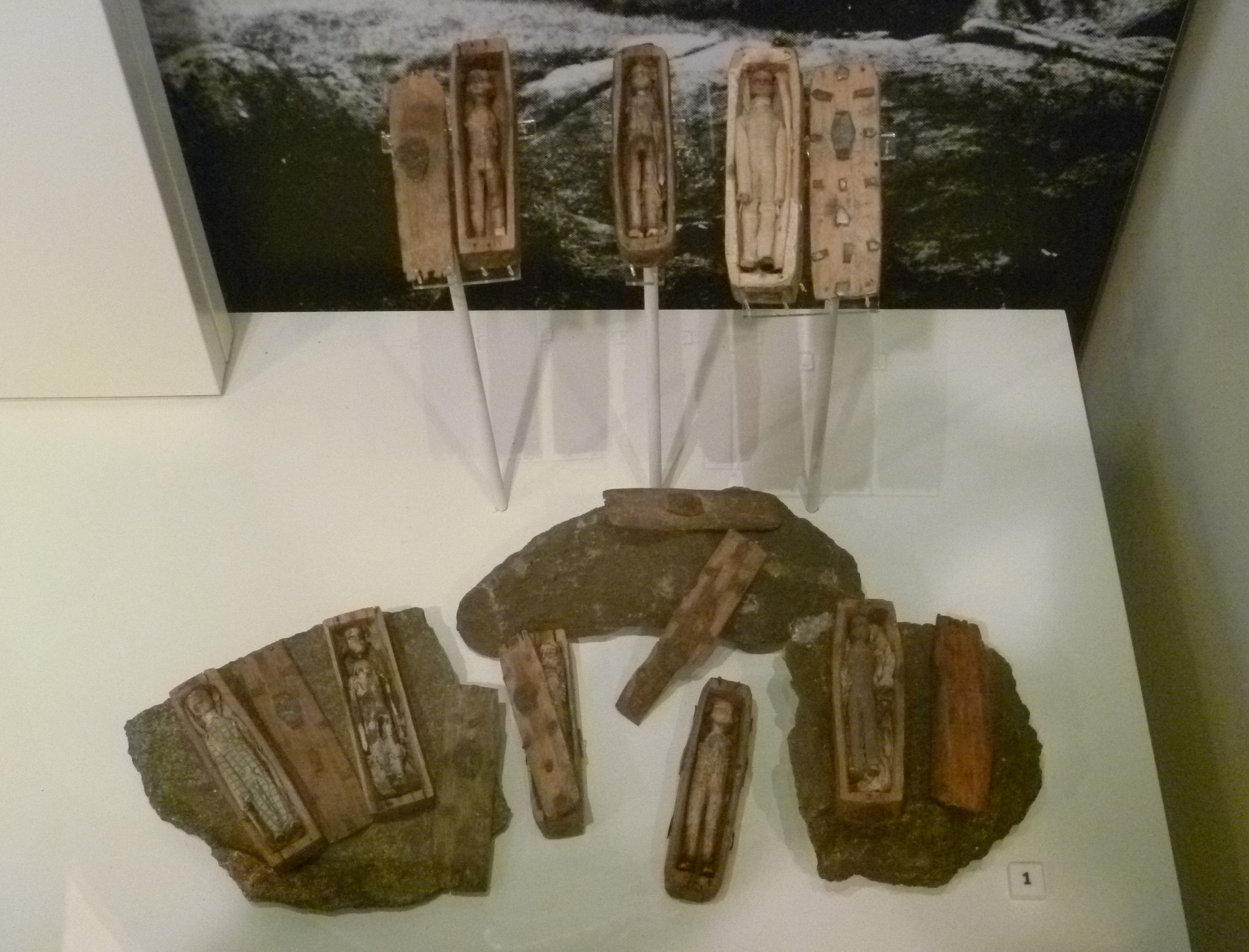
The mysterious Arthur's Seat coffins, found in 1836

Arthur's Seat is often mentioned as one of the possible locations for Camelot, the legendary castle and court of the Romano-British warrior-chief, King Arthur.

Tradition has it that it was at the foot of Arthur's Seat, covered by the forest of Drumselch, that Scotland's 12th-century king David I encountered a stag while out hunting. Having fallen from his horse and about to be gored, he had a vision of a cross appearing between the animal's antlers, before it inexplicably turned away, leaving him unharmed. David, believing his life had been spared through divine intervention, founded Holyrood Abbey on the spot. The burgh arms of the Canongate display the head of the stag with the cross framed by its antlers.

The slopes of the hill facing Holyrood are where young girls in Edinburgh traditionally bathe their faces in the dew on May Day to make themselves more beautiful. The poem "Caller Water" (fresh cool water), written by Robert Fergusson in 1773, contains the lines:

On May-day, in a fairy ring,
We've seen them round St Anthon's spring,
Frae grass the caller dew draps wring
To weet their een,
And water clear as crystal spring
To synd them clean

== See also ==
- Arthurs Seat, Victoria, hill in Australia named for its resemblance to the Edinburgh Arthur's Seat.
- Mountains and hills of Scotland
