= Murder of Arlene Fraser =

1998 Scottish murder victim

Arlene Fraser
- Born: 1965; Elgin, Moray, Scotland
- Died: 28 April 1998 (aged 33); Elgin, Moray, Scotland
- Known for: Victim of murder whose body was never found

Arlene Fraser was a 33-year-old woman from Elgin in Moray, Scotland, who vanished from her home on 28 April 1998 after her two children went to school. No trace of her was ever found, but her husband was convicted of her murder, upheld on appeal.

== Case ==
Though it was initially treated as a missing persons inquiry by Grampian Police, six months after Arlene's disappearance the senior detective in the case, Detective Chief Inspector Peter Simpson, said, "The only conclusion that's still left open to us, which I firmly believe has happened, is that something criminal has taken place here and that Arlene has been the victim of a crime. I am of the opinion that she's dead. There's no indication that she's living somewhere else."

At the time of her disappearance, her husband Nat Fraser was on bail for the attempted murder of his wife for an incident that occurred before she vanished, but at that early stage in the investigation police were satisfied with his alibi. This charge was later reduced to one of assault, although he was jailed for 18 months when convicted nearly two years later. Defence counsel Neil Murray said part of the delay in bringing the case to court was that a number of challenges were made under the European Convention on Human Rights, claiming that Fraser could not get a fair trial because of publicity. Fraser was also charged with perverting the course of justice in relation to police inquiries into a beige Ford Fiesta which they believed to be involved in Arlene Fraser's disappearance. The car had been purchased by a friend of Nat Fraser, Hector Dick, who also faced the same charges.

Dick had been due to appear at Elgin Sheriff Court in August 2000. However, the case was delayed and at the request of the defence moved, eventually being heard at Dingwall Sheriff Court in early-2001. On the fourth day of his trial, Dick changed his plea and pleaded guilty to a slightly lesser charge. He was subsequently jailed for one year, during which period he attempted to commit suicide by hanging himself.

Fraser was released from prison in April 2001 after serving half his sentence but was jailed again four months later after admitting to lying in order to receive almost £19,000 in Legal Aid funding. In June 2001, a third man, Glenn Lucas, was charged with perverting the course of justice in relation to the case. Finally, on 26 April 2002, it was announced by the Crown Office that Fraser, Dick, and Lucas had been indicted for the murder of Arlene Fraser, with each being charged with conspiring to murder her, murdering her and attempting to defeat the ends of justice.

== First trial ==
During the trial in January 2003, it was announced that the Crown would not be proceeding with the charges against Dick and Lucas. Advocate depute Alan Turnbull, prosecuting, told the court that he intended to call Dick as a witness against Nat Fraser. The trial was then adjourned with the judge Lord Mackay explaining that there would be a delay before the trial could continue as Fraser's defence team would have a right to interview Dick and Lucas – something which could not be done while the two men were still facing charges. Dick then appeared as a witness for the prosecution and admitted burning and crushing the Ford Fiesta police had been looking for because he feared that it might be linked to the disappearance of Arlene Fraser. He claimed in evidence that Fraser told him he had arranged for his estranged wife to be killed and then disposed of her body by grinding it up and burying it. He denied any involvement at all in the disappearance of Arlene.

As the trial progressed the Crown dropped three charges of attempting to defeat the ends of justice against Fraser, leaving him to face the sole charge of murder "with others unknown". Fraser had lodged a special defence of alibi, claiming he was carrying out deliveries for his fruit and vegetable business on the day his wife vanished, a claim supported by an employee who was with him on the day.

On 29 January 2003, Nat Fraser was found guilty of the murder of his wife. Judge Lord Mackay described the 44-year-old as "evil" before sentencing him to life imprisonment, with a recommendation to serve a minimum of 25 years. Fraser collapsed as the judge passed the sentence. His defence team immediately stated an intention to appeal. The case was described as the largest investigation Grampian Police had ever carried out but the absence of a body and any forensic evidence always hampered the inquiry.

The appeal against conviction was lodged in December 2003, and in May the following year, the Court of Criminal Appeal granted leave for him to do so. On 19 October 2005 the BBC broadcast "Arlene Fraser Murder Trial: The Missing Evidence" which claimed that Dick had lied during the trial. The following year, in March 2006 two inquiries were announced after claims that relevant evidence was not made available to the original trial. Lord Advocate Colin Boyd stated that it was "a matter of serious concern" that the information had not been given to lawyers for Fraser. A Crown Office statement said "The lord advocate regards it as a matter of serious concern that this evidence was not made available to the defence prior to the trial. For that reason, the area procurator fiscal for Glasgow, Catherine Dyer, has now been asked to conduct a full investigation into this matter." Grampian Police asked the Association of Chief Police Officers in Scotland (ACPOS) to investigate its handling of relevant information and evidence.That inquiry was to be carried out by a team from Strathclyde Police, headed by Deputy Chief Constable Ricky Gray.

In May 2006, Fraser was released from prison pending the outcome of his appeal. Shortly after fresh allegations about the case appeared in the press, prompting Arlene's family to call for Fraser to be returned to prison, though this did not happen. The case went to appeal in November 2007 with claims that the prosecution in the original case had withheld evidence, and that police officers had lied. In early December, Fraser was returned to prison pending the outcome of the appeal which was announced on 6 May 2008. The Lord Justice Clerk, Lord Gill, sitting with Lord Osborne and Lord Johnston refused the appeal. As he was led from court Fraser told waiting reporters "The fight will go on, as will the fight to get to the truth." In October of that year, he announced that he intended to apply for leave to appeal to the Privy Council in London, the hearing to take place in the High Court in Edinburgh. Leave to appeal to the Privy Council was refused. A further appeal in November 2009 contended that earlier appeal hearings were not fair under human rights legislation. That appeal too was refused in January 2010. There were no further routes of appeal in the Scottish Courts, and in May 2010, Fraser announced an intention to appeal in the Supreme Court in London having been given special leave to do so. In May 2011, Fraser won his appeal. Allowing it, the Supreme Court judges said in their deliberations: "The Supreme Court unanimously allows the appeal. It remits the case to a differently constituted Appeal Court to consider whether to grant authority for a new prosecution and then, having considered that point, to quash the conviction." The Crown Office immediately said it would seek to bring fresh proceedings against Fraser, whilst in a statement, Arlene Fraser's family said: "Today's decision by the Supreme Court is bitterly disappointing. We accept today's decision. However, we fully support the Crown's intention to seek authority to bring fresh proceedings against Nat Fraser for Arlene's murder."

== Second trial ==
In 2012, Fraser went on trial again in the High Court in Edinburgh, before judge Lord Bracadale with advocate depute Alex Prentice leading for the prosecution. On 30 May, he was again found guilty by a majority verdict of Arlene's murder and sentenced to a minimum seventeen years imprisonment. Hector Dick again gave evidence against Fraser. John Scott, defending, said the case was "blighted by hindsight and assumption", and argued much of the Crown evidence was "unreliable". During cross-examination, Scott suggested that Dick had been responsible for the murder of Arlene Fraser, an allegation he denied.

Following the verdict, Lord Bracadale told Fraser: "The evidence indicated that at some point you arranged for someone to kill your wife, Arlene, and dispose of her body. Thus you instigated in cold blood the pre-meditated murder of your wife and mother of your children, then aged 10 and five years. The murder and disposal of the body must have been carried out with ruthless efficiency, for there is not a trace of Arlene Fraser from that day to this and her bereft family continue to live with no satisfactory knowledge of what happened to her remains".

== Television documentary ==
The second trial was the subject of a television documentary "The Murder Trial", which was shown on Channel 4 on 9 July 2013, only the second time that footage from a British murder trial was broadcast on television. The documentary won the award for the best single documentary at the 2014 British Academy Television Awards.

== 2013 appeal ==
In October 2013 an appeal against conviction by Fraser was refused.

== See also ==
- List of murder convictions without a body
- List of solved missing person cases
