= Crown Court (Recording and Broadcasting) Order 2020 =

- Statutory Instrument
- Parliament of the United Kingdom
- Citation: SI 2020/637

Dates
- Made: 19 June 2020
- Laid before Parliament: 20 June 2020

Other legislation
- Made under: Crime and Courts Act 2013

Text of the Crown Court (Recording and Broadcasting) Order 2020 as in force today (including any amendments) within the United Kingdom, from legislation.gov.uk.

The Crown Court (Recording and Broadcasting) Order 2020 (SI 2020/637) is a statutory instrument of the Parliament of the United Kingdom. The order allows for the filming of the sentencing phase of trials held at the Crown Court in England and Wales. The filming of criminal proceedings was given approval in 2020, but implementation was delayed until 2022 because of the onset of the COVID-19 pandemic.

== Background ==
The recording of sound or images in English courts had been banned by the Criminal Justice Act 1925. In 2013, it was relaxed and certain Court of Appeal cases were allowed to be recorded or filmed. Since 2018, some cases had been streamed online.

Several media organisations, including BBC News, ITN and Sky News had campaigned to have the law relaxed for over 20 years. A representative from the Ministry of Justice said they hoped a public assessment of judge's decisions would allow the public to understand them in more depth. However, some barristers raised concerns that this could allow the court to become a "spectator sport". The act was first used for the sentencing of Ben Oliver for manslaughter in June 2022.

== Applicable cases ==
The act only allows filming and broadcasting of the sentencing in a court case. It is still illegal to film or broadcast any other part of the case, including testimonies by witnesses, victims or jurors.
