= History of the Scottish Socialist Party =

Aspect of Scottish political history

In Scotland, the Scottish Socialist Party (SSP) is a left-wing political party. The party was formed in 1998 from an alliance of left-wing organisations in Scotland. In 1999, it saw its first MSP returned to Holyrood, with five more MSPs elected in 2003. It lost all MSPs in the 2007 elections and has lacked representation in the Scottish Parliament ever since.

== Early years (1996–1998) ==
The forerunner of the SSP was the Scottish Socialist Alliance (SSA), a coalition of left-wing bodies in Scotland formed in 1996. Around 400 people attended the SSA's launch rally in Glasgow in February 1996, which attracted socialists and communists from various party backgrounds. The largest group involved was Scottish Militant Labour.

The first election fought by the SSA was the Toryglen by-election for Glasgow City Council in August 1996, with Rosie Kane as the candidate, where it won a respectable 18% of the vote. The SSA went on to contest 16 seats in Scotland at the 1997 general election, including all ten Glasgow seats, Edinburgh North and Leith, and both Dundee seats. Tommy Sheridan saved his deposit in Glasgow Pollok, and Jim McVicar and Alan McCombes picked up a significant vote in Glasgow Baillieston and Glasgow Govan respectively.

The SSA's electoral stance was that there needed to be a left-wing alternative to New Labour and the SNP, and the SSA felt that the experience had been enough of a success to go on to form the Scottish Socialist Party (SSP) in 1998, with Tommy Sheridan as its convenor, in advance of the 1999 Scottish Parliament election.

== Formation and growth of the SSP ==
The SSP contested the by-election for the European Parliament constituent of North East Scotland that took place in November 1998.

=== 1999 Scottish Parliament election ===
In April 1999 the SSP announced their manifesto for the first elections to the devolved Scottish Parliament. Despite only having a party membership of around 1,200 the SSP contested all the regions, with the party's National Convenor Tommy Sheridan the top-placed on their Glasgow regional list. Sheridan was elected, becoming their first MSP.

The period following the election of Scotland's only socialist MSP saw sustained growth for the SSP. During this period of sustained and rapid growth, it recruited extensively from former members of the Labour Party and the Scottish National Party, in addition to trade unionists, environmentalists, and community campaigners. It also achieved what was, for a minor party, a respectable vote at the 2001 general election and a series of by-elections for the UK and Scottish parliaments (Hamilton South, Ayr, Glasgow Anniesland, and Falkirk West).

=== 2003 Scottish Parliament election ===
The 2003 elections to the Scottish Parliament took place shortly after the decision of the UK parliament to invade Iraq and the 2002-2003 UK firefighter dispute. The SSP had been active in the anti-war movement and the firefighters' dispute, and fielded candidates in all seats. They gained five additional regional list MSPs across Scotland: Frances Curran; Rosie Kane; Carolyn Leckie; Colin Fox; and Rosemary Byrne.

The party had a boost when the Scottish section of the National Union of Rail, Maritime and Transport Workers (RMT) affiliated with them, breaking their historical association with Labour.

Campbell Martin, a former SNP MSP who had become an independent, came fairly close to joining the SSP. The party did, however, recruit John McAllion, a former Labour MSP who lost his seat at the 2003 election. He stood for the SSP in the 2006 Dunfermline and West Fife by-election, but gained only 537 votes (1.6%).

== Crisis and split ==
On 11 November 2004, Tommy Sheridan resigned as convener of the Scottish Socialist Party, citing personal reasons. It later emerged that he had been pressured into resignation by the party's National Executive because he intended to sue a national tabloid newspaper over stories he knew to be true. Colin Fox was elected to replace him at the party's 2005 leadership election.

By early August 2006, Sheridan was looking to become leader of the Scottish Socialist Party again— but on 29 August 2006, before the election had taken place, Sheridan announced his intention to leave and found a new political party which he called Solidarity. His move was supported by Rosemary Byrne MSP. Sheridan hoped his splinter group would attract as many as 700 SSP members.

The SSP met immediately before the split at a national rally on 2 September 2006, at which Fox said "the vast majority of SSP members" had not been persuaded of the need for a new party. As a result of the split, the party's national conference was brought forward from the following Spring to that October, and all of the party positions went up for election. All of the incumbents were re-elected, including Colin Fox as National Convener.

In October 2006 the RMT withdrew their support.

At the 2007 Scottish Parliament election, the SSP hemorrhaged votes while Solidarity failed to win a seat. At the local elections that year, the SSP retained one councillor, Jim Bollan, who was re-elected in West Dunbartonshire.

== Scottish referendum campaign ==
Following the 2011 elections to the Scottish Parliament and the resulting SNP majority, the Scottish Government announced its intent to hold an independence referendum in 2014. In May 2012, a cross-party organisation called Yes Scotland was established to campaign for a Yes vote. The SSP's national co-spokesperson, Colin Fox, was invited to sit on its advisory board, reflecting the party's crucial support for independence over the past fifteen years. This was done at the insistence of Yes Scotland's non-partisan chief executive, Blair Jenkins, in the face of SNP opposition. During the referendum campaign, the party continued to campaign on other issues including the bedroom tax, fuel poverty, equal marriage, and the latest Israel-Gaza conflict.

On 11 September 2013, the SSP launched a pamphlet called The Case for an Independent Socialist Scotland, the publication of which has been welcomed by MSPs. It has become the party's fastest-selling pamphlet ever. A launch event was held in the Scottish Parliament, hosted by Independent MSP John Finnie, and subsequent launch events took place in Paisley and Aberdeen. In June 2014, the party published another pamphlet outlining its case for "a modern democratic republic". In response to the publication of Scotland's Future, the party issued a statement which said the Scottish Government's document had set out a vision that represents "very significant advance for the people of Scotland", but reaffirmed the SSP's commitment to a socialist Scotland.

As part of the party's campaign for independence, it held dozens of public meetings across Scotland with a range of speakers. The party's final meeting, scheduled to take place in Drumchapel Community Centre, was cancelled after unionist protests. In the aftermath, Richie Venton said: "Those demonstrating may have learned that their support for a Westminster regime was impoverishing themselves and their communities. But what they should know is we shall continue to fight against austerity and the tyranny of the Tories over communities like Drumchapel, Govan, Easterhouse and indeed, Scotland."

In an interview with the Sunday Herald in late August 2014, Colin Fox said: "The SSP has brought a proletarian sense to Yes Scotland and reminded people the decisive issue is whether people think they're going to be better off. It's not the currency, it's not the EU, it's not those highfalutin' chattering class issues." He said that the party brought "a sense of the schemes, the workplaces, the unions" to the campaign.

== The SSP after the referendum ==
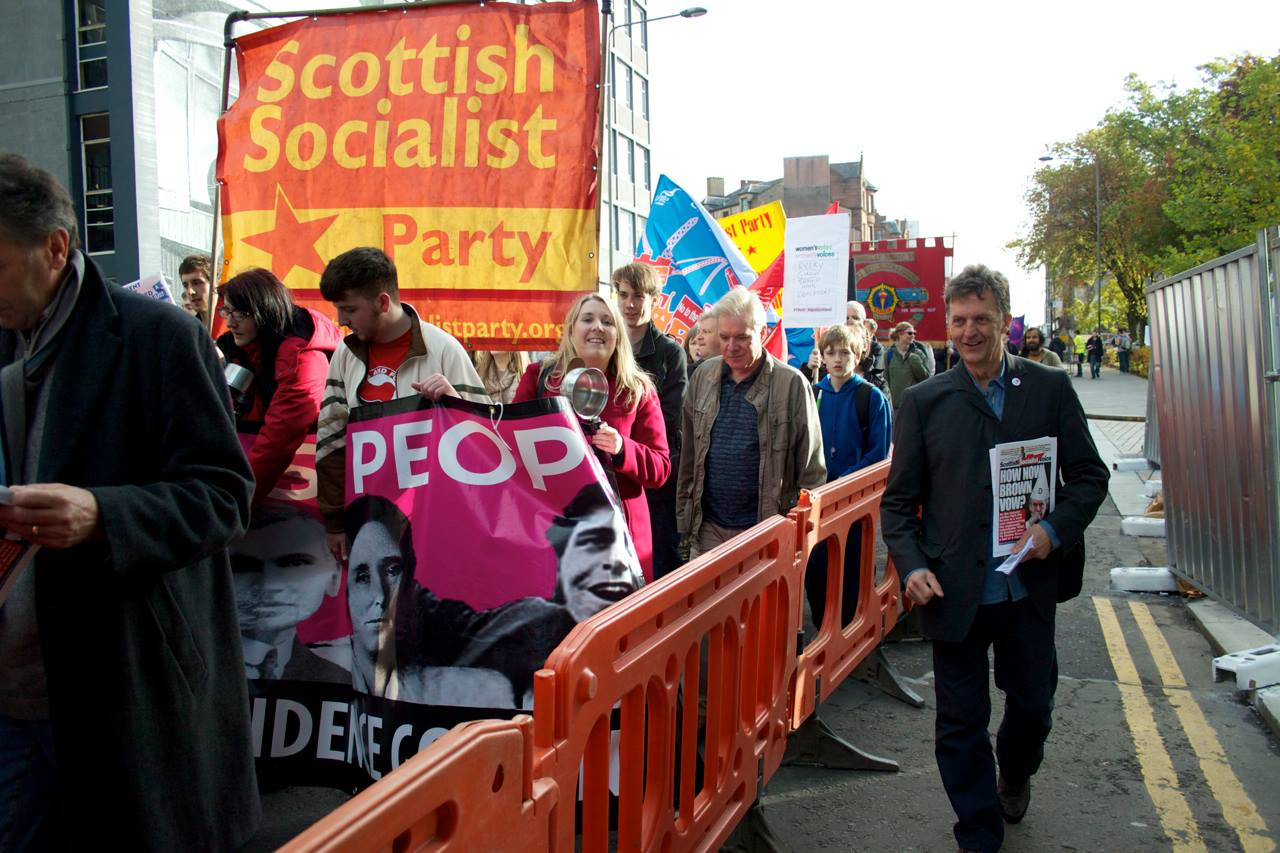
Richie Venton (right) in Glasgow, 18 October 2014

After the announcement of the referendum result, the SSP was amongst the political parties that reported significant increases in the size of their membership. As of 23 September, more than 2,100 people had joined the party since the referendum result was declared. As a result, new branches were established across the country.

When the make-up of the Smith Commission was announced, Colin Fox protested the decision to "uniquely exclude" the SSP from proceedings. He wrote to the Smith Commission: "The argument some use to justify our exclusion on the grounds that we currently have no 'parliamentary representation' fails to appreciate that the referendum was not a parliamentary process but an unprecedented public debate that resulted in an extraordinary level of engagement from all sections of society. To exclude the SSP is to exclude an important constituency of opinion in Scottish society."

The SSP's 2014 National Conference took place in Edinburgh on 25 October and the party reported it had been better attended than the preceding several years and that their membership had trebled during the weeks following the referendum. It was the first SSP conference to be streamed live over the Internet.
