= List of Scottish Socialist Party members of the Scottish Parliament =

This is a list of Scottish Socialist Party MSPs. It includes all members of the Scottish Parliament (MSPs) who have sat as Scottish Socialist Party (SSP) members of the Scottish Parliament.

A total of six people have served as SSP MPs. Tommy Sheridan was elected at the 1999 Scottish Parliament election, and five more SSP MSP were elected at the 2003 election. Two of the MSPs left the party in August 2006, and all six MSPs were defeated at the May 2007 Scottish Parliament election.

== List of MSPs ==
Name	Constituency or region	Type	Start year	End year	Reason
Rosemary Byrne	South of Scotland	Region	2003	2006	Left the SSP (Note: Rosemary Byrne and Tommy Sheridan both reigned from the SSP in August 2006. In September 2006 they launched the new Solidarity party.)
Frances Curran	West of Scotland	Region	2003	2007	Defeated
Colin Fox	Lothians	Region	2003	2007	Defeated
Rosie Kane	Glasgow	Region	2003	2007	Defeated
Carolyn Leckie	Central Scotland	Region	2003	2007	Defeated
Tommy Sheridan	Glasgow	Region	1999	2006	Left the SSP
