= 2005 Scottish Socialist Party leadership election =

Scottish Socialist Party leadership election
- 13 February 2005
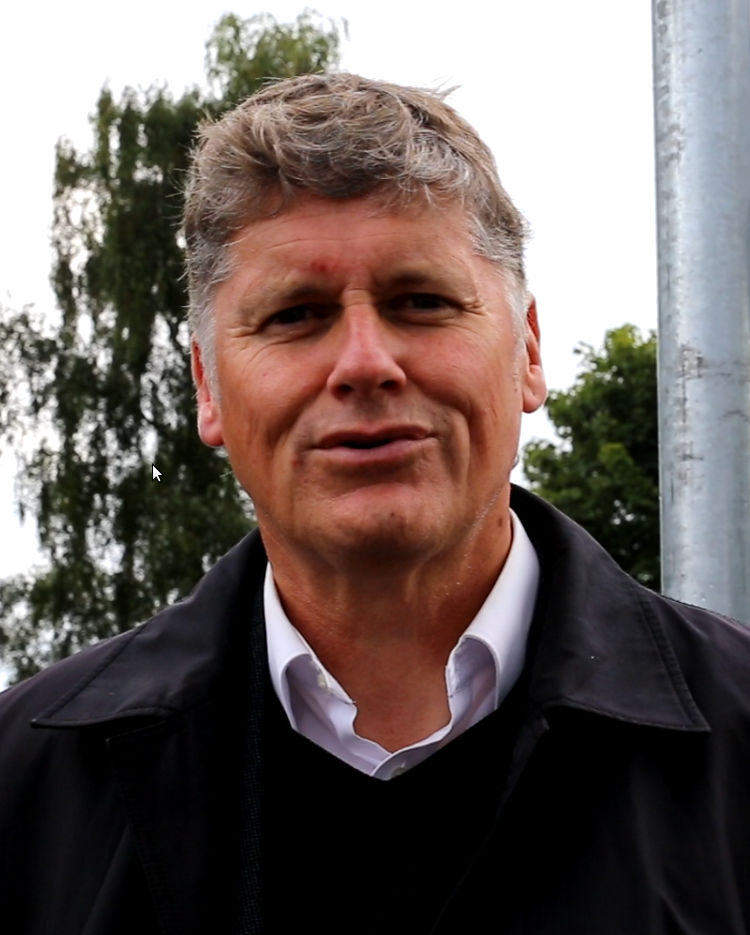

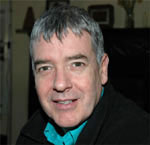
Candidate	Colin Fox	Alan McCombes
Popular vote	252	154
Percentage	60.7%	37.1%

The 2005 Scottish Socialist Party leadership election was triggered by the resignation of Tommy Sheridan in November 2004. After a period of collective rule, an election was held at the party's Perth conference in February 2005 to find a new National Convener. It resulted in the election of Colin Fox as Sheridan's successor.

== Candidates ==
Any member of the Scottish Socialist Party was eligible to stand in the election. Nominations were to be accepted until the first week in December, though this deadline eventually became 23 January 2005. Two candidates contested the election.

Fox announced his intention to stand for the position shortly after Sheridan's resignation, saying he was "prepared to step up to the plate and offer my services to the party for consideration as the national spokesperson". His sole opponent, McCombes, announced his candidacy five days before nominations closed. McCombes joined the race in order to avoid the "coronation" of an unopposed candidate. Carolyn Leckie was, for a time, thought likely to stand but did not.

== Campaign ==
Sheridan initially refused to name his preferred successor, but later emerged as one of Fox's backers. Fox was supported by two of the party's other MSPs—Sheridan and Rosemary Byrne—while McCombes was backed by three: Rosie Kane, Carolyn Leckie, and Frances Curran.

In the grassroots membership, Fox found greater support in the east of Scotland and McCombes found greater support in the west. Fox had been a full-time organiser for the party in the Lothians for five years before his election in 2003, and said those who had voted for McCombes were based "principally in Glasgow".

A principal issue in the election was whether or not the party should be led by an MSP. The Scotsman reported: "There is little separating [Fox and McCombes] ideologically, so the contest is largely a matter of style and personality. And one of the key issues has become whether the SSP should be led from inside the Scottish Parliament or outside." McCombes said he wanted the party to engage with non-voters who had "been abandoned by the political elites", and argued that he was "a real political heavyweight, capable of standing up to big beasts of the jungle like Alex Salmond, Charles Kennedy and John Reid".

Fox argued that "electing a non-MSP as convener would make the job ten times more difficult" and that he didn't think McCombes "would get invited to many meetings because he wouldn't be an elected representative".

== Process ==
The party formally decided to end collective rule and proceed with the election in a National Council meeting in December 2004, at which there was "a full and frank discussion on the options for the leadership". Regardless, the question was revisited at the party conference, which discussed four options for governing the party:

- Continuing with collective leadership by MSPs
- Collective leadership by another group of 5-6 people
- Election of two co-conveners
- Election of a single convener

The conference eventually voted through a motion proposing the establishment of a commission to "investigate the existing structures, organisation, culture and constitution of the party", then proceeded with the election of a single convener. Delegates were invited to cast a vote for either of the nominated candidates. There were 406 votes cast for either Fox or McCombes, with a total of 9 abstentions and 1 spoilt ballot. Fox won by a majority of 98, despite speculation that the vote would be close.

== Aftermath ==
After his election, Fox said the party would "unite and focus on regaining the confidence of the 130,000 people who voted for us in the 2003 election". He also said he would ensure no division between the party's MSPs and its grassroots activists, saying: "I want to go to those who voted for Alan, principally in Glasgow, and reassure them that rank-and-file democracy is safe in my hands."

Sheridan said he would strive to "unify the party behind Colin's convenership", and said Fox's 98 vote majority "makes it all the more likely that this party will now get back to what it is good at, which is fighting the Tories, fighting capitalism, fighting wars, instead of having internal squabbles". By August 2006, however, Sheridan began manoeuvring to retake the party leadership and said he had absolutely no confidence in Fox, who lacked the "steel" to lead the SSP out of its present crisis. Sheridan eventually formed a splinter organisation and left the SSP before another leadership contest could take place.
