= Sandra Webster =

Scottish Socialist Party spokesperson

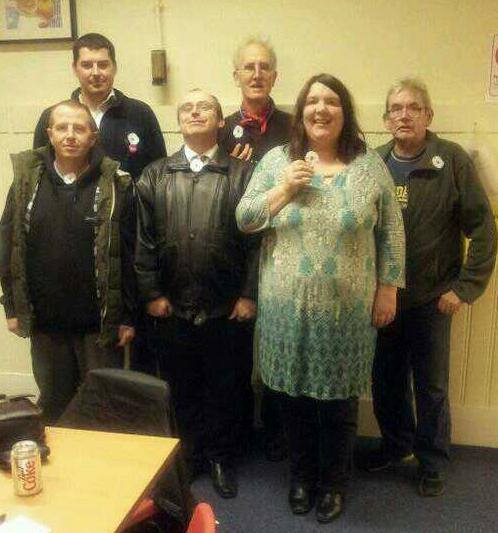
- With Renfrewshire SSP members in 2013

Scottish Socialist Party co-spokesperson
- In office 2013–2016

Personal details
- Born: Dundee, Scotland
- Party: Scottish Socialist Party
- Known for: Political activism

Sandra Amelia Webster is a former national co-spokesperson of the Scottish Socialist Party (SSP). Describing herself as a socialist, feminist, and republican, she is an active campaigner for Scottish independence, nuclear disarmament, carers' rights, and autism care and support services.

== Personal life ==
Sandra Webster grew up in the Dryburgh housing estate in Dundee, where she lived next door to Ernie Ross, before moving to Paisley in her 20s. She has two sons with autism. In 2011, she took part in the National Theatre of Scotland's Five Minute Theatre project, writing a play inspired by the experience of bringing up her two autistic sons. Rosie Kane, a former SSP MSP, played the role of one of the mothers in the show.

== Political activism ==
Sandra spoke at the Radical Independence Conference in 2012 on the role of art and culture in changing society.

In November 2013, Webster addressed the STUC's disabled workers' conference in Dundee and called for the rights of disabled people to be enshrined in a written constitution in an independent Scotland. She had previously called for carers' voices to be heard during the independence referendum campaign and for carers to be "recognised for the £10 billion we contribute to the Scottish economy".

Sandra Webster was re-elected as SSP co-spokesperson alongside Colin Fox at the 2014 SSP conference.

She stood at a general election for the first time at the 2015 UK general election, as the official SSP candidate in Paisley and Renfrewshire South. During the election campaign, she campaigned to ban zero-hour contracts, saying they "exploit workers and attack their employment rights". Explaining her decision to stand, she said the SSP "offer an alternative to the austerity that other political parties promise to deliver" and the party is "proud to represent all of the working class not just those who are in work". She said she is "possibly the only candidate" in the constituency who has been directly impacted by cuts to public services and is "standing for something real rather than it being an academic exercise". On International Women’s Day on an article published by the Scottish Socialist Party, she claims to have stood by and been most passionate about protecting vulnerable disadvantaged women, such as those with disabilities, carers and women on benefits.

She was the no. 2 candidate in the West regional list for RISE - Scotland's Left Alliance at the 2016 Scottish Parliament election.

In 2016, she stood down as joint national spokesperson.

She was a candidate for the SSP in the Paisley South East ward in Renfrewshire at the 2022 Scottish local elections.

In March 2023 she was re-elected to the SSP executive committee.
