= Róisín Urquhart =

Scottish socialist

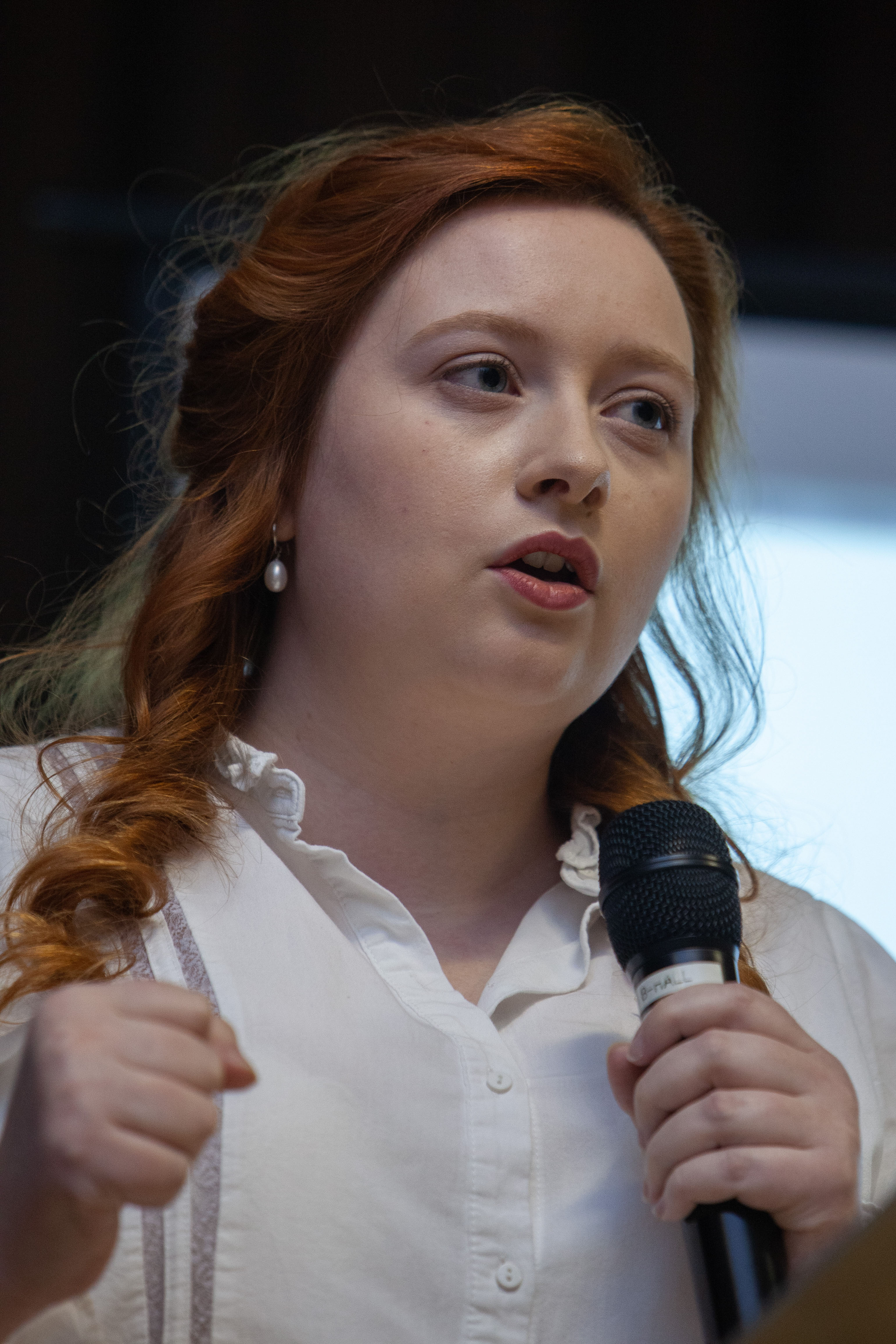
- Róisín McLaren in November 2018

National co-spokesperson of the Scottish Socialist Party
- In office 10 November 2018 – 2021
- Succeeded by: Natalie Reid

Personal details
- Born: Róisín Mary Bridget McLaren; 12 October 1994 (age 31) Edinburgh, Scotland
- Party: Scottish Socialist Party
- Education: Scotland's Rural College

Róisín Mary Bridget Urquhart (nee McLaren) (born 12 October 1994) is a former Scottish politician, who was a national co-spokesperson of the Scottish Socialist Party (SSP) from 2018 to 2021.

== Personal life ==
McLaren was born in Edinburgh before moving to Livingston and then West Calder, where she spent most of her childhood. Her great grandfather was a shale miner and a member of the Independent Labour Party in West Calder. Her father was a member of the Communist Party of Great Britain and later Democratic Left Scotland. Her mother is a former member of the Socialist Workers Party. Her family were activists for a "Yes, Yes" vote in the 1979 referendum on Scottish devolution.

McLaren attended St Kentigern's Academy in Blackburn, before receiving a “foundationer” place at George Heriot’s School. She went on to study Sustainable Environmental Management at Scotland's Rural College.

McLaren has an interest in falconry.

== Political career ==
In 2013, she joined Edinburgh University Scottish Nationalist Association and became the society's president. McLaren was a prominent organiser of the Yes campaign on Edinburgh University campus. In 2014, she took part in campus debate on independence, urging the audience to use the momentum for the Yes campaign to "create a socially responsible country for future generations to come".

McLaren joined the Scottish Socialist Party in 2017. She attended the Scottish Independence Convention conference "Build: Bridges to Indy" and, interviewed there for the Scottish Socialist Voice, said that: "if independence is about anything, it has to be about improving the lives of working class people."

On 2 June 2018, McLaren chaired a session at the Connolly150 conference - an international conference on James Connolly - which brought together speakers from across the world to discuss and celebrate James Connolly's life and ideas.

In November 2017, McLaren wrote to the Guardian to highlight the issue of zero-hours contracts and the SSP's policy of a £10 minimum wage.

In December 2017, McLaren wrote a joint article with the current SSP National Secretary Hugh Cullen, on radical pro-independence blog Conter which emphasised the need for an organised pro-independence socialist party.

On 10 November 2018, McLaren was elected national co-spokesperson of the Scottish Socialist Party, beating Frances Curran. McLaren was re-elected against Curran again at the 2019 National Conference.

She was appointed to lead the SSP's climate change action group.

At the 2021 SSP conference she stood down from the SSP executive, because of work and family commitments. She was replaced as female national spokesperson by Natalie Reid.
