= Colin Fox =

Colin Fox is the name of:

- Colin Fox (actor) (1938–2025), Canadian actor
- Colin Fox (politician) (born 1959), Scottish politician
