= Rosie Kane =

Scottish politician (born 1961)

Member of the Scottish Parliament for Glasgow
- In office 1 May 2003 – 2 April 2007

Personal details
- Born: Rosemary McGarvey; 5 June 1961 (age 65)
- Party: Scottish Socialist Party
- Spouse: Divorced 1998. Married 2019.
- Children: Two daughters and three step children.

Rosemary Kane (née McGarvey; born 5 June 1961) is a Scottish Socialist Party politician. She was a Member of the Scottish Parliament (MSP) for the Glasgow Region from 2003 to 2007.

== Political history ==
=== Introduction to politics ===
Kane entered politics after becoming involved in a campaign against the extension of the M77 motorway. In 1996 she was the first ever candidate of the newly formed Scottish Socialist Alliance when she contested a Glasgow City Council by-election in the Toryglen ward, an area threatened by the M74 extension plan, and came third with 18% of the vote. After this she was an election candidate a number of times for the Scottish Socialist Alliance and its successor the Scottish Socialist Party. She served on the National Executive committee of the party for a number of years and as the party's environmental spokesperson, writing a column "One World" for the Scottish Socialist Voice.

=== Parliamentary work (2003–2007) ===
Kane stood for election to the Scottish Parliament in 2003, and was placed second on the party's list in Glasgow region. She was elected alongside Tommy Sheridan, who was first on the list. In her victory speech, she stated how she planned to shake up the Parliament, stating "They're going to be amazed at all the madness and craziness that's going to happen in there".

MSPs are required to swear an oath of allegiance to the Queen before they can take their seat in Parliament. As the Scottish Socialist Party is a republican party, their MSPs held various protests during the oath ceremony, during which Kane took her oath with her hand raised which had the words "My oath is to the people" written on it.

On 6 November 2003, Kane appeared on Question Time alongside the SNP's Alex Salmond, Labour MSP Cathy Jamieson, Tory MP Francis Maude and Peter Oborne of The Spectator. Host David Dimbleby referred to her contribution as "eloquent and intriguing". According to the Scottish Socialist Voice, Kane faced accusations from the audience that the SSP were slow to condemn Palestinian suicide bombers — she responded by saying she "condemned all attacks on innocent people, emphasising Israel's fault regarding non-negotiations in the on-going conflict".

In late 2003, she announced that she was taking a short break from politics to deal with clinical depression. She returned to work early in 2004.

In 2005, Kane accepted an invitation to meet Fidel Castro at a conference in Cuba. Later in 2005, she took part in an anti-nuclear protest, locking herself to a model of a nuclear submarine outside the Scottish Parliament building. She was fined £150 for the demonstration, and was imprisoned in Cornton Vale for 14 days in October 2006 after refusing to pay. In January 2007, she was arrested but not charged for taking part in a peaceful anti-nuclear demonstration at Faslane, as part of the Faslane 365 campaign.

In June 2005, along with fellow socialist MSPs Carolyn Leckie, Frances Curran, and Colin Fox, she was suspended from the Scottish Parliament for the month of September for disrupting parliamentary proceedings in a peaceful protest in the chamber. They were highlighting the issue of the right to protest outside the Gleneagles Hotel, the site of the 31st G8 summit.

During her time in parliament, she also campaigned against the treatment of toxic waste in South East Glasgow, against water fluoridation and against GM crops. She remains active in the fight to end the detention of children at Dungavel asylum detention centre, as well as campaigns for migrants rights and against dawn raids. She personally paid the bail for a Cameroonian woman called Mercy Ikolo and her Ireland-born 18-month-old baby to allow them to leave the centre, inviting them to stay with her and her daughters in their tenement flat until their visa issues were resolved.

=== After leaving parliament ===
Kane stood as the no. 1 candidate for her party on the Glasgow regional list for the 2007 Scottish Parliament election. The SSP polled 2,579 votes in the Glasgow region and failed to re-elect any candidates. Since September 2012, Kane has been involved in the Women for Independence campaign for Scottish independence. In April 2015, she organised a vigil in George Square in Glasgow in relation to the murder of Karen Buckley.

== Other information ==
Kane is a member of the Industrial Workers of the World (Wobblies) and became a grandmother in February 2011.

In 2011, Kane played the role of a mother in a play written by future SSP co-spokesperson Sandra Webster as part of the National Theatre of Scotland's Five Minute Theatre project. The play was inspired by Sandra's experience of bringing up her two autistic sons. She also appeared in An Evening with Rosie Kane in May 2012 and played herself in I, Tommy in September 2013.
