= Scottish Socialist Youth =

Scottish political organisation

- Leader: Collective leadership
- Founded: 2001 (original); 2021 (refounded)
- Ideology: Socialism; Scottish independence Scottish republicanism
- Mother party: Scottish Socialist Party (until 2021)
- Website: scottishsocialistyouth.net

Scottish Socialist Youth (SSY) is a non-partisan anti-capitalist organisation which stands for the creation of an independent, socialist Scotland. They regard their core principles as "Socialism, Independence, Social Liberation, Democracy, Internationalism and Environmentalism".

The organisation was previously known as the Young Scottish Socialists (YSS) from a period from 2015 to 2021. In 2021, the organisation was relaunched by ex-members as Scottish Socialist Youth, unaffiliated with the Scottish Socialist Party and as a non-partisan left-wing pressure group.

They have one university affiliate, that being Stirling University SSY.

== Campaigning ==
In 2001 SSY began campaigning for a change to drug laws, including arguing for the legalisation of cannabis, They later broadened to demand new thinking on approaches to all drugs, prompted by the 2009 banning of mephedrone. Their current drug campaign is titled "Help not Harm".

They were involved in the campaign against the G8 summit at Gleneagles. In June 2007, five members of the SSY were arrested at Faslane as part of the Faslane 365 campaign They were also heavily involved in campaigning for the SSP during the 2005 general election and in the 2007 Scottish Parliament and council elections where a number of members stood as SSP candidates.

They have produced workers' rights cards to let young workers know what they are entitled to and how to get it. In November 2007, the SSY organised a protect in conjunction with the SSP LGBT Network against Stagecoach, after two young gay men were threatened with being thrown off a bus as one had their arm around the other.

The results of the 2010 UK election resulting in a coalition government led by the Tories, has led to the SSY campaigning against the new government and the cuts that they are inflicting. SSY received national media attention in 2010 when they organised a demonstration at short notice to coincide with David Cameron's first visit to Scotland as Prime Minister, on 14 May 2010.

Recently, SSY have also been involved in anti-fascist activity in Scotland, notably helping organise mobilisations against the far-right Scottish Defence League in Glasgow, Edinburgh, and Kilmarnock, as well as participating in UK Uncut actions targeting major retailers which practice large scale tax avoidance.

== Structure ==
SSY open to all socialists in Scotland, regardless of party affiliation, aged 14 to 30, however due to advocating for Scottish Independence most members are either non-partisan, Scottish Greens or Scottish Socialists. The organisation have been highly-critical of the Scottish National Party, Scottish Labour Party and Scottish Conservatives.

The day-to-day running of the SSY is the responsibility of the National Organiser, assisted by the National Executive Committee which plays a leadership role. The NEC is elected at the annual National Conference with its membership split equally between men and women. The National Organiser is also elected at the conference. Additionally, SSY has branches across Scotland that conduct activity in their area.

SSY held their tenth annual conference in Glasgow in July 2011.

== Women's Group ==
Women's Group logo

SSY had a self-organised women's group, to which all young women are invited. The aim of the Women's Group is to create a space for young socialist women to talk about the issues that affect them. The Women's Group feel that, in a male-dominated environment, young women can be sidelined and may feel that their opinion is less valid. The SSY Women's Group aims to give young women confidence in their abilities.

At the SSY Conference 2005, the Women's Group decided that their main campaign would be on sex education, in particular discouraging and campaigning against abstinence-only education, which was run in some state schools at the expense of the Scottish Government. Their campaign, "Fuck Abstinence!", involved giving information on reproductive rights to young women denied adequate sex education.
