= Alan McCombes =

Scottish politician

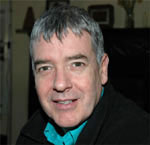
Alan McCombes

Alan William McCombes (born 1955) has been a leading member of the Scottish Socialist Party for several years, and was the editor of the Scottish Socialist Voice until 2003. With Tommy Sheridan, he was also author of Imagine: A Socialist Vision for the 21st Century, described by Tony Benn as "one of the very best books I have ever read on the subject of socialism".

== Political career ==
=== Militant tendency ===
McCombes first became involved in socialist politics in the 1970s, as a member of the Militant group. Together with Tommy Sheridan he played a leading role in the anti-poll tax movement. His 1988 pamphlet, How To Beat The Poll Tax, written a year before the tax was introduced, set out the strategy of a Scotland-wide united mass non-payment campaign.

In 1992 McCombes was a leading figure in the persuading Militant in Scotland to break with Labour resulting in the creation of Scottish Militant Labour. Throughout the 1990s, he challenged the traditional "British Road to Socialism", arguing for the left to champion the idea of an independent Scottish socialist republic. In 1995, he called for a Scottish Socialist Alliance to unite the left. This was established six months later, laying the basis for the emergence of the SSP.

In 1996, McCombes established the Scottish Socialist Voice as a new fortnightly paper of the left, which he edited until 2003. This later became the newspaper of the Scottish Socialist Party.

=== Scottish Socialist Party ===
McCombes held the position of policy co-ordinator for the SSP for a number of years. In this role, he encouraged a rethink of the educational approach within the party and the adoption of more Marxist styles of engagement, influenced in particular by Paulo Freire. He has also argued that the party should embrace more diffuse structures than the traditional models of socialist parties — championing the introduction of issue-based networks in addition to the geographic branch structure. Alongside Tommy Sheridan, he co-wrote Imagine: A Socialist Vision for the 21st Century.

During the bombing of Afghanistan, McCombes travelled to the Pakistan-Afghanistan border to report for the Scottish Socialist Voice.

McCombes co-ordinated the SSP's electoral campaign for the 2003 Scottish Parliament election, which saw the return of 6 MSPs for the party.

He announced his candidacy for convenor of the SSP on 19 January 2005. At the party conference on 13 February, he won 154 votes from SSP delegates, losing by 98 to Colin Fox. He was a leading member of the ISM platform until its dissolution in 2006.

=== Involvement in the Tommy Sheridan defamation trial ===
As part of the Sheridan v News International defamation trial, he appeared at the Court of Session on 16 May 2006 following a demand by News International to hand over confidential internal SSP executive committee minutes. He refused. On 26 May 2006 he was jailed for 12 days and his home was raided by Messengers at Arms after he refused to comply with the order to hand over the documents. He was released on 29 May after a decision by the SSP national council to hand the minutes over to the court.

On 7 July 2006, McCombes gave evidence in the defamation proceedings launched by Tommy Sheridan against the News of the World stating that Sheridan had admitted to him that he had visited swingers clubs. His version of events was supported by ten other people who were present at the meeting and matched the minutes of the meeting presented in court, though these were disputed during the court case.

He declared himself a hostile witness, describing the case as a "squalid little squabble" but was ordered to answer questions by the judge. He said: "I am here under the strongest possible protest. [...] Your client, I have to say, the News of the World, symbolises everything that as a socialist I have stood against my whole adult life. [...] It should have been settled by one of both parties before innocent people were dragged into this bizarre pantomime."

In August 2006, in the aftermath of the Sheridan defamation case, McCombes publicly released an all-members bulletin addressed to members of the SSP, entitled "The Fight for the Truth" in which he said Tommy Sheridan's libel victory over the News of the World "could set back the cause of socialism by years if not decades" because of the divisions that had occurred within the party and went on to give his view of the events leading up to the trial. He also condemned Tommy Sheridan's announcement to stand for election as convenor of the SSP and said that Tommy Sheridan's support had been "based on the more middle class and rural sections of the party" and were "united only by their hostility to the majority of the leadership".

In 2010 he was also a witness in HM Advocate v Sheridan and Sheridan. During the trial it emerged that he was the author of an affidavit to the Sunday Herald which detailed that the party had asked Sheridan to resign as convenor, citing "certain information" in the party's possession. Contrary to prior speculation it emerged that the affidavit did not contain details of the party's 9 November executive meeting.

In June 2011, he published Downfall, his account of the Sheridan affair.

== Environmental activity ==
In the 2010s, McCombes moved to Perthshire to work for the John Muir Trust which works to defend wild land, enhance habitats and encourage people of all ages and backgrounds to connect with wild places. In 2014, he and Roz Paterson published Restless Land: A Radical Journey Through Scotland's History. He worked for the John Muir Trust for 12 years as Communications Editor, Media Manager and Public Affairs Manager before stepping down in July 2024.
