= The Case for an Independent Socialist Scotland =

Book by Colin Fox

- Author: Colin Fox
- Language: English
- Published: 11 September 2013
- Publication place: United Kingdom
- Pages: 40
- ISBN: 978-0-9571986-1-6

The Case for an Independent Socialist Scotland is a pamphlet written by Colin Fox and published by the Scottish Socialist Party in the run-up to the 2014 Scottish independence referendum. It was launched in the Scottish Parliament in September 2013 and soon became the party's best-selling pamphlet. Its publication was welcomed by eight MSPs. In August 2014, the pamphlet was made available as a free download from the party website.

This booklet sets out the Scottish Socialist Party's case for Scotland becoming a modern democratic republic with an elected head of state, operating outwith Nato and no longer possessing nuclear weapons.

== See also ==
- Scotland's Future
