= Scottish Socialist Voice =

Newspaper

- Issue 437 of the Scottish Socialist Voice
- Type: Fortnightly newspaper
- Format: Tabloid
- Owner: Scottish Socialist Party
- Editor: Ken Ferguson
- Founded: 1996
- Political alignment: Socialist
- Headquarters: Suite 308/310, 4th Floor, Central Chambers, 93 Hope St, Glasgow, G2 6LD
- Website: socialistvoice.scot

The Scottish Socialist Voice is a fortnightly political newspaper in Scotland, published by the Scottish Socialist Party.

== History ==
Established in November 1996, the Voice started life as the newspaper of Scottish Militant Labour, before being handed over to the Scottish Socialist Party on its formation in 1998. Alan McCombes, the paper's founding editor, continued to act as editor until 2003. For a short time afterwards it was edited by Kath Kyle, followed by Joanna Harvie, and it is currently edited by Ken Ferguson.

It was originally launched as a fortnightly publication, and moved to a weekly format in May 2001 at great financial cost, before returning to fortnightly production in 2007. In 2009, it changed from a broadsheet to a tabloid format. It is primarily distributed through subscription and street sales.

The aims of the Voice, as set out in its first issue, are:

- To report the struggles of ordinary people against injustice, discrimination and exploitation.
- To expose corruption and hypocrisy in high places.
- To cover politics, culture and sport from a socialist standpoint.
- To champion the cause of an independent socialist Scotland as part of a worldwide fightback against global capitalism.

In December 2004, the Voice celebrated its 200th issue. In November 2006, it celebrated its tenth anniversary.

== Forum events ==
Since at least 2013, the Voice has hosted a number of cross-party discussion events called "Forums". In December 2013, figures from the pro-independence left were invited to a Forum to discuss Scotland's Future, which was chaired by John Finnie and featured Jim Sillars, John McAllion, Isobel Lindsay, Prof Mike Danson, Maggie Chapman, and Colin Fox on its panel.

== See also ==
- List of newspapers in Scotland
