= Scotland's Future =

White paper published by the Scottish Government in 2013

Scotland's Future: Your Guide to an Independent Scotland
- Language: English
- Published: 26 November 2013
- Publication place: Scotland
- Pages: 650
- ISBN: 978-1494314545

Scotland's Future is a government white paper published on 26 November 2013 by the Scottish Government under First Minister Alex Salmond. It lays out the case for Scottish independence and the means through which Scotland would become an independent country in personal union with the United Kingdom. Salmond described it as the "most comprehensive blueprint for an independent country ever published", and argued it shows his government seeks independence not "as an end in itself, but rather as a means to changing Scotland for the better".

== Background and launch ==
The Edinburgh Agreement—a document drawn up by the Governments of the United Kingdom and Scotland—set out the terms for a referendum on Scottish independence, to be held on 18 September 2014. Subject to a Yes vote in this referendum, the Scottish Government said that Scotland would become independent on 24 March 2016.

Scotland's Future—the white paper setting out a framework for an independent Scotland—was launched on 26 November 2013 at Glasgow Science Centre, attracting journalists from "as far afield as China". Deputy First Minister Nicola Sturgeon later presented the document to the Scottish Parliament, making a statement in which she said it details "the opportunities of independence, the benefits for individuals, families, communities and the nation as a whole and the practicalities of how we move from a Yes vote in September next year to becoming an independent country in March 2016".

== Overview ==
Titled Scotland's Future: Your Guide to an Independent Scotland, the 670-page document outlines the Scottish Government's vision of how Scotland would become an independent country, as well as setting out a series of policies that the Scottish National Party would pursue in the event that it were re-elected in the 2016 Scottish Parliament election. These include:

- A new written constitution, which would retain the British monarch as Head of State in a personal union
- Scotland would keep the pound as part of a currency union with the UK, and take on a portion of the UK's national debt
- Removal of Trident nuclear weapons from Scotland within the first parliament
- Employment legislation to help increase the female workforce, and 30 hours per week childcare for pre-school children
- Creation of a 15,000 strong Scottish Defence Force, with a further 5,000 reservists, and a new national intelligence agency
- Britons born and/or living in Scotland entitled to Scottish citizenship and Scottish passport
- Abolition of housing benefit reforms introduced by the Welfare Reform Act 2012 and reversal of plans to introduce Universal Credit
- Basic rate tax allowance, tax credit and minimum wage to rise in line with inflation
- A state pension of £160 from April 2016, and review of UK government plans to raise the retirement age
- Replace BBC Scotland with a Scottish Broadcasting Service (SBS) from 2017, but continue close ties with the BBC, including airing content such as Doctor Who and EastEnders. The Scottish Broadcasting Service would also try to join the European Broadcasting Union and therefore be able to compete in the Eurovision Song Contest.
- Renationalisation of the Royal Mail

The document also contains a 200-page section covering 650 questions on issues relating to independence.

== Response ==
The launch of the document was welcomed in principle by Yes Scotland chairman Dennis Canavan and chief executive Blair Jenkins, and also by Radical Independence Campaign co-founder Jonathon Shafi. Scottish National Party (SNP) Member of Parliament (MP) Angus Robertson welcomed its defence commitments. MSP Joan McAlpine said that it made the United States Declaration of Independence "look like a Post-it note".

Pat Rafferty, Scottish secretary of trade union Unite, said the document offers "some welcome proposals", and that the union "[notes] with interest proposals for the establishment of a National Convention on Employment and Labour Relations which we hope reflects a long-term desire for a more pluralistic approach to employment relations from the Scottish government". However, he also said Unite will "[pursue] more detail on proposals for wider trade union-related legislation and the role of collective bargaining in re-balancing the future Scottish economy".

It was criticised by a number of politicians and commentators. Alistair Darling, chairman of Better Together, called it "a work of fiction" and "a wish-list of political promises". It was styled as "a compendium of existing assertions and a glossary of uncosted policies" by Scottish Liberal Democrat leader Willie Rennie. Scottish Labour leader Johann Lamont dismissed the document as "670 pages of assertion and uncertainty".

Alex Massie suggested in a blog for The Spectator that its release was "designed to shift the Overton Window", and that "its publication nudges the argument forward and makes the idea of independence seem more real, more routine, than it was yesterday".

Alison Rowat of The Herald called it "hopelessly dated in its view of women" and criticised the universal childcare pledge, pointing out that the Scottish Parliament already has the legislative capability to introduce the policy: "In pushing childcare as a game-changing idea, those behind the launch of Scotland's Future show zero appreciation of the basic political tactic of never promising anything you can already deliver." Conversely, an editorial in the Sunday Herald said that "every woman in Scotland should welcome the commitment". Bright Green published an infographic explaining why the policy was not feasible under devolution.

On 7 December 2013, a discussion forum facilitated by the Scottish Socialist Voice invited figures from the pro-independence left to respond to the document. The forum was chaired by John Finnie and featured Jim Sillars, John McAllion, Isobel Lindsay, Prof Mike Danson, Maggie Chapman, and Colin Fox on its panel. McAllion expressed concern over a lack of detail on the proposed "constitutional convention" that would write an independent Scotland's constitution, adding criticism of the Scottish Constitutional Convention that created the blueprint for Scottish devolution.

== See also ==
- The Case for an Independent Socialist Scotland
- Building a New Scotland
