= Warrant sale =

Legal procedure

A warrant sale was a statutory means of collecting debts in Scotland until 2001. Legal procedure for warrant sales was governed by the Debtors (Scotland) Act 1987. The practice was controversial. Those who opposed it were concerned that it affected the poorest section of society who genuinely were unable to pay a debt, but others claimed the legislation was needed to ensure people paid their debts.

It became a contentious political issue in the late 1980s, when Scottish councils used the legislation against an ever-increasing number of Community Charge defaulters, which involved councils applying for a warrant from the local court to collect the money owed by non-payers. Sheriff officers (private companies even though their title suggests they are court employees) were the choice of the local authorities to collect the outstanding debts. Under the 1987 act, debt collectors were permitted to enter a debtor's home and poind (put a value on) items, which would be subject to a later auction under warrant (warrant sale).

The practice was abolished when Tommy Sheridan, MSP, of the Scottish Socialist Party, introduced a private member's bill in 2001, and the Scottish Parliament voted to remove the legislation from Scots law under the Abolition of Poindings and Warrant Sales Act 2001.

In July 2022, Jackie Baillie, MSP, accused the Scottish government of attempting to reintroduce warrant sales as part of the Moveable Transactions Bill.
