= Abolition of Poindings and Warrant Sales Act 2001 =

Act of the Scottish Parliament

- Act of the Scottish Parliament
- Scottish Parliament
- Long title: An Act of the Scottish Parliament to abolish poindings and warrant sales.
- Citation: 2001 asp 1
- Introduced by: Tommy Sheridan
- Territorial extent: Scotland

Dates
- Royal assent: 17 January 2001
- Repealed: 30 December 2002
Other legislation
Amends	Debtors (Scotland) Act 1987
Repealed by	Debt Arrangement and Attachment (Scotland) Act 2002

Status: Repealed

History of passage through the Parliament

Text of statute as originally enacted

Text of the Abolition of Poindings and Warrant Sales Act 2001 as in force today (including any amendments) within the United Kingdom, from legislation.gov.uk.

The Abolition of Poindings and Warrant Sales Act 2001 (asp 1) was an act of the Scottish Parliament to abolish the previous practice in which a debtor's goods are priced (poinding) in preparation for the enforced sale of the debtor's possessions (warrant sale). The legislation was introduced in 1999 as a member's bill by Tommy Sheridan MSP, the sole member of the Scottish Socialist Party in the Parliament.

The original draft of the bill proposed that it would have immediate effect, but this was subsequently amended to delay implementation of the bill until 2002, so that alternative means of debt recovery could be devised. The Scottish Executive eventually proposed the Debt Arrangement and Attachment Bill, which became the Debt Arrangement and Attachment Act 2002 and repealed the Abolition of Poindings and Warrant Sales Act 2001.

The Debt Arrangement and Attachment (Scotland) Act 2002 was criticised by Sheridan for introducing "a new form of warrant sales".

== See also ==
- List of acts of the Scottish Parliament from 1999
