= Tommy Sheridan =

Scottish politician

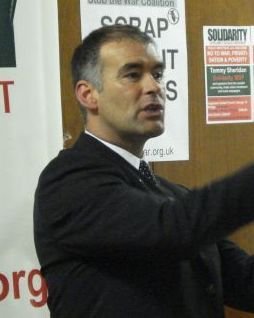
- Sheridan in 2007

Convenor of Solidarity
- In office 17 November 2019 – December 2021
- Preceded by: Pat Lee; Rosemary Byrne
- Succeeded by: Office dissolved
- In office 3 September 2006 – 13 June 2016 Serving with Rosemary Byrne
- Preceded by: Office established
- Succeeded by: Pat Lee; Rosemary Byrne

Convenor of Scottish Socialist Party
- In office 1998 – 11 November 2004
- Preceded by: Office established
- Succeeded by: Colin Fox

Member of the Scottish Parliament for Glasgow
- In office 6 May 1999 – 2 April 2007

Glasgow City Councillor for Pollok
- In office 7 May 1992 – 1 May 2003
- Preceded by: E. J. Nolan
- Succeeded by: Keith Baldassara

Personal details
- Born: 7 March 1964 (age 62) Glasgow, Scotland
- Party: Alliance to Liberate Scotland (2026–present)
- Other political affiliations: Labour (1981–1989); Independent (1989–1991); Scottish Militant Labour (1991–1998); SSP (1998–2006); Solidarity (2006–2021); Alba (2021–2026)
- Education: University of Stirling; University of Strathclyde; Glasgow Caledonian University
- Criminal information
- Conviction: Perjury

Thomas Sheridan (born 7 March 1964) is a Scottish politician. He served as convenor of Solidarity from 2019 to 2021. He previously served as convenor of the Scottish Socialist Party (SSP) from 1998 to 2004 and as co-convenor of Solidarity from 2006 to 2016. He was a Member of the Scottish Parliament (MSP) for the Glasgow region from 1999 to 2007.

Sheridan was active as a Militant entryist in the Labour Party until 1989 when Labour expelled him, and became a member of Scottish Militant Labour (SML), which eventually became the core of the Scottish Socialist Party (SSP). He was a prominent campaigner against the Poll tax in Scotland, and was jailed for six months for attending a warrant sale in 1991 after Glasgow Sheriff Court had served a court order on him banning his presence. He was elected to the Scottish Parliament in 1999 as a Glasgow representative and re-elected in 2003 despite, in 2000 and 2002, being jailed over the non-payment of fines levied in connection with breach of the peace convictions resulting from his actions at demonstrations against the presence of the nuclear fleet at the Faslane Naval Base.

In 2006, in the case of Sheridan v News International, he won an action for defamation against the News of the World and was awarded £200,000 damages. The following year, he was charged with perjury for having told lies to the court in his defamation case. In the following weeks, six of his relatives and colleagues were also charged. In October 2010, he appeared together with his wife Gail at a trial for perjury. On 23 December 2010, Sheridan was convicted of perjury, and on 26 January he was sentenced to three years' imprisonment. The charges against his wife were withdrawn. In the light of the News of the World phone hacking affair, the Crown Office was ordered to reassess the case in 2011. Sheridan left prison in January 2012 under automatic early release rules.

== Early life ==
Sheridan's mother was Alice Sheridan, a political activist who stood as a candidate for political groups involving her son.

Sheridan, raised in the Roman Catholic faith, attended St Monica's Primary (Pollok) and Lourdes Secondary before studying at the University of Stirling, where he received a degree in economics. He obtained a MSc in Social Research at the University of Strathclyde in 2008. He studied law at Strathclyde Law School, on the two-year fast track degree, graduating in 2015. He also played football at Junior level with Larkhall Thistle, Benburb, East Kilbride Thistle, Baillieston Juniors and St Anthony's.

== Political career, 1983–present ==
=== Early activism ===
Sheridan became a member of the Militant group while a student at Stirling University in around 1983, after being active in a broad-based anti-Trotskyist group including Liberals and Communists as well as Labour Party members. After graduation, he went to Cardonald College as a typing student as part of an (unsuccessful) effort on the part of Militant to recruit Scottish Labour Students in further education colleges. The Labour Party, led by Neil Kinnock at the time, found that Militant contravened the Labour Party constitution, and Sheridan himself was expelled from the Labour Party in 1989 for "bringing the party into disrepute".

From within Militant, he was the public face of a mass non-payment campaign against the Community Charge in Scotland (where it was introduced a year earlier than other parts of the UK "as an experiment"). The campaign involving the refusal to pay the tax, together with resistance to warrant sales which local councils held to try to recoup the money, was ultimately successful and Sheridan became a popular political figure. Sheridan denounced those who fought the police in the large-scale riot against the poll tax in London – which took place on 31 March 1990, the day before the tax was introduced in England and Wales – and publicly threatened to "name names". The police widely advertised for people to tell them the names of alleged rioters, and partly as a result of police acting on such information, over 100 individuals were jailed. With Joan McAlpine, he published A Time to Rage which chronicled the anti-poll tax movement of the late-1980s and early-1990s. McAlpine has since written about the Sheridan she became close to, with reference in particular to the defamation case.

As the highest profile Militant member in Scotland, Sheridan was a leading figure in the group's split in the early-1990s. Emboldened by the success of the campaign against the poll tax, many Militant members – particularly in Scotland – argued for the abandonment of entryism and for the creation of Scottish Militant Labour and Militant Labour in England and Wales as separate political parties.

The argument was resolved when Sheridan and his supporters won a vote at a special conference held in Bridlington in October 1991, defeating the faction around Militant founder Ted Grant who argued against abandoning the Labour Party. The result was a split in the Militant in what has become known as the 'Scottish Turn'; Scottish Militant Labour had gained six councillors in Glasgow by 1993, including Sheridan. With a strong Scottish National Party (SNP), Scottish Militant Labour argued in favour of founding a new, left-wing political party. Discussions were held with other left-wing and Scottish republican groups and a new group was formed in 1996 known initially as the Scottish Socialist Alliance. In 1998, the new Scottish Socialist Party was formed from the SSA. Differences over political strategy and priorities within the Committee for a Workers' International (CWI) soon surfaced, especially on the issue of Scottish independence, leading to a split within the CWI and Sheridan along with the majority of Scottish supporters left the organisation.

Sheridan fought two elections while in prison, coming second in the Pollok constituency at the 1992 general election, gaining nearly 20%, a result ahead of three candidates, but behind the elected Labour Party MP. A few weeks later he won the Pollok ward on Glasgow District Council. He contested the European Parliament election in 1994 as the SML candidate in Glasgow, and came third with 8% of votes cast.

=== Election to the Scottish Parliament ===
Sheridan was a leading figure in negotiations to establish the Scottish Socialist Alliance in 1996, which evolved into the Scottish Socialist Party (SSP) in 1998. He became the convenor of the party and was elected to the Scottish Parliament in 1999 as a Glasgow representative and re-elected in 2003. Together with Alan McCombes he published Imagine, an outline of the principles of socialism for a modern era.

Sheridan was active in implementing changes in Scottish law, including the Abolition of Poindings and Warrant Sales Act 2001, which he introduced as bills in Holyrood on 6 December 2001.

On 11 November 2004, Sheridan stepped down as convenor of the SSP, citing his wife Gail's pregnancy as a prime reason. The resignation was steeped in controversy. It later emerged that the party's executive committee voted unanimously to force Sheridan to resign after a 9 November meeting in which he confirmed stories printed about a then-unnamed MSP were about him, and indicated he would take legal action against the paper.

Following Sheridan's resignation, the News of the World named him as the MSP they said had had an extramarital affair and visited a swingers' club in Manchester. The party declined to support him in legal action against the paper. He later branded those who refused to support him as "scabs".

The minutes of the meeting which detailed the deliberations leading to Sheridan's resignation were kept confidential until subpoenaed by News International. After he refused to release the minutes to the Court of Session, Alan McCombes was jailed for twelve days by Judge Lady Smith. At an emergency meeting of the party's National Council, it was agreed the minutes should be handed over — with only 60 delegates opposed — in order to secure McCombes' release the following day.

The minutes included a discussion by the party's executive committee about a recent article that alleged a married MSP had visited a swingers' club in Manchester. According to the minute, Sheridan admitted that he had in fact visited the club on two occasions, in 1996 and 2002, with close friends. Some of those present at the meeting gave evidence that they had heard Sheridan acknowledge he had been "reckless" in his behaviour which had, with hindsight, been "a mistake" and that "his strategy was to deny the allegations". Sheridan claimed this minute was not accurate.

Eleven members, including four of the party's MSPs, stated they heard Sheridan admit to visiting the swingers' club at that meeting. Rosemary Byrne MSP and two other members of the executive committee, Graham McIver and Pat Smith, gave evidence that Sheridan made no such statement. The minutes record that Sheridan left the meeting early, but before leaving, "he repeated that he did not believe there was any evidence which would prove him to be lying. He did not accept that he should admit the visits to the club and felt that no-one should comment on private lives".

At the annual conference of the SSP in early 2005, Sheridan was elected to the SSP executive and at the March 2006 conference, he was elected as party co-chair. However Sheridan left the SSP in August 2006, accusing the SSP of being part of "the mother of all stitch-ups" involving not only their leadership, but also MI5 and News International. He launched a new political party called Solidarity.

Sheridan was originally set to re-contest the post Scottish Socialist Party convenor at the October 2006 conference, and Colin Fox claimed he had only established the new party because he did not stand a chance of winning back that role as SSP convenor.

=== Activism and arrests at Faslane ===
Sheridan was first arrested at the Faslane nuclear base, the location of Britain's Trident submarine fleet, for a breach of the peace offence committed during a demonstration in February 2000. He was convicted on this count, and for resisting arrest, when the case came to trial in November, and was fined £250. Believing nuclear weapons to be illegal under international law, Sheridan made it clear at the time that he had no intention of paying the fine. He served five days of a 14-day jail sentence the next month for this reason, and was released on 22 December.

Sheridan was arrested again at Faslane on 22 October 2001 shortly after the protest began at 7 am. He was cleared when the case came to court in June 2002, the Justice of the Peace said there was insufficient evidence. Another acquittal in October 2001, this time regarding a February 2001 protest, led to an appeal by the Crown Office, but this was rejected by the Court of Criminal Appeal in Edinburgh in October 2002.

Sheridan was one of the first to be arrested for a breach of the peace at a demonstration at Faslane on 11 February 2002. He was found guilty in February 2003 and fined £200, but he refused to pay and was sent to prison for non-payment on 25 August 2003. This time, he was sentenced to seven days in jail, serving 3 days, plus the night in custody after his arrest. Before presenting himself for arrest at Glasgow police station on 24 August 2003, Sheridan had told reporters: "Nuclear weapons are a crime against humanity and should be removed from the Clyde and from Britain."

=== Solidarity ===
In September 2006, Tommy Sheridan formed a new political party in Scotland named Solidarity, with himself and fellow MSP Rosemary Byrne as joint convenors. Sheridan narrowly failed to be re-elected in the 2007 Holyrood election as top of his party's list nominees for Glasgow. The party also stood a candidate in by-elections in 2008 in Glasgow East and the Glenrothes, and Sheridan himself stood in the 2009 Glasgow North East by-election.

Sheridan stood as a candidate in the 2009 European Parliament elections for No to EU – Yes to Democracy, a left-wing alter-globalisation coalition led by RMT union leader Bob Crow.

Sheridan resigned as the co-convenor of Solidarity in June 2016, but returned as convener in 2019. In 2020, Solidarity signed up for Action for Independence, a new pro-independence alliance.

=== Scottish independence referendum ===
In the run-up to the 2014 Scottish independence referendum, Sheridan embarked on a pro-independence speaking tour under the banner "Hope Over Fear". By June 2014, four pro-independence groups — Women for Independence, Labour for Independence, Generation Yes, and the Radical Independence Campaign — had adopted a policy of refusing Sheridan a platform during the campaign. According to a report in the Sunday Herald, pro-independence figures "believe Sheridan is piggy-backing on the independence campaign to gain publicity for an appeal against his conviction".

Following the defeat of the Yes campaign, Sheridan called for a Scottish National Party (SNP) vote at the 2015 general election for the Westminster parliament, which he said would force a second independence referendum by 2020. He was later a headline speaker at a Hope Over Fear rally in George Square on Sunday 12 October, where he sparked controversy by asking for donations to be sent to his home address. He asked for cheques to be made out to a community group run by a former Solidarity candidate. Ahead of the rally, former MSP Rosie Kane said: "Try to understand that Tommy is a divisive and manipulative character. By all means go along, but don't for a minute imagine that this is an open, inclusive and friendly event. This is ego at its most manipulative."

=== Political activities (2021–present) ===
In March 2021 he and his wife Gail joined the Alba Party.

On 1 February 2026, it was announced Sheridan would be the Alba Party's top candidate in the Glasgow region at the 2026 Scottish Parliament election. On 12 March 2026, it was announced that Sheridan and his wife would stand for Alliance to Liberate Scotland in the election after Alba's dissolution. He was placed top of the list in Glasgow. During the election campaign, Sheridan caused controversy after attending a Celtic F.C. event in Northern Ireland where he said that he was "on the side of the IRA, Hamas, and Hezbollah." He said he supported the above organisations as they are "doing the resistance." Speaking to the Daily Record, Sheridan said: "I refuse to accept the false narrative of the powerful in society who always cast those fighting for freedom and basic human rights as terrorists. I believe in a free Palestine. I believe in a united Ireland. I believe in an independent Scotland. Some will agree with me and some won't. That's life." Ultimately, the Alliance were unsuccessful in winning any seats, after receiving 3,128 list votes (1.3%).

== Defamation action ==
Hearings in Sheridan's defamation case against the publishers of the News of the World began in the Court of Session in Edinburgh on 4 July 2006. Unusually in Scottish civil proceedings, the case was heard before a jury.

The jury heard allegations that Sheridan had visited a swingers clubs in Manchester and engaged in adulterous affairs with two women. Sheridan, who claims to be a teetotaller, reportedly drank champagne and consumed cocaine during an extramarital liaison. Sheridan denied drinking champagne and the claim of substance abuse. Eleven members of the SSP's executive committee testified that he admitted in an executive committee meeting to attending a swingers club with women, but another four members of the SSP who were present at that Executive meeting backed Sheridan's claim that he made no such admission at that meeting.

On 14 July 2006, Sheridan sacked his legal team and began representing himself. His cross-examination of witnesses was described by one left commentator as "sickening", singling out the cross-examination of Katrine Trolle: "Sheridan questioned her about their sexual history, which included visits to Cupids swingers' club with Sheridan and group sex encounters with him and his brother-in-law, Andrew McFarlane. When she stated that she was embarrassed about her past, but that she was telling the truth, Sheridan unflinching brandished her as a perjurer, plotter and gold-digger. [...] I still find it astonishing, and not a little dispiriting, that anyone on the left – any decent human being in fact – could justify traducing a female socialist's character in court, not once, but twice, in order to protect a leading socialist politician's false reputation."

On 4 August 2006, Sheridan won his case with a majority verdict of 7–4 and the jury awarded him maximum damages of £200,000. The News of the World has appealed the verdict. In the Scottish Socialist Voice of 8 August, a letter signed by a further six leading members of the SSP claimed that Sheridan had told them that he had admitted at an SSP Executive meeting to attending the Manchester swingers club.

The News of the World intended to appeal against what they described as the "perverse" decision in the immediate aftermath of the trial, and a provisional date for the hearing was set for December 2007, however it was postponed until the outcome of the procurator fiscal's perjury probe.

=== Allegations of witness intimidation ===
On 10 October 2006, BBC News reported that Grampian Police were investigating a claim by Fiona McGuire, who had been a witness in the trial for the News of the World, that she had received a death threat through the post. In a statement to the BBC, Sheridan said: "I utterly condemn any threats to Fiona McGuire or any other individual".

On 26 August 2007, the Sunday Herald reported that John Lynn had been questioned by detectives about allegations of witness tampering. Lynn is reportedly an associate of Paul Ferris, a reformed criminal who has become friendly with Sheridan. The report said Helen Allison, who claimed in court that she saw Sheridan having sex in a Glasgow hotel, had been approached by Lynn who asked her not to give evidence. Lynn was once jailed for 17 years for shooting an Ulster barman.

=== Hidden video ===
On 1 October 2006, the News of the World reignited controversy by publishing new evidence in support of its claim that Sheridan lied to the Court of Session. It was a video recording of Sheridan admitting he had visited a swingers club in Manchester on two occasions and further, that he had, as other senior SSP members claimed in court, admitted this at an Executive meeting of the SSP. The tape had been made without Sheridan's knowledge using a hidden camera by SSP member George McNeilage in McNeilage's house after he invited Sheridan there. McNeilage had been one of three best men at Sheridan's wedding.

Sheridan does not appear clearly on the video at any time. The newspaper had not been able to produce any images from the video showing Sheridan's face and Sheridan said the video was a fake. He conceded his voice was on the tape but suggested it was spliced with clips of the voice of someone else. The News of the World claimed four independent voice analysts had confirmed that the voice on the tape is that of Tommy Sheridan. However, in an interview with the BBC a forensic speech scientist, Peter French, said: "Experts should never say conclusively they have identified a person and this kind of evidence should never solely be used to bring a criminal trial".

Sheridan then suggested that MI5, someone within the SSP, Rupert Murdoch and Bill Gates had conspired to concoct the videotape to undermine his campaign for an independent socialist Scotland.

=== Perjury conviction ===
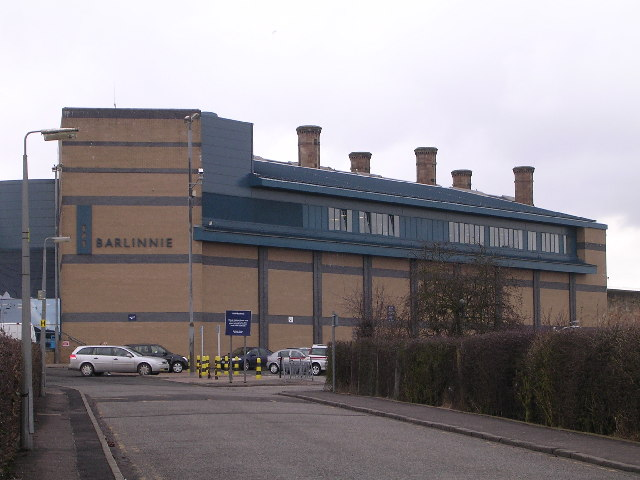
HM Prison Barlinnie

The conflicting evidence given during the trial resulted in the judge warning several witnesses about the implications of perjuring themselves. On Monday 7 August 2006, Lothian and Borders Police said they had received two complaints of perjury, one from the former Conservative MSP Brian Monteith, the other alleged to be from the SSP's minutes secretary.

On 22 August 2006, the Crown Office instructed the Edinburgh Procurators Fiscal office to ascertain if there were grounds for a criminal investigation. On 2 October 2006, it was concluded that there were and Lothian and Borders Police were instructed to start a criminal investigation. On 21 February 2007, The Herald reported that the Crown Office had asked Lothian and Borders Police to undertake a full inquiry after receiving a preliminary report.

In May 2007, it was reported that staff at Cupid's Swingers Club in Manchester had told police they had been offered bribes not to co-operate with the inquiry.

On 16 December 2007, Sheridan was charged with perjury in relation to the News of the World case. In a public statement outside the police station he attributed his arrest to the "powerful reach" of the Murdoch press. During February 2008, his wife Gail, former SSP MSP Rosemary Byrne, former members of the SSP Executive Committee, Patricia Smith, Graeme McIver, Jock Penman, and Sheridan's father-in-law, Angus Healey, were also charged with perjury.

On 27 January 2009, Sheridan and his wife were indicted for perjury, and were summoned to attend a pre-trial hearing at Edinburgh High Court on 26 February. however this was postponed until 11 May.

The trial started at Glasgow High Court on 4 October 2010. Sheridan's initial defence team included Donald Findlay, who was replaced by Maggie Scott. However, a few weeks into the case, Sheridan instructed his Solicitor Aamer Anwar, who had defended him since 2007, to withdraw Scott's instructions. He then conducted his own defence, with Anwar assisting him as amicus curiae.

On 23 December 2010 a jury found Sheridan guilty of perjury and on 26 January 2011 he was sentenced to 3 years in prison. Initially he was held in Barlinnie prison in Glasgow, but after several weeks he was moved to a semi-open wing in Barlinnie, and on 21 June he was moved to Castle Huntly open prison. Sheridan was released to a Home Detention Curfew on 30 January 2012, having served just over one year of his sentence.

Sheridan and Aamer Anwar subsequently parted company, with Gordon Dangerfield acting as his lawyer.

In 2015 the Scottish Criminal Cases Review Commission declined to refer the case to the High Court.

==== Support for Sheridan ====
A "Defend Tommy Sheridan" campaign was launched by sympathetic trade unionists and politicians to demand why Sheridan was being investigated. In December 2007, Sunday Herald columnist Iain MacWhirter said it was "hard not to conclude that the police's diligence has been inspired by Rupert Murdoch's News International." The campaign drew support from the politician George Galloway and leading trade unionist Bob Crow (RMT). At a June 2008 rally organised by the campaign, speakers including FBU secretary Kenny Ross, Paddy Hill, and Gerry Conlon queried the motives for the investigation, questioned the role of the police and Crown Office and verbally attacked the witnesses who had given evidence unhelpful to Sheridan in the original hearing.

=== Claims of illegal surveillance ===
In March 2007, Lothian and Borders Police investigated claims that Tommy Sheridan had been bugged after a suspicious device was found in his car. The device was described as "not of the kind used by British security services".

A complaint submitted to Strathclyde Police in July 2011 lead to Operation Rubicon, a major investigation involving 50 officers investigating allegations of phone hacking, breach of data protection and perjury by News of the World. In May 2012, Andy Coulson, editor of the News of the World from 2003 – 2007 and who gave evidence at Sheridan's trial, was detained "on suspicion of committing perjury before the High Court in Glasgow". On 7 July 2014, following Coulson's conviction on phone hacking charges, Coulson himself faced perjury charges over Sheridan's trial, and on 23 February 2015, a pre-evidential hearing at the High Court in Edinburgh set a trial date of 21 April. On 3 June 2015, Coulson was formally acquitted after the case against him was dismissed by a judge.

=== News Group appeal against defamation award (2016) ===
An appeal hearing at the Court of Session in Edinburgh against the 2006 defamation award in light of Sheridan's later perjury conviction began on 10 May 2016. New Group Newspapers (now part of News UK) lost their appeal against the award of £200,000 damages to Sheridan on 19 August 2016.

=== Publications ===
Sheridan's rise and fall are dealt with in two works of political analysis: Downfall by his erstwhile colleague Alan McCombes (2011), and Tommy Sheridan: From Hero to Zero? by Gregor Gall (2012).

== Other activities ==
=== Broadcasting ===
Tommy Sheridan had a weekly Sunday morning show on Talk 107 for 18 months, but the station did not renew his contract due to cutbacks and changes to programming that saw Mike Graham and others leave Talk107. He hosted a chat show during the Edinburgh fringe in 2007, which received muted reviews. He appeared in the Celebrity version of Big Brother UK. He was the fifth to be evicted (during the double eviction on 21 January 2009). He received mixed reactions from the crowd upon both entry and exit, and admitted during the post-eviction interview that his primary motivation for taking part was that he "needed the money".

=== Celebrant ===
By 30 June 2018, Sheridan trained to become a humanist celebrant. Sheridan cited the reason as his occasional role presiding over funerals.

== Depictions ==
Sheridan is played by Cal MacAninch in the 2025 ITV drama about the News International phone hacking scandal, The Hack.

== Elections contested ==
UK Parliament elections

Date of election	Constituency	Party	Votes	%
1992	Glasgow Pollok	SML	6,287	19.26
1997	Glasgow Pollok	SSA	3,639	11.09
2010	Glasgow South West	Solidarity (TUSC)	931	2.9

Scottish Parliament elections

Date of election	Region	Party	Votes	%	Results
1999	Glasgow	SSP	18,581	7.2	Elected
2003	Glasgow	SSP	31,216	15.2	Elected
2007	Glasgow	Solidarity	8,544	4.1	Not elected
2016	Glasgow	Solidarity	3,593	1.4	Not elected
2026	Glasgow	Alliance to Liberate Scotland			

Date of election	Constituency	Party	Votes	%
1999	Glasgow Pollok	SSP	5,611	21.5
2003	Glasgow Pollok	SSP	6,016	27.9

European Parliament elections

Date of election	Constituency	Party	Votes	%	Notes
1994	Glasgow	SML	12,113	7.6	Single member constituency

Date of election	Region	Party	Votes	%	Results	Notes
2009	Scotland	No2EU	9,693	0.9	Not elected	Multi-member constituency
