= Rosemary Byrne =

Scottish politician (born 1948)

Convenor of Solidarity
- In office 3 September 2006 – 17 November 2019 Serving with Tommy Sheridan (2006–2016) and Pat Lee (2016–2019)
- Preceded by: Office established
- Succeeded by: Tommy Sheridan

Member of the Scottish Parliament for South of Scotland
- In office 1 May 2003 – 2 April 2007

Personal details
- Born: 3 March 1948 (age 78) Irvine, North Ayrshire, Scotland
- Party: SSP (until 2006); Solidarity (2006–2021)

Rosemary Byrne (born 3 March 1948, Irvine, North Ayrshire) is a Scottish politician who served as co-convenor of Solidarity from 2006 to 2019.

Byrne was a Member of the Scottish Parliament (MSP) for the South of Scotland region from 2003 to 2007. She was elected as a Scottish Socialist Party (SSP) MSP but in September 2006, together with Tommy Sheridan, she left that party to form Solidarity.

Byrne lives in Irvine, and was a teacher and a trade union activist for several years. At one time she was president of Irvine Trades Council.

== Political career ==
She stood unsuccessfully in the 2001 United Kingdom general election as the Scottish Socialist Party candidate for Cunninghame South (UK Parliament constituency).

In the 2003 Scottish Parliament election Byrne stood as the Scottish Socialist Party candidate for the Cunninghame South constituency to the Scottish Parliament, where she received 2,677 votes and came third. She was elected to a regional seat from the SSP's list.

The SSP returned six MSPs at the 2003 election. Byrne was the only one of the six who was not already a member of the SSP executive, she was arguably the least prominent. She was elected to the executive in early 2004, and at the February 2005 conference she was elected as one of the SSP's co-chairs. However she did not stand for re-election to this post or the executive committee at its conference in March 2006, stating that she was standing down for personal reasons.

On 3 September Sheridan and Byrne launched a new political party, naming it Solidarity – Scotland's Socialist Movement.

== Sheridan vs. News International ==
There was a controversial defamation case in 2006 between fellow SSP MSP Tommy Sheridan and the British tabloid newspaper The News Of The World, Sheridan v News International. Following this, Sheridan and Byrne split from the SSP, and formed a new socialist party which they named Solidarity.

During the trial, in which Sheridan sued the News of the World for defamation and won, Byrne gave evidence supporting Sheridan. On 1 October 2006 the News of the World published fresh evidence which it claimed proved that their allegations were true and Sheridan had thus lied to the Court of Session during the trial. Sheridan was subsequently charged with and eventually convicted of perjury.

Both Byrne and Sheridan were accused by the IWW of betraying workers by unilaterally removing funding from the collective body which employed parliamentary staff.

On 15 February 2008, Byrne was arrested on suspicion of perjury in relation to the Sheridan defamation trial. However, the Crown Office said that the matter would not be taken further at the conclusion of the subsequent criminal trial.

In June 2016, Sheridan resigned from his position as co-convener of the Solidarity, with councillor Pat Lee elected to replace him alongside Byrne.
