= Frances Curran =

Scottish former co-chair of the Scottish Socialist Party

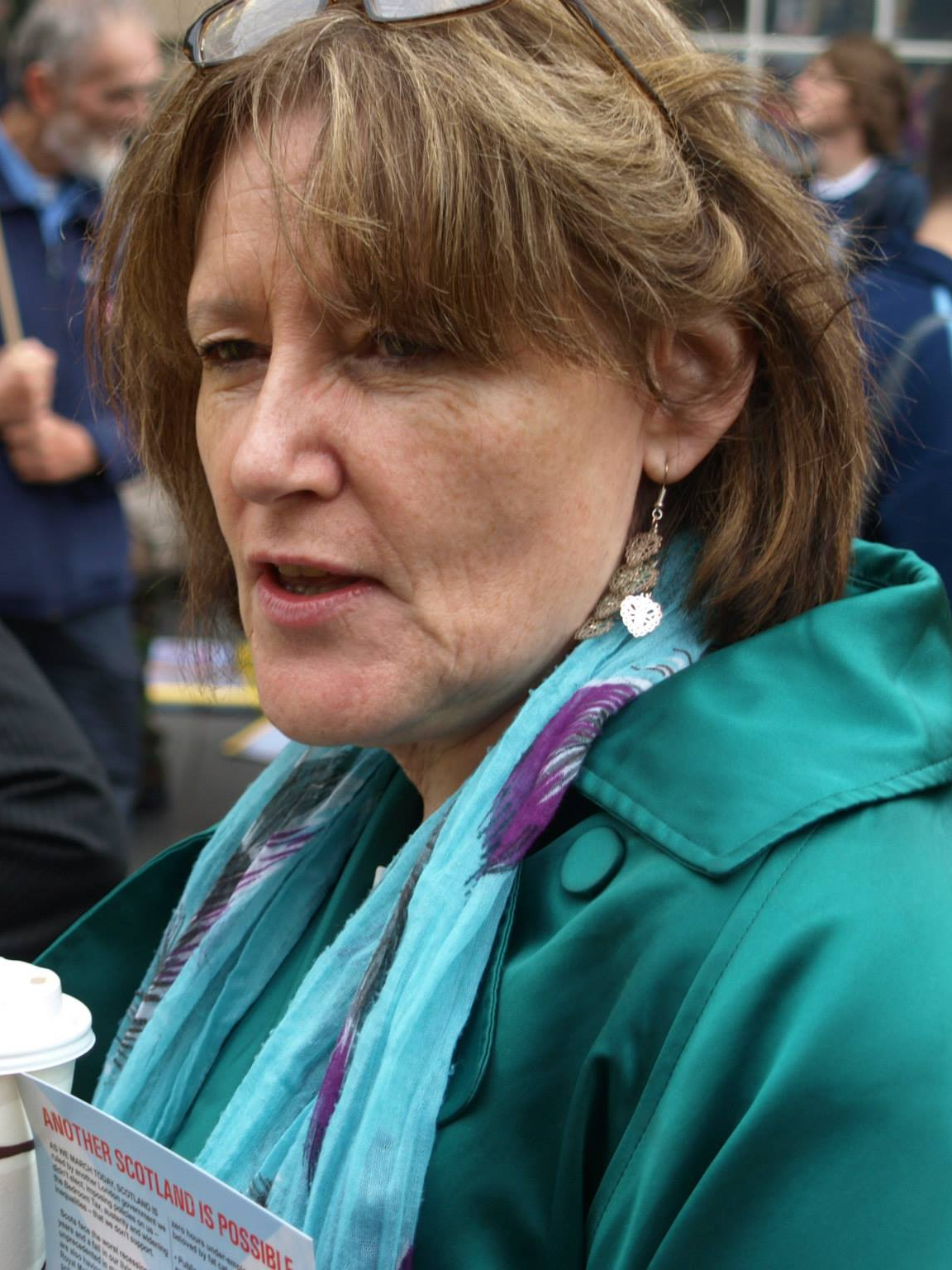
- Frances Curran in September 2013

Member of the Scottish Parliament for West of Scotland
- In office 1 May 2003 – 2 April 2007

Personal details
- Born: 21 May 1961 (age 65) Glasgow, Scotland
- Party: Scottish Socialist Party
- Children: 1

Frances Curran (born 21 May 1961) is a former co-chair of the Scottish Socialist Party. She was a Member of the Scottish Parliament (MSP) for the West of Scotland region from 2003 to 2007.

== Political career ==
=== Early political career and Militant ===
Curran was active in socialist politics from the early 1980s. A member of the Labour Party, she became an organiser for the Militant tendency—the Trotskyist entryist group that led the Labour Party Young Socialists (LPYS)—and served as the LPYS's representative on Labour's National Executive Committee. By 1991 she had risen into Militant's central leadership: she was among those present at the executive of Militant's National Editorial Board on 10 April 1991, alongside figures including Peter Taaffe, Ted Grant and Rob Sewell, at the meeting that discussed launching an independent organisation in Scotland.

When Militant split later in 1991 over the "open turn"—the decision to abandon Labour entryism and organise openly—the initiative in Scotland took shape as Scottish Militant Labour. Curran was subsequently involved in the Scottish Socialist Alliance (formed 1996) before joining the Scottish Socialist Party on its formation in 1998.

=== With the Scottish Socialist Party ===
In July 2005, Curran played a role in organising the protest outside Gleneagles at the 2005 G8 Summit. The previous week, she and other SSP MSPs took part in a protest within the Scottish Parliament, which led to them being suspended for the month of September and fined £30,000. This protest was due to their claim that the First Minister had gone back on his word that the parliament would support the rally outside the Perthshire hotel.

Curran was the public face of the SSP's campaign for the provision of nutritious free school meals, which they said would tackle ill health and poor diet in Scottish schoolchildren. Her campaign drew a wide base of support from a number of children's and health charities. As part of the Save Our Services campaign, she was involved in community occupations to stop the closure of a school and community centre. In 2007, she was arrested but not charged at an anti-nuclear protest at Faslane as part of the Faslane 365 campaign.

She was an unsuccessful candidate in the July 2008 Glasgow East by-election. During the campaign, she was informed that the police had received death threats against her.

She stood again as a candidate on the Glasgow regional list for the Holyrood election in 2011, but failed to be elected. She had stepped down as the party's national co-spokesperson less than a month before the election.

Curran was elected to the SSP's Executive Committee in 2012 but stood down again in 2013, keeping a low profile throughout the party's referendum campaign. She was elected as party co-chair alongside Bill Bonnar at the 2014 conference, but withdrew her nomination for the position on the day of the 2015 conference seven months later. She was re-elected to the SSP executive at its 2016 conference.

At the 2018 conference she stood for national spokesperson, but lost to Róisín McLaren.

Party political offices
Preceded by Steve Morgan	Youth representative on the National Executive Committee of the Labour Party; 1984–1986	Succeeded by Linda Douglas
