= John Finnie =

Scottish politician (born 1956)

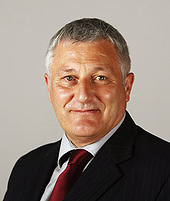

Member of the Scottish Parliament for Highlands and Islands (1 of 7 Regional MSPs)
- In office 5 May 2011 – 5 May 2021

Personal details
- Born: 31 December 1956 (age 69) Clunes, Lochaber, Scotland
- Party: Scottish Greens
- Other political affiliations: Independent (2012–2014); Scottish National Party (until 2012)
- Children: Ruth Maguire
- Occupation: Police officer
- Website: johnfinnie.scot

John Bradford Finnie (born 31 December 1956) is a Scottish Greens politician. He was the Green Member of the Scottish Parliament (MSP) for the Highlands and Islands region from 2016 up until 2021, having previously sat as a Scottish National Party (SNP) member from 2011 to 2012 then as an independent from 2012 to 2016.

He was formerly a police officer and then a councillor.

== Early life ==
Finnie was born in Clunes, and was educated at Achnacarry Primary and Lochaber High School.

== Police ==
Finnie became a police officer in 1976 and served with the Lothian and Borders Police and then as a uniformed Constable, latterly a Constable Dog Handler within the Northern Constabulary. He was a full-time elected official – Constable Secretary, local branch of the Scottish Police Federation (SPF).

== Political career ==
Finnie developed political awareness while still at High School and joined the SNP at 16 years old. He first stood as a candidate in a 2006 by-election for a Highland Council seat. In 2007 he was elected to representing the Inverness Ness-side ward on Highland Council. He was SNP group leader and an SNP-Independent administration was formed. In June 2008 the coalition split. In November 2010, Finnie wrote to the Lord Advocate, urging her to reinvestigate the case of Willie McRae, who died in 1985.

Finnie was elected to the Scottish Parliament in the 2011 election. He was parliamentary liaison officer to the Justice Secretary Kenny MacAskill.

Finnie resigned from the SNP on 23 October 2012 over the party's decision to support NATO membership for an independent Scotland, attending Holyrood as an independent member. In November of that year, he denied rumours that he was planning to join the Scottish Socialist Party. Eventually, in October 2014, he joined the Scottish Green Party although continued as an independent MSP until the end of that session of parliament.

In November 2013, Finnie submitted a Private Member's Bill proposal seeking to abolish the requirement for mandatory involvement of religious representatives on local authorities’ education committees.

In March 2015, the Scottish Greens balloted their members to select candidates for the 2016 election, Finnie was placed top on their Highlands and Islands regional list. He was re-elected in the 2016 election and was joined in the Scottish Parliament by his daughter, Ruth Maguire, who represents Cunninghame South for the SNP.

In November 2016 he was announced as a member of the Commission on Parliamentary Reform, having been nominated to represent the Scottish Greens.

In May 2017, Finnie introduced a Private Member's Bill proposal seeking equal protection from assault for children by prohibiting their physical punishment by parents and others in charge of them. On 5 September 2017, the Scottish Government included support for his proposal in its Programme for Government for 2017–18. The proposed measures became law on 7 November 2019 (Children (Equal Protection from Assault) (Scotland) Act 2019).

He announced in 2019 that he would not stand for re-election in 2021.
