= Scottish Militant Labour =

- Abbreviation: SML
- Founded: October 1991
- Dissolved: 1998
- Preceded by: Revolutionary Socialist League
- Succeeded by: Scottish Socialist Party
- Ideology: Marxism; Trotskyism; Revolutionary socialism; Scottish independence
- International affiliation: Committee for a Workers' International

Scottish Militant Labour (SML) was a Trotskyist political party operating in Scotland for most of the 1990s and was part of the Committee for a Workers' International. It later became known as the International Socialist Movement, which has since dissolved.

It was formed when Militant (also known as the Militant tendency) split after abandoning entryist tactics in the Labour Party. Its best known member was Tommy Sheridan, although Alan McCombes played an important role behind the scenes. The party had six councillors in Glasgow between 1993 and 1995.

In 1998, the Scottish Socialist Voice announced that the SML executive had decided to support Scottish independence.

In 1996, it led the formation of the Scottish Socialist Alliance, the precursor of the modern Scottish Socialist Party (SSP) formed in 1998. As part of the SSA and SSP it changed its name to the International Socialist Movement. Many of its leading members were leading members of the SSP. A split occurred after years of debate centred on questions such as what the SSP should be, what the nature of a revolutionary party is and the relationship of the ISM to the CWI. The majority of ISM members broke with the CWI while a minority stayed part of the CWI and created the International Socialists (Scotland), which claimed to be the successor of SML.

Tommy Sheridan was co-convenor of Solidarity (Scotland), and the International Socialists were a platform within it.

== Electoral performance ==
Westminster Elections	No. of votes	Percentage of Scottish vote	Seats won	Additional information
1992 General Election	6,287	0.21%	0 seats	
1997 General Election	9,740	0.35%	0 seats	Ran as part of Scottish Socialist Alliance

== See also ==
- International Socialist Movement
