= Scottish Socialist Party =

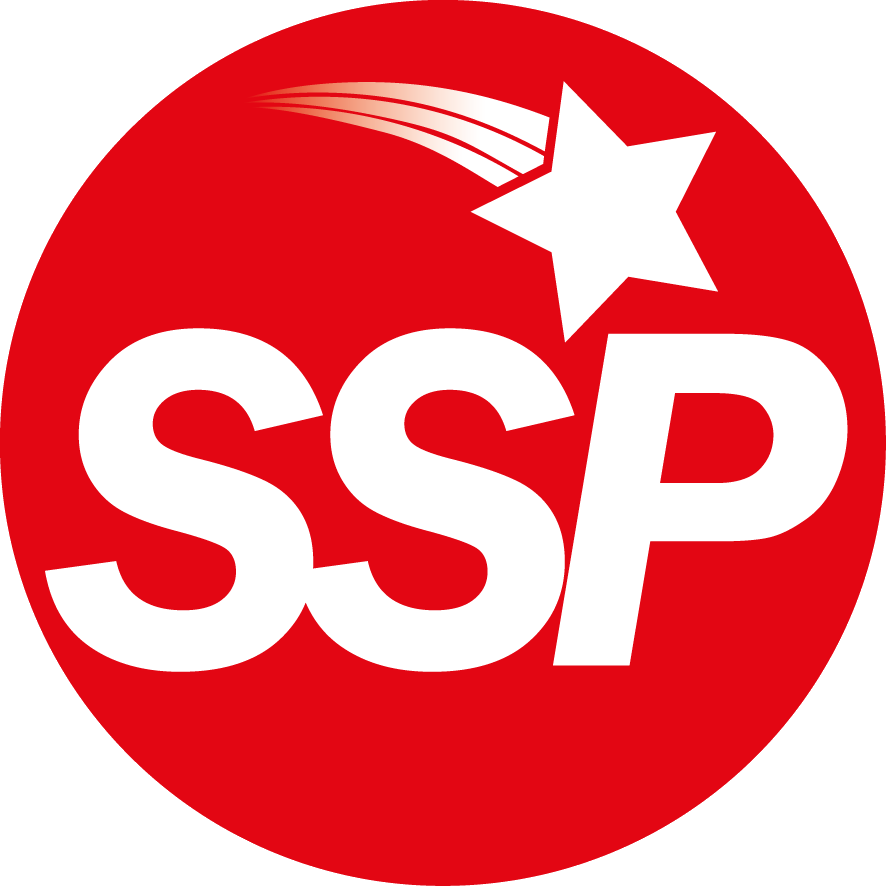
- Abbreviation: SSP
- Chairperson: Christine McVicar
- Secretary: Bill Bonnar
- Spokesperson: Colin Fox; Natalie Reid
- Workplace Organiser: Richie Venton
- Founded: 20 September 1998; 28 years ago
- Merger of: Scottish Socialist Alliance; Scottish Militant Labour
- Headquarters: Suite 370; Central Chambers; 93 Hope Street; Glasgow; G2 6LD
- Newspaper: Scottish Socialist Voice
- Ideology: Democratic socialism; Scottish independence; Scottish republicanism
- Political position: Left-wing
- Colours: Red, white, and yellow
- Scottish Parliament: 0 / 129
- Local government in Scotland: 0 / 1,227

Website
- www.scottishsocialistparty.org

The Scottish Socialist Party (SSP; Scottish Gaelic: Pàrtaidh Sòisealach na h-Alba; Scots: Scots Socialist Pairty) is a left-wing political party campaigning for the establishment of an independent socialist Scottish republic.

The party was founded in 1998. It campaigns for Scottish independence, against cuts to public services and welfare and for democratic public ownership of the economy. The SSP was one of three parties in Yes Scotland, the official cross-party campaign for Scottish independence in the 2014 referendum, with national co-spokesperson Colin Fox sitting on its advisory board.

The party operates through a local branch structure and publishes Scotland's longest-running socialist newspaper, the Scottish Socialist Voice. At the height of its electoral success in 2003, the party had six Members of the Scottish Parliament (MSPs) and two councillors, but since 2017 it has had no councillors or MSPs.

== Democratic structures ==
The party had two national co-spokespersons, Colin Fox and Róisín McLaren, who were elected by party members at the 2018 annual national conference, which also determines party policy. The day-to-day business of the party is handled by a small Executive Committee, which is also elected by the membership. The primary decision-making bodies are the following:

- National Conference, convening yearly
- National Council, convening four times a year
- Executive Committee, convening regularly

== History ==
=== Formation and initial electoral success ===
The Scottish Socialist Party was founded on 20 September 1998. It emerged from the Scottish Socialist Alliance (SSA), a broad-based group of left-wing organisations in Scotland. Tommy Sheridan, then convener of the party was elected through the Glasgow region list. The period following that election saw sustained growth for the SSP, where it doubled in size in twelve months, and the RMT trade union affiliated to the party. The Scottish Republican Socialist Party also decided to narrowly merge with the SSP.

One of the first bills the SSP put forward in Holyrood was the Abolition of Poindings and Warrant Sales Act 2001, aimed at reforming the debt recovery systems in Scotland. The party also presented bills to replace the council tax with an income-based alternative, for the abolition of prescription charges, and the introduction of free school meals.

On 11 November 2004, Sheridan resigned as convener of the party, citing personal reasons. He was replaced by Colin Fox, a Lothians MSP, in the 2005 leadership election. Following Sheridan's resignation, the News of the World revealed that he had an extramarital affair and visited a swingers' club in Manchester. Sheridan denied the stories and launched legal action against the newspaper. During the high-profile media involvement, Sheridan publicly referred to those who refused to support him as "scabs". Sheridan won the initial legal action but eventually went to jail for perjury in 2010.

An appeal to launch the Scottish Socialist Party United Left grouping took place on 13 June 2006. Despite bearing many of the hallmarks of a platform within the SSP, United Left did not view themselves as such, and described themselves as a network rather than a platform. Within the wider SSP, however, they were widely regarded as a platform. The grouping was formed amid crisis, involving both the Sheridan v News Group Newspapers Ltd court case and concerns over the efficacy and unity of the party at the time.

=== Electoral performance after 2007 ===
Neither the SSP or Sheridan's breakaway party Solidarity won seats in the 2007 elections to the Scottish Parliament. The SSP did experience a recovery in by-elections from 2008 to 2009, increasing its vote share compared to the 2007 national result. The party contested the 2009 European elections around the slogan of "Make Greed History", campaigning for a Europe-wide tax on millionaires, and also achieved a higher vote share than in the Scottish Parliament election.

The party ran ten candidates at the 2010 general election, and said the blame for the eventual Conservative victory lay "with New Labour and the failure of Tony Blair and Gordon Brown these last thirteen years, who have, quite frankly, exploited working people, with the poorest and most vulnerable being hit hardest". Fox said his party's manifesto would tackle the "worst economic crisis in eighty years" without punishing ordinary people.

The SSP launched their manifesto for the 2011 Scottish Parliament election with promises to oppose cuts and tax the rich. The party contested all eight Scottish Parliament regions.

=== 2014 Scottish independence referendum ===
Following the 2011 elections to the Scottish Parliament and the resulting Scottish National Party majority, the Scottish Government announced its intent to hold an independence referendum in 2014. In May 2012, a cross-party organisation called Yes Scotland was established to campaign for a "Yes" vote. The SSP's national co-spokesperson, Colin Fox, was invited to sit on its advisory board at the insistence of Yes Scotland's non-partisan chief executive, Blair Jenkins, in the face of SNP opposition. During the referendum campaign, the party continued to campaign on other issues including the bedroom tax, fuel poverty, equal marriage, and the latest Israel-Gaza conflict.

On 11 September 2013, the SSP launched a pamphlet called The Case for an Independent Socialist Scotland, the publication of which was welcomed by MSPs. It became the party's fastest-selling pamphlet ever. In June 2014, the party published another pamphlet outlining its case for "a modern democratic republic". In response to the publication of Scotland's Future, the party said the Scottish Government had set out a vision that represents "significant advance for the people of Scotland", but reaffirmed the SSP's commitment to socialism.

As part of the party's campaign for independence, it held dozens of public meetings across Scotland with a range of speakers. The party's final meeting, scheduled to take place in Drumchapel Community Centre, was cancelled after unionist protests. In the aftermath, Richie Venton said: "Those demonstrating may have learned that their support for a Westminster regime was impoverishing themselves and their communities. But what they should know is we shall continue to fight against austerity and the tyranny of the Tories over communities like Drumchapel, Govan, Easterhouse, and, indeed, Scotland."

In an interview with the Sunday Herald in late-August 2014, Colin Fox said: "The SSP has brought a proletarian sense to Yes Scotland and reminded people the decisive issue is whether people think they're going to be better off. It's not the currency, it's not the EU, it's not those highfalutin' chattering class issues." He said that the party brought "a sense of the schemes, the workplaces, the unions" to the campaign.

=== After the referendum ===
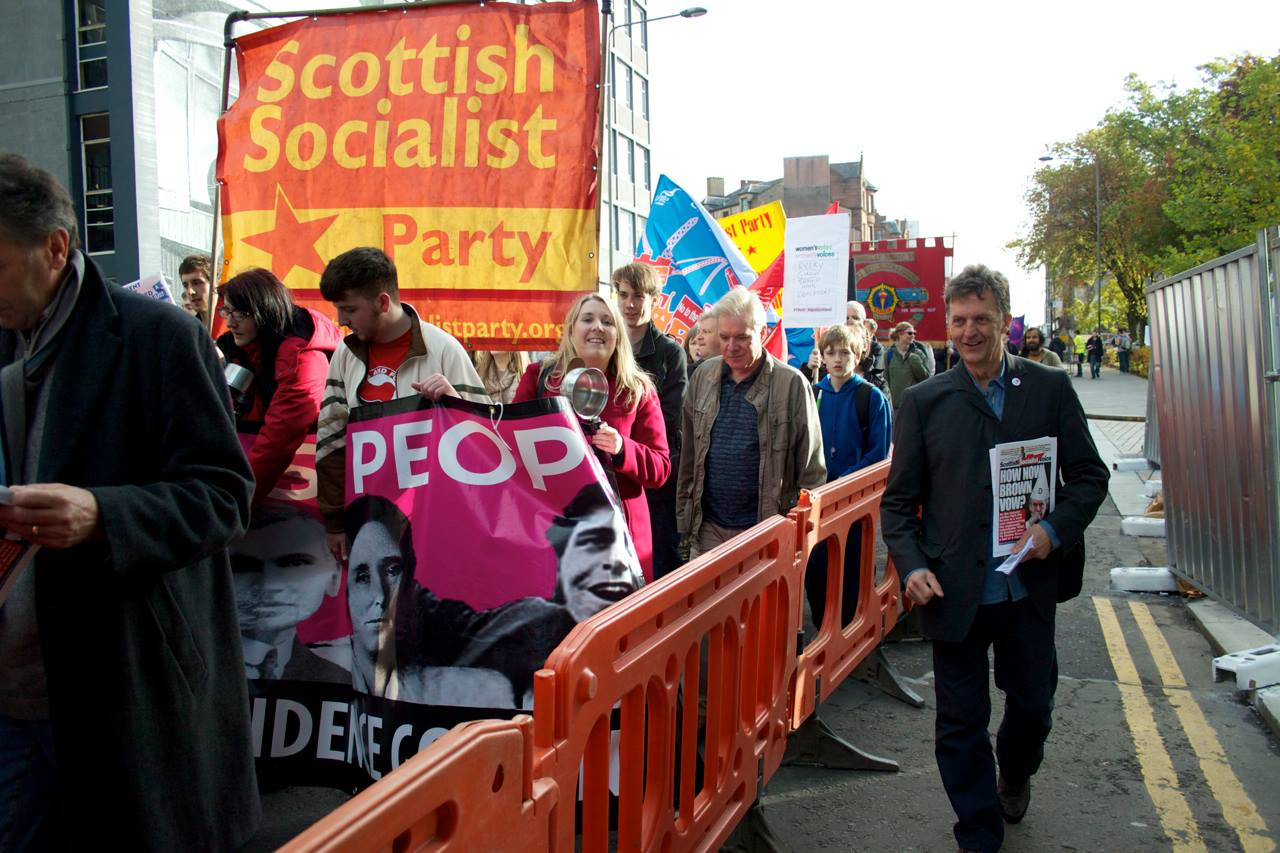
Richie Venton (right) with the SSP in Glasgow, 18 October 2014

After the announcement of the referendum result, in which the pro-union Better Together campaign won; the SSP was amongst the political parties that reported significant increases in their membership levels. Prominent new members included Labour for Independence founder Allan Grogan. The Scottish section of Socialist Appeal left Labour to join the SSP.

When the make-up of the Smith Commission was announced, Colin Fox protested the decision to "uniquely exclude" the SSP from proceedings. He wrote to the Smith Commission: "The argument some use to justify our exclusion on the grounds that we currently have no 'parliamentary representation' fails to appreciate that the referendum was not a parliamentary process, but an unprecedented public debate that resulted in an extraordinary level of engagement from all sections of society." The SSP made a written submission which called for wide-ranging fiscal autonomy, with all tax revenues raised in Scotland to be spent by the Scottish Parliament.

The SSP's annual conference in 2014 was the party's biggest conference in several years, and the first to be streamed live over the Internet. Members called for the abolition of the Offensive Behaviour Act, for fracking to be banned, a lowering of the State Pension age to 55, scrapping TTIP, and to support a pro-independence electoral alliance for the 2015 Westminster election in Scotland, which failed to emerge. The SSP started the process of mounting an SSP challenge in that election in November, while remaining "open to discussions" on a formal alliance until December. The SSP stood four candidates at the election on a manifesto pledging to introduce a £10 minimum wage, ban zero hour contracts, nationalise the energy industry – including oil and gas fields – and end austerity.

Following the party's failure to make a breakthrough at that election, the SSP's annual conference voted "to begin negotiations with other socialists about presenting an electoral alliance for 2016". By August, the party announced it would field candidates as part of RISE – Scotland's Left Alliance. SSP spokesman Colin Fox secured the support of former SNP depute leader Jim Sillars, who told The National: "If Colin Fox is on the list for Rise, I will be voting and supporting Colin Fox on the list system."

RISE also failed to win any seats in the Scottish Parliament. The SSP's subsequent conference in June 2016 passed a motion which "recommends the SSP re-evaluates our relationship with RISE to find a sustainable role for left unity going forward", while asserting that the party's priority over the coming year "must be to grow the influence and authority of the SSP itself". The party did not stand at either the 2017 snap general election or the following 2019 snap general election. For the first time since devolution the SSP also did not contest the 2021 Scottish Parliament election, either on their own or as part of a wider alliance.

The Young Scottish Socialists (YSS) was a youth wing affiliated with the party; however, in 2021 the YSS disbanded, and ex-members have since formed the Scottish Socialist Youth, which is not affiliated with the SSP.

=== Electoral return ===
The SSP stood candidates in the 2022 Scottish local elections. On 4 April 2022, the party launched its manifesto for the election. One of the core policies of the campaign is a plan to scrap council tax and replace it with an income-based alternative. The party claims the plan "not only shifts the burden of council funding from poor and average earners to the better-off, but generates an extra £2 billion for hard-pressed council services." The party's candidates have pledged to oppose all cuts to public services. Other commitments include demanding that 100,000 new homes for rent are built in the public sector in Scotland, demanding energy firms are returned to public ownership, demanding the restoration of the £20-a-week cut for Universal Credit recipients and that its councillors will campaign for a national minimum wage of £12 an hour. During these elections, National co-spokesperson Colin Fox stood in the ward of Liberton/Gilmerton in the City of Edinburgh. The party stood several other candidates in these elections: four in Glasgow, and one each in Paisley, Cumbernauld and Irvine. On 28 March 2025, Olivia Murphy stood as an SSP candidate in the Glasgow Southside Central by-election, gaining a higher voteshare than Reform UK, the Conservatives and the Liberal Democrats.

The SSP entered a period of increased activity in British parliament elections when Bill Bonnar stood for the party in the 2023 Rutherglen and Hamilton West by-election. The party also fielded candidates in Rutherglen and Glasgow East for the 2024 United Kingdom general election, their first contested general election since 2015.

In 2025, the party ended its hiatus in Scottish parliament elections by announcing that Collette Bradley, a trade union activist, would stand for the party in the Hamilton, Larkhall and Stonehouse by-election, and that it would field candidates in every electoral region in the 2026 Scottish Parliament election. They received 8,326 votes on the regional list, 0.36% of the vote, their highest total outside of an electoral alliance since 2007.

== Policies ==
=== Scottish independence ===
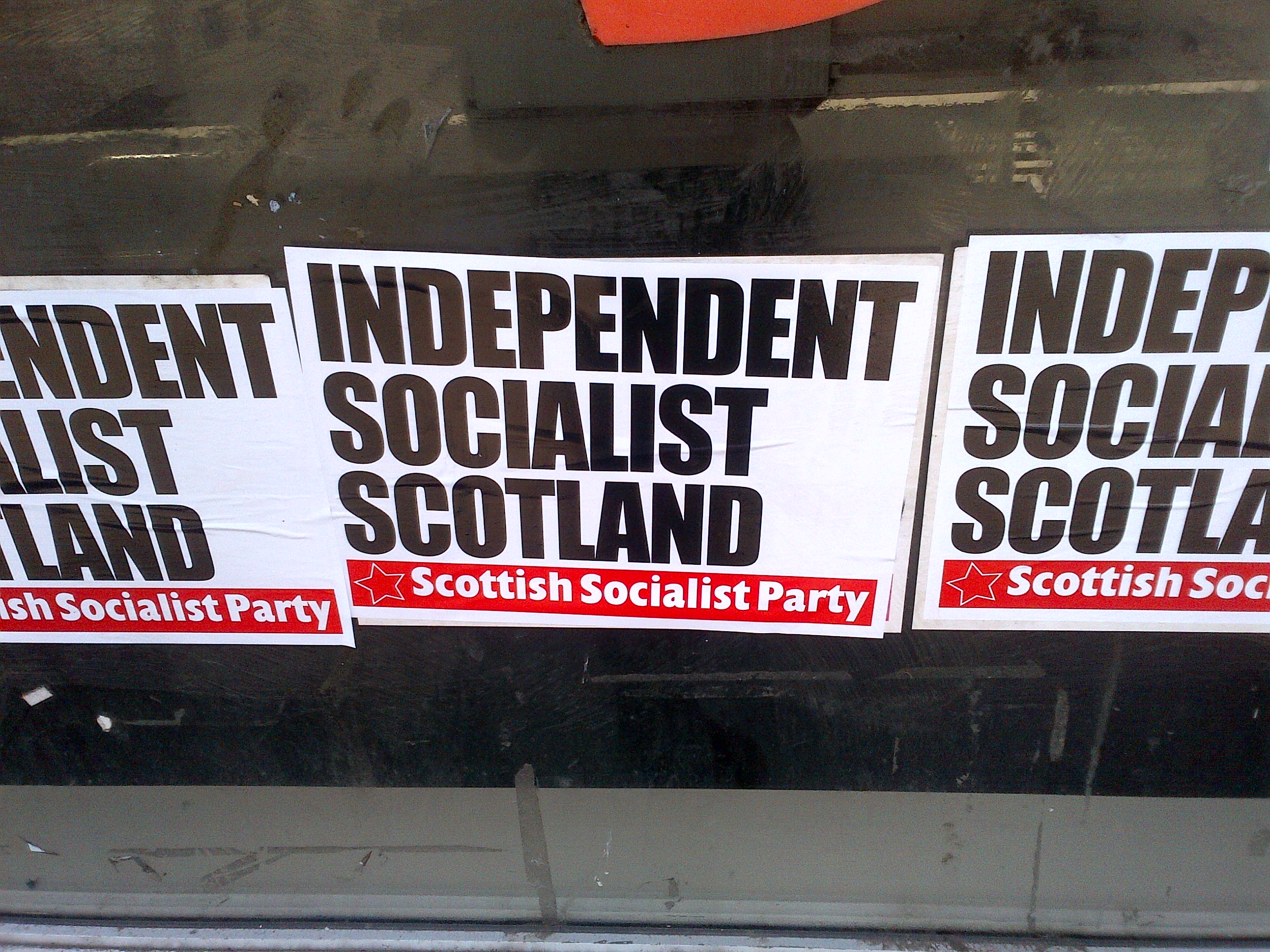
Fly poster for the SSP

The SSP strongly supports Scottish independence. It co-ordinated the rally for independence at Calton Hill in October 2004 and wrote the Declaration of Calton Hill, which sets out a vision of an inclusive and outward-looking republic. The party has argued the case for a Scottish socialist republic without a monarchy or nuclear weapons, with a greatly reduced level of military spending and a relationship with the European Union that safeguards Scotland's independence. Its support for a democratic republic and an independent currency is at odds with the SNP's opinion that the Union of the Crowns and use of the pound sterling should continue. SSP member and former Labour MP and MSP John McAllion has said socialists "cannot be fellow travellers on [the SNP's] road to independence".

The national self-determination sought by the SSP is driven by internationalist rather than nationalist concerns. It seeks to build an inclusive country which is run by and for the benefit of all who live in Scotland. As such, it supports the rights of asylum seekers to settle there, without fear of detention or deportation; opposes the expansion of the UK state, for example through ID cards; and seeks the abolition of the monarchy. Through prioritising independence as a key component in its political philosophy, it stands in the tradition of John Maclean, who set up the Scottish Workers Republican Party in the early part of the twentieth century, combining socialist economics with a goal of Scottish independence.

A referendum on Scottish independence was announced by the Scottish Government shortly after the Scottish National Party won an overall majority in the 2011 elections to the Scottish Parliament. The SSP campaigned for a "Yes" vote in that referendum, with its co-spokesperson Colin Fox sitting on the advisory board of Yes Scotland. In May 2013, Fox described a vote for independence as a "significant defeat for the British state and its stranglehold over our economy, society, culture and politics", as well as an opportunity to "[repudiate] neo-liberalism, corporatism, the financialisation of our economy and existing class relations". He added that he believed the referendum could be won "by persuading our fellow Scots of independence's transformational potential".

=== Europe ===
As of 2026, the SSP officially advocates for Scotland's membership of institutions such as the European Union and the EFTA to be decided democratically after independence has been achieved.

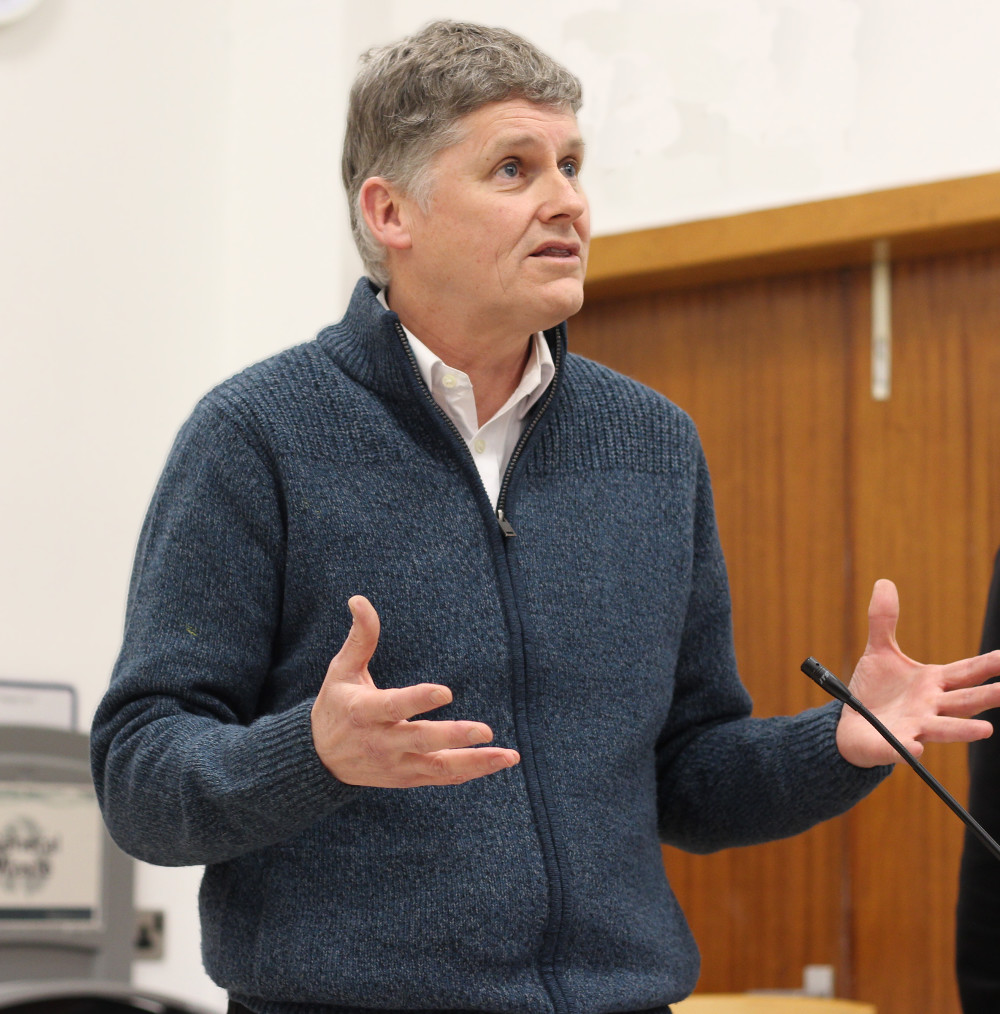
National spokesman Colin Fox arguing the position for a socialist Europe

In the time surrounding the 2014 and 2016 referendums on Scottish independence and British EU membership respectively, the party supported Scotland's continued membership of the European Union, though condemned its structure as a "neoliberal trap" and "an undemocratic, capitalist institution that puts big business interests before workers". The SSP's 2015 manifesto reiterated the party's commitment to "working in a pan-European socialist alliance to achieve our goal of a socialist federation of European nations", while maintaining there would be no "greater democratic and economic progress" for workers outside the EU compared to within it.

In February 2016, the party re-affirmed its position at a National Council meeting in Dundee. It agreed to back the UK's continued EU membership in the 2016 United Kingdom European Union membership referendum and to "campaign for a socialist Europe which is democratic, pursues peace in the world rather than warmongering, welcomes refugees, and above all where the riches of the continent are shared out equally between all its 500 million citizens".

=== Foreign policy ===
The Scottish Socialist Party aims to withdraw Scotland from NATO and sign the United Nations Treaty on the Prohibition of Nuclear Weapons. The party describes itself as anti-imperialist, and its foreign policy is broadly opposed to the United States and those within its sphere of influence. The SSP condemns the 2003 invasion of Iraq, the Saudi war on Yemen, Israel's genocide in Gaza and American interference in the Western Hemisphere, including their 2026 blockade of Cuba and use of sanctions against Venezuela.

=== Local government taxation ===
The Scottish Socialist Party proposes a national income-based service tax to replace council tax. The council tax, which was brought in after Margaret Thatcher's poll tax became non-viable, is based on the value of the household in which the taxpayer lives; the party argues this can lead to unfairly high taxation for tenants and pensioners.

In 2004, the SSP launched its "Scrap the Council Tax" campaign, boosted by a poll suggesting 77% of people in Scotland supported the abolition of the tax. A bill proposing a progressive system of taxation based on a household's income was presented in 2005, but was defeated with 12 MSPs in favour, 94 against, and 6 abstaining. Although the Scottish Liberal Democrats, the Scottish National Party, and the Scottish Greens supported the concept of income-based taxation, all three parties disagreed with the SSP's specific proposals, which would have exempted anyone with an annual income of less than £10,000 and reduced liabilities for anyone with an annual income of less than £30,000, while targeting revenue generation to those with household incomes in excess of £90,000.

=== Free school meals ===
MSP Frances Curran led a campaign which included children's and anti-poverty organisations for the provision of free and nutritious meals for all to tackle the problems of poor diet and rising obesity amongst children. This claimed to be able to eradicate the stigma associated with the current means-tested system and also ensure that meals provided in school conformed to minimal nutritional standards.

A bill to this effect was proposed in parliament in 2002, but was defeated. However, a subsequent Scottish Executive consultation found that 96% of respondents were in favour of free school meals. A redrafted bill was launched in October 2006 and was resubmitted to the parliament, but it was announced in November 2006 that this bill would not be taken in that session of parliament due to time pressures. Frances Curran had pledged that the SSP would resubmit its bill early in the next session of parliament and announced a text service for supporters to text Jack McConnell to demonstrate their support for the free school meals bill. However, the SSP's exit from Parliament at the 2007 election prevented this.

The Scottish National Party introduced free school meals as a pilot scheme for a small number of primary school pupils in selected local authorities and have announced that there will be free school meals for Primary 1-3 children from 2010, however they have not backed the wholesale change that the SSP proposed.

=== Public transport ===
The SSP has proposed free public transport within Scotland, which they claim will reduce carbon emissions, cut road deaths, reduce air pollution and boost the incomes of workers reliant on public transport. The capital costs involved in the project would, they say, be raised by reducing planned roadbuilding programmes, and ring-fencing all money raised by government and local authorities from parking meters and car parks.

Such a scheme in Hasselt, Belgium, revived by the provision of free public transport, and was a key plank of the Greater London Council's policy platform in the early 1980s. Tallinn, the capital of Estonia, introduced free public transport for residents in April 2013 to considerable economic benefit, adding more precedent for the SSP's policy of free public transport. In 2020, Luxembourg became the first country to make all public transport (busses, trains and trams) free across the entire country.

The SSP also aim to establish a Scottish National Bus Corporation, which would be publicly owned and democratically run by regional boards. Privately run bus corporations would also be re-regulated. On the expiration of the First ScotRail franchise in November 2014, the SSP called for it to be transferred to a publicly owned and democratically managed Scottish National Rail Corporation.

=== Healthcare and drugs ===
In 2005, MSP Colin Fox proposed a bill to abolish NHS prescription charges. The bill was voted down by Labour, Conservative, and Liberal Democrat MSPs. In response to the bill's introduction and the publicity that it generated, the Scottish Executive announced a review of the impact that the charges had on the chronically sick and full-time students—just three hours prior to the bill being debated. Prescription charges were eventually abolished on 1 April 2011 through SNP legislation. Nicola Sturgeon wrote to Colin Fox to acknowledge the SSP's contribution in the campaign for abolishing prescription charges.

The SSP has proposed the legalisation of cannabis and the licensing of premises to sell cannabis as a means of breaking the link between soft drugs and potentially lethal drugs such as heroin. It has also proposed the provision of synthetic heroin on NHS Scotland under medical supervision in order to undermine the black market for drugs and combat the social and health problems caused by illegal drug use in working-class communities, as well as calling for the expansion of residential rehabilitation and detoxification facilities for addicts seeking treatment. The party also supports the decriminalisation of drugs, instead advocating an evidence and healthcare led approach to the matter.

=== National Care Service ===
The SSP calls for a publicly owned and publicly funded National Care Service that would be free at the point of use (like the NHS). The party says this would help end what it describes as "poverty pay" for care workers, provide greater job security and would help provide a greater level of scrutiny for care homes to help avoid abuse and neglect and provide high quality care. The attention on the matter of care homes and their running grew in media attention during the COVID-19 pandemic with reports of 2,000 deaths in Scottish care homes. One of the party's spokespersons, Colin Fox, wrote that private care is "not only prohibitively expensive, despite huge subsidies from the public purse, but often of poor quality and saturated by poor working conditions and wage rates". He also said that "The case for a National Care Service [...] is supported by eminent public health clinicians such as Professor Allyson Pollock of Newcastle University".

=== Other ===
The SSP supports a universal basic income. It also supports LGBTQ+ rights, and co-spokesperson Colin Fox has stated his support for the Gender Recognition Reform Bill. The party is avowedly anti-racist and aims to combat racism at a structural level.

== Campaigns ==
=== £15 an hour minimum wage ===
The SSP is currently involved in a campaign to raise the national minimum wage to £15 per hour, for everyone aged sixteen years old and over. The party has, since its foundation, called for the minimum wage to be set at two-thirds of the male median salary. The party claims this would be easily affordable, as most people in Scotland being paid the minimum wage are "employed by retail giants, including supermarkets, who make billions in profit every year, and could easily afford a decent living wage for those who make them their profits. Likewise, the big chains in the fast foods and hospitality sector". The party claims that by having a higher minimum wage, people would feel more secure, and in turn spend more; which would invest in local economies.

=== Anti-war campaigns ===
The SSP campaigned against the wars in Iraq and Afghanistan, and was one of the founding members of the Scottish Coalition for Justice not War in September 2001.

It worked closely with Military Families Against the War, particularly in the Justice 4 Gordon Gentle campaign, standing down at the 2005 general election for Rose Gentle in the East Kilbride constituency. In 2009, the grandmother of Dundee soldier Kevin Elliot, who died in Afghanistan, joined the party because she regarded it as having a strong anti-war stance. The party has also campaigned against rendition flights, including introducing a debate in the Scottish Parliament over the issue, and against the lack of response from the UK government in Israel's war in Lebanon.

It has supported non-violent direct action as a tactic to oppose the presence of weapons of mass destruction in Scotland and strongly opposes the replacement of Trident. It has participated in the blockades at Faslane nuclear base since its inception and a number of SSP members have been fined and/or jailed after blockading the naval base at the annual Big Blockade. In 2005, Rosie Kane locked herself on to a 25-foot (7.5-metre) Trident replica outside the Scottish Parliament, only releasing herself after the replica was dismantled fourteen hours later. Later that year she was fined £150 for her actions and in October 2006, she was jailed for fourteen days after refusing to pay the fine. In January 2007, three SSP MSPs were arrested, later released without charge. In June 2007, five members of the SSP's youth wing were also arrested, according to the Left Click Blog and held overnight, after blockading the base as part of the Faslane365 campaign. The party supported the Scrap Trident demonstration in Glasgow in April 2013.

The SSP defends the right of the Palestinian people to self-determination, and supports the Boycott, Divestment and Sanctions movement. An SSP councillor convinced West Dunbartonshire Council to add its support to the BDS movement in 2009.

== Publications ==
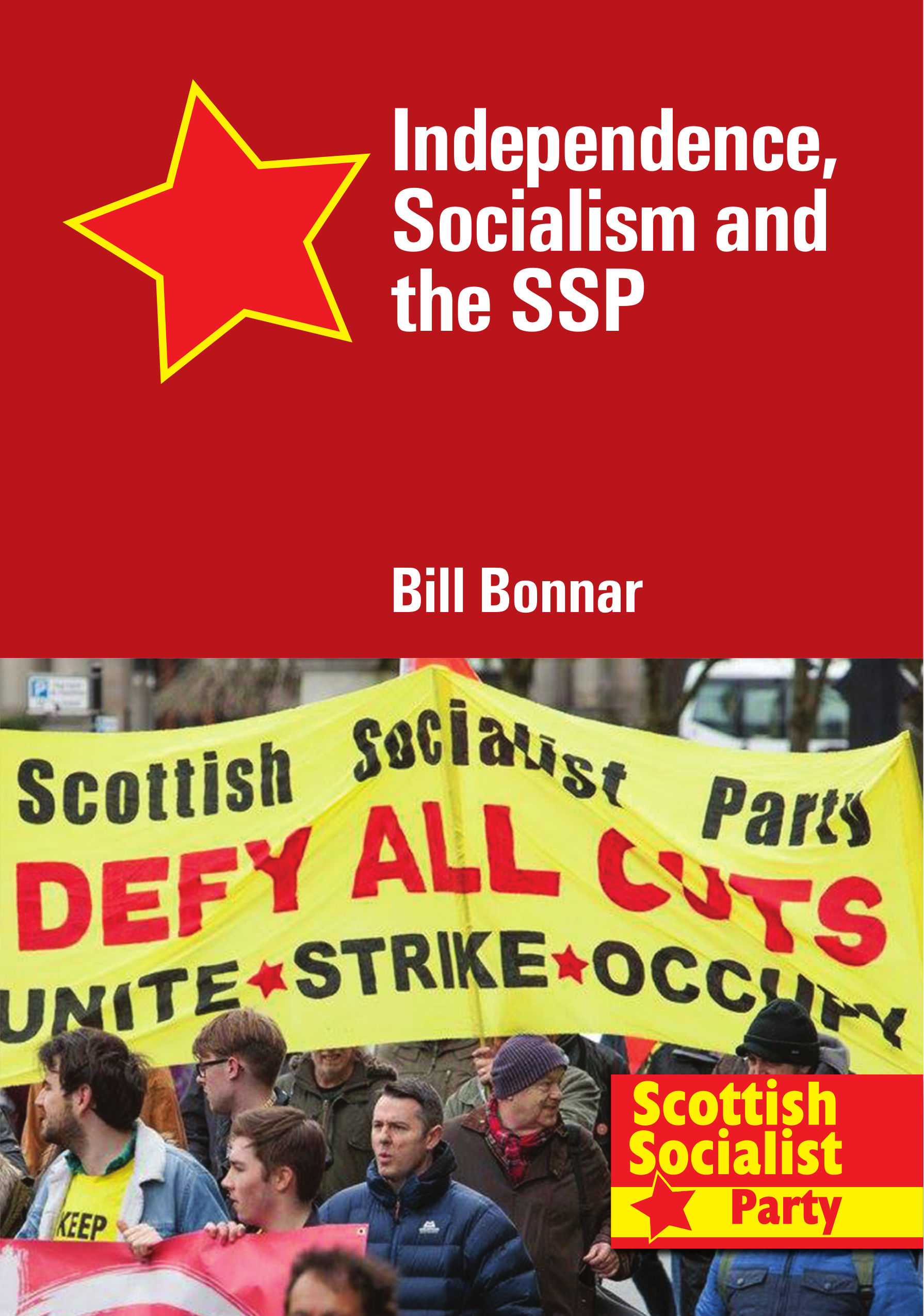
Independence, Socialism and the SSP pamphlet cover

Alongside the Scottish Socialist Voice, the party has published a number of pamphlets setting various policy positions in greater detail than in the party's election manifestos. A pamphlet called The Case for an Independent Socialist Scotland, was launched on 11 September 2013 and was welcomed by MSPs.

The party's published pamphlets since 2013 include the following:

- The Case for an Independent Socialist Scotland by Colin Fox (ISBN 978-0-9571986-1-6)
- End Fuel Poverty and Power Company Profiteering by Colin Fox (ISBN 978-0-9571986-0-9)
- For a Modern Democratic Republic by Colin Fox (ISBN 978-0-9571986-9-2)
- UKIP, Europe & Immigration: A Socialist Perspective by Colin Fox (ISBN 978-0-9571986-8-5)
- Independence, Socialism and the SSP by Bill Bonnar
- 1917: Walls Come Tumbling Down by Richie Venton
- Class Not Creed, 1968: Ireland's lost opportunity for socialism, not sectarianism by Richie Venton (ISBN 978-0-9571986-2-3)

In 2015, the party published Break the Chains, a book by SSP workplace organiser Richie Venton in which he argues the case for an immediate £10 an hour minimum wage, without discrimination; a national maximum wage; a shorter working week; and strategies to "unchain the unions".

== Election results ==
=== Scottish Parliament ===
Election	No. of list votes	% of list vote	No. of overall seats won	+/−	Position	Notes
1999	46,635	2.0 (7th)	1 / 129	—N/a	5th	
2003	128,026	6.7 (6th)	6 / 129	▲5	6th	
2007	12,731	0.6 (13th)	0 / 129	▼6	—N/a	
2011	8,272	0.4 (12th)	0 / 129	0	—N/a	
2016	10,911	0.5 (9th)	0 / 129	0	—N/a	Total result for RISE – Scotland's Left Alliance
2021	—N/a	—N/a	—N/a	Did not stand any candidates	—N/a	
2026	8,326	0.36 (11th)	0 / 129	0	11th	

=== United Kingdom Parliament ===
Election	No. of candidates	No. of votes	% of vote	Notes
2001	72	72,516	3.1 (5th)	
2005	58	43,514	1.9 (5th)	
2010	10	3,157	0.1 (9th)	
2015	4	895	0.03 (10th)	Chose to stand in small number of seats after electoral alliance talks failed
2017	—N/a	—N/a	—N/a	Did not stand any candidates
2019	—N/a	—N/a	—N/a	Did not stand any candidates
2024	2	1,007		

=== European Parliament ===
Election	No. of votes	% of vote	+/−	Notes
1999	39,720	4.0 (6th)	—N/a	
2004	61,356	5.2 (7th)	▲1.2	
2009	10,404	0.9 (10th)	▼4.3	
2014	—N/a	—N/a	—N/a	Did not stand
2019	—N/a	—N/a	—N/a	Did not stand

== See also ==
- List of Scottish Socialist Party members of the Scottish Parliament
- List of advocates of republicanism in the United Kingdom
- List of political parties in the United Kingdom opposed to austerity
- Radical Independence Campaign
