= Colin Fox (politician) =

Scottish politician (born 1959)

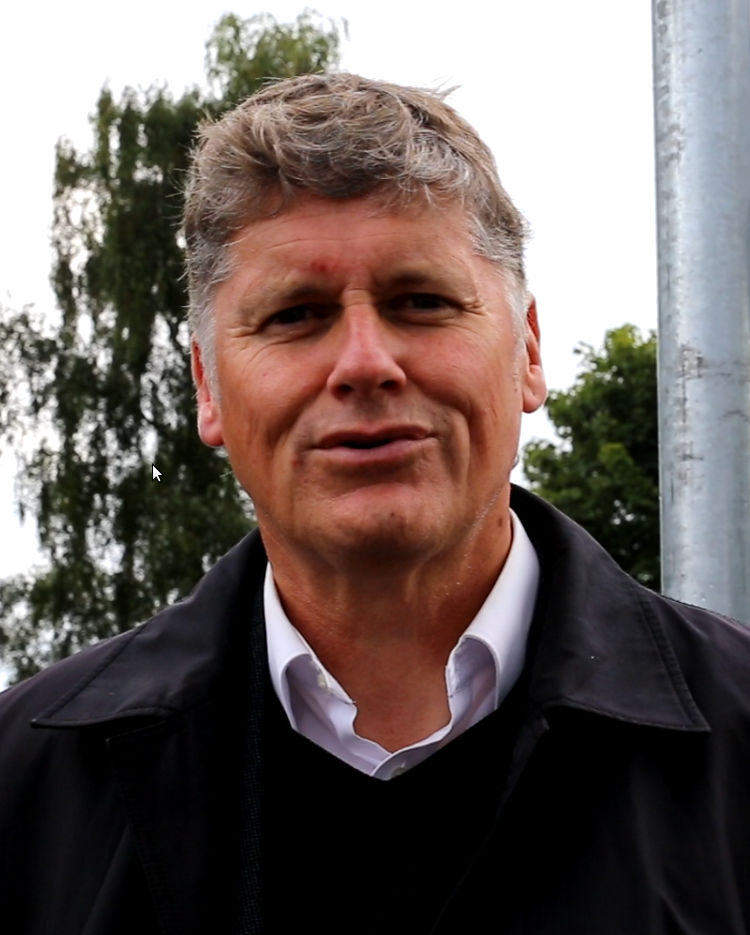
- Fox in 2015

Scottish Socialist Party co-spokesperson
- Incumbent
- Assumed office 13 February 2005
- Preceded by: Tommy Sheridan

Member of the Scottish Parliament for Lothians
- In office 1 May 2003 – 2 April 2007

Personal details
- Born: 17 June 1959 (age 67) Motherwell, Scotland
- Party: Scottish Socialist Party (1998–present)
- Other political affiliations: Scottish Labour (1970s–1991); Scottish Militant Labour (1991–1998)

Colin Fox (born 17 June 1959) is a Scottish socialist politician and left-wing activist, serving as national co-spokesperson of the Scottish Socialist Party (SSP) since 2005. He was a Member of the Scottish Parliament (MSP) for the Lothians region from 2003 to 2007.

Described in The Herald as "one of Scotland's most prominent socialists", he is a founding member of the SSP and Scotland's longest-serving party leader or spokesperson, having been originally elected as the SSP's convener in February 2005. He was a member of the Yes Scotland Advisory Board.

== Personal life ==
Fox was born in Motherwell. Both of his grandfathers were steelworkers, his mother was a nurse and his father an insurance salesman with the Co-operative Insurance Society. He attended Our Lady's High School before studying Mathematics at Strathclyde University and Accountancy at Bell's College, Hamilton (now part of the University of the West of Scotland). He graduated with a BSc (Hons) in Social Sciences from the Open University in 2013.

Colin currently lives in Edinburgh, with his partner and children.

== Political career ==
Fox joined Scottish Labour in Motherwell and Wishaw as a teenager and established Labour Party Young Socialists (LPYS) branches throughout Lanarkshire.

He has described Tony Benn as "one of [his] heroes", and says that it was after attending a talk given by Benn at the University of Glasgow, when Benn was running for the Deputy Leadership of the Labour Party, that he was inspired to get involved in politics full-time. As a prominent LPYS activist, he attracted the attention of the Militant tendency, and joined in 1981. He was elected as their Lanarkshire organiser in 1983 and has been heavily involved in socialist politics ever since.

He was active in the 1984–1985 miners's strike in Ayrshire and at the Ravenscraig picket line. The 103-day Caterpillar occupation of 1987–88 saw him involved in the key industrial battle of the time. In 1988, he went to London to work for Militant at its headquarters in Hackney Wick. He held a variety of posts in its industrial department, finance department, and as circulation manager of the Militant newspaper. Here, he was heavily involved in the leadership of the anti-poll tax struggle which brought down Margaret Thatcher.

In 1995, he moved to Edinburgh to take up the role of Scottish Militant Labour's East of Scotland organiser. This was the time when Militant was discarding its entryist tactics and turning towards open mass work. As a member of SML's executive committee, he was heavily involved in the discussions with some smaller groups on the left that led to the formation of the Scottish Socialist Alliance (SSA) in 1995.

The SSA aimed to build a left-wing alternative to New Labour and the SNP. It was built around the slogan "for an independent socialist Scotland". Fox was the SSA's East of Scotland organiser, a role he continued to play when the Alliance morphed into the Scottish Socialist Party (SSP) in 1998.

=== An MSP in Holyrood ===
He led the Scottish Socialist Party in the Lothians into the first Scottish Parliament election in 1999. This was the election where Tommy Sheridan, then an SML councillor, was elected as the SSP MSP for Glasgow region. Over the course of the next four years, Colin helped build the SSP as it trebled in size.

The party in parliament succeeded in passing legislation to abolish poindings and warrant sales in 2002. Using Sheridan's popularity, the SSP made several interventions including supporting the Fire Brigades Union dispute of 2002. But above all, it was the role the party played in the huge movement against the Iraq War that cemented the SSP's place in Scottish politics. Against pundits' predictions, the SSP won six seats at Holyrood in 2003, including Fox in the Lothians region. Winning by just 68 votes out of 300,000, Fox was famously captured on TV hurtling across the floor of Meadowbank Stadium in Edinburgh when his result was finally declared.

Like his SSP colleagues, Fox refused to swear an oath of allegiance to the Queen and was ejected from the swearing-in ceremony for singing Robert Burns' anthem Is There for Honest Poverty (or A Man's a Man for A' That) in protest.

He sat on the Scottish Parliament's justice committee for four years and visited many of Scotland's prisons, arguing for reform. He presented a Member's Bill, one of only six to get to the debating floor that session, to abolish National Health Service prescription charges in Scotland. The bill won the backing of the parliament's health committee, but was eventually voted down by Labour, Conservative, and Lib Dem MSPs. The Scottish Government of 2007–11 later picked up the bill and introduced it themselves.

=== Sheridan's defamation action ===
Sheridan, the party's then national convenor, chose to sue a tabloid newspaper in November 2004 over stories it published about his private life. Sheridan's decision to sue the News of the World, against the advice of the SSP executive committee, led to it demanding his resignation as convenor. Sheridan lied in his trials and was eventually sentenced to three years in jail, convicted on five counts of perjury.

On one occasion, Sheridan asked Fox to lie on his behalf by writing to his solicitor saying minutes of a party meeting where Sheridan admitted going to a swingers' club were false. Fox refused and told Sheridan his strategy was a "train wreck". Colin Fox later summarised Sheridan's conduct by saying he had "done more damage to the socialist cause than any good he ever did it".

Fox was subsequently elected SSP national convener in Sheridan's place, defeating Alan McCombes by 252 votes to 154, but the damage done to the party by the Glasgow MSP was substantial.

In response to Tony Blair's plans to bring in variable top-up fees at English universities, Fox commented that previous student politicians, such as Jack Straw and Charles Clarke, "were only able to be active in student politics because they didn't have £10,000 of debt hanging round their neck and they didn't have to rush off to work in McDonald's". He added: "Now they are kicking the ladder away from the people below them."

In June 2005, Fox took part in a peaceful protest, interrupting Question Time in the Scottish Parliament, along with three other SSP MSPs, to highlight their claim that parliament had failed to secure the right to demonstrate outside the Gleneagles Hotel where the G8 were meeting. As a consequence, he was suspended from the Scottish Parliament for the whole of September and the salaries of the party's four MSPs and their staff were stopped—the severest penalty meted out to any peaceful protest in British parliamentary history.

=== Exit from parliament ===
Fox lost his seat in the Scottish Parliament at the 2007 election, but continued to lead the party, campaigning on issues including Scottish independence, fuel poverty, bankers' bonuses, the occupation of Afghanistan, climate change, equal marriage, AIDS, and education cuts. He has contested a number of elections since 2007, standing as his party's top candidate in the 2009 European elections, in the Lothians region for the Scottish Parliament elections in 2007 and 2011, and against Alistair Darling in Edinburgh South West at the 2010 United Kingdom general election.

In 2007, he supported Greenpeace on board their ship Arctic Sunrise in their campaign against the replacement of the UK's nuclear weapons. He had previously visited a nuclear power station on the grounds that "I am a convinced opponent of nuclear power but an opponent who wants to conduct the debate about new nuclear capacity and our energy needs on the basis of facts. My visit to Torness is at my own request." In the same year he championed the cause of affordable access to housing with his support of Midlothian Council's investment in providing housing.

In 2008, he wrote to the First Minister Alex Salmond seeking an assurance that any future meetings with members of the Northern Ireland Assembly would raise the issue of attitudes towards LGBT rights by its ministers. More recently he has also been involved in opposing community education cuts, and has marched against cuts to public services.

In 2012, Fox was invited to join the Yes Scotland Advisory Board as a representative of the SSP when the campaign was launched.

=== Independence referendum ===
As a Yes Scotland Advisory Board member, Colin Fox was in great demand to speak at public meetings on the details of independence all across Scotland. He has shared platforms with Jim Sillars, John McAllion, John Finnie MSP, Jean Urquhart MSP, and Patrick Harvie MSP of the Scottish Greens. He wrote the SSP's pamphlets The Case for an Independent Socialist Scotland and For a Modern Democratic Republic.

Fox addressed independence rallies in Edinburgh in 2012 and 2013, and spoke at the Oxford Union in May 2014 debating the motion: "This House believes Scotland should be an independent country". His opponents in the debate included Lord Jim Wallace and the Labour MP for Stirling, Anne McGuire.

In June 2014, Fox wrote in the Scotsman: "No country in the world is more engaged in the democratic debate over self-determination than Scotland today. September’s referendum has energised people to a remarkable extent with debates on the 'democratic deficit' at the heart of Scottish politics now taking place in households, schools, workplaces, village halls and urban community centres from one end of the country to the other."

=== After the referendum ===
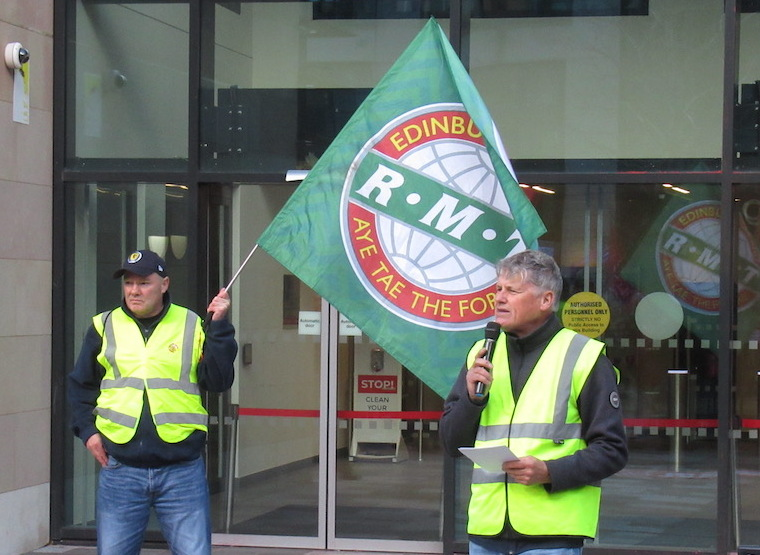
Fox (right) at a rally in October 2022

When the make-up of the Smith Commission was announced after the rejection of independence, Colin Fox protested the decision to "uniquely exclude" the SSP from proceedings. He wrote to the Smith Commission: "The argument some use to justify our exclusion on the grounds that we currently have no 'parliamentary representation' fails to appreciate that the referendum was not a parliamentary process but an unprecedented public debate that resulted in an extraordinary level of engagement from all sections of society. To exclude the SSP is to exclude an important constituency of opinion in Scottish society."

In January 2015, Fox travelled to Athens as a guest of Syriza before its victory in the January 2015 Greek legislative election. He met with Syriza leader Alexis Tsipras and Podemos leader Pablo Iglesias Turrión, and said the election result was "something for socialists in Scotland to ponder deeply".

=== 2022 City of Edinburgh Council election ===
Fox stood as a candidate for the Scottish Socialist Party in the Liberton/Gilmerton ward in the 2022 City of Edinburgh Council election.

== Other activities ==
Fox is the founder and current director of the Edinburgh People's Festival.

In October 2008, Fox stood for Rector of the University of St Andrews. He came second, losing to Kevin Dunion. He was asked to run for the position by members of St Andrews-based student groups such as Stop The War, due to his previous experience with the pro-peace and social justice movements. After losing the rectorial election in 2008, he maintained his links with the University and visited a student sit-in protest in 2009. He was invited to stand for election as rector again in 2011.
