= List of British republicans =

Supporters of republicanism in the United Kingdom—replacing the country's monarchy with a republic—typically favour an elected head of state to a constitutional monarch who heads the British royal family. (Note: The following list includes notable figures and groups who have advocated for this position. It excludes those who have since disclaimed their support for republicanism, or retracted such statements.)

== Individuals (living) ==
=== Politicians (serving) ===
- Rhun ap Iorwerth, First Minister of Wales, MS, and leader of Plaid Cymru
- Natalie Bennett, peer and former leader of the Green Party of England and Wales
- Lara Bird, MP (SNP)
- Richard Burgon, MP (Labour)
- Maggie Chapman, MSP (Scottish Greens)
- Katy Clark, MSP (Scottish Labour), peer and former MP (Labour)
- Tom Copley, Deputy Mayor of London for Housing and Residential Development and former AM (Labour Co-op)
- Jeremy Corbyn, MP (Your Party) and former leader of the Labour Party
- Iris Duane, MSP (Scottish Greens)
- Mark Ferguson, MP (Labour)
- Stephen Flynn, MSP (SNP)
- Zöe Garbett, Mayor of Hackney (Green Party)
- Ross Greer, MSP (Scottish Greens)
- Nia Griffith, MP (Labour)
- Llyr Gruffydd, MS (Plaid Cymru)
- Peter Hain, peer and former MP (Labour)
- Patrick Harvie, MSP and co-leader of the Scottish Greens
- Elin Jones, MS (Plaid Cymru) and former Llywydd (Presiding Officer) of the Senedd
- Clive Lewis, MP (Labour)
- Gillian Mackay, MSP (Scottish Greens)
- John McDonnell, MP (Labour)
- Paul McLennan, MSP (SNP)
- Zack Polanski, leader of the Green Party of England and Wales and Member of the London Assembly
- Ken Skates, MS (Welsh Labour)
- Lorna Slater, MSP and co-leader of the Scottish Greens
- Andy Slaughter, MP (Labour)
- Anthony Slaughter, MS (Green Party of England and Wales)
- Cat Smith, MP (Labour)

=== Politicians (former) ===
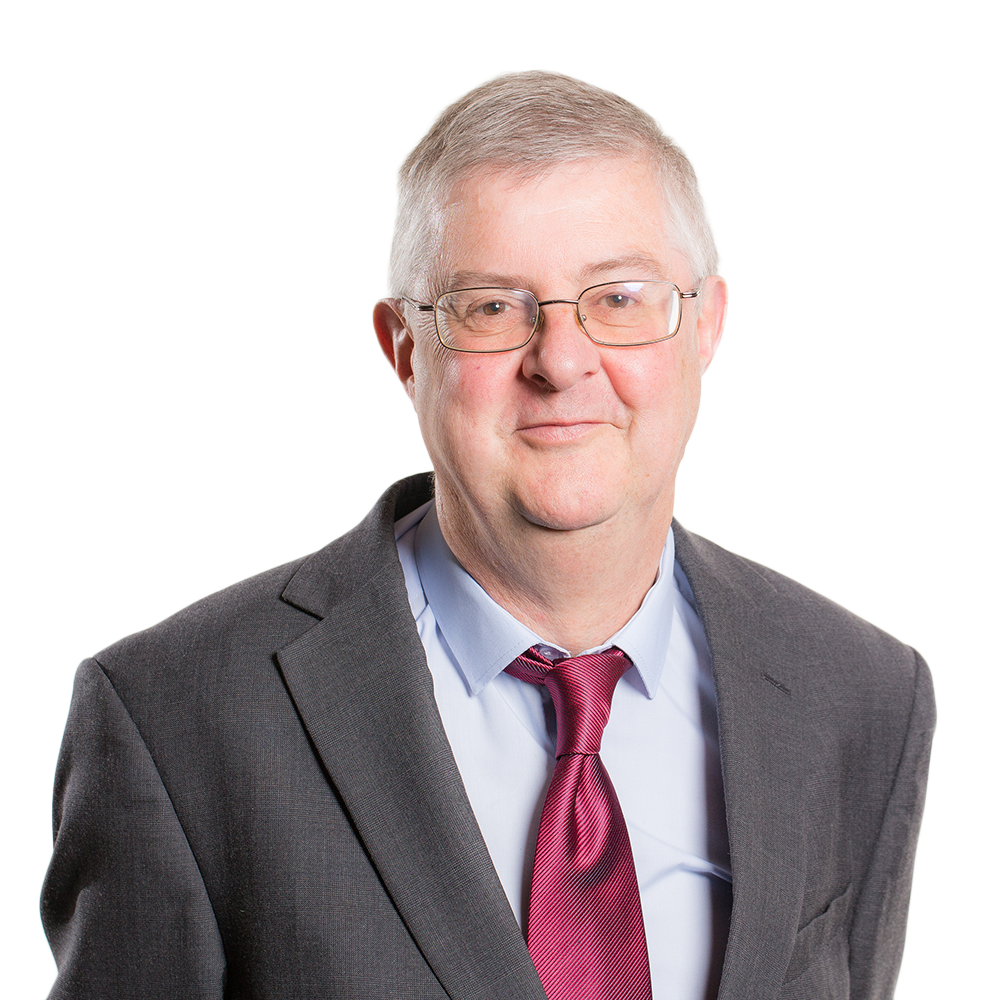
Mark Drakeford

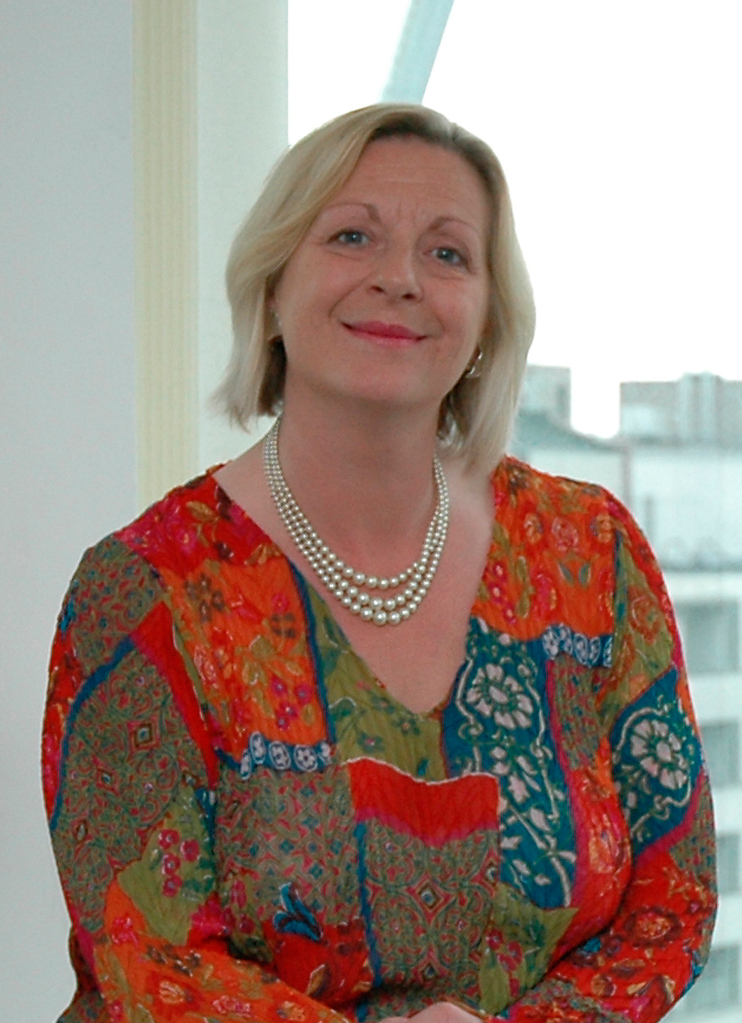
Linda Fabiani

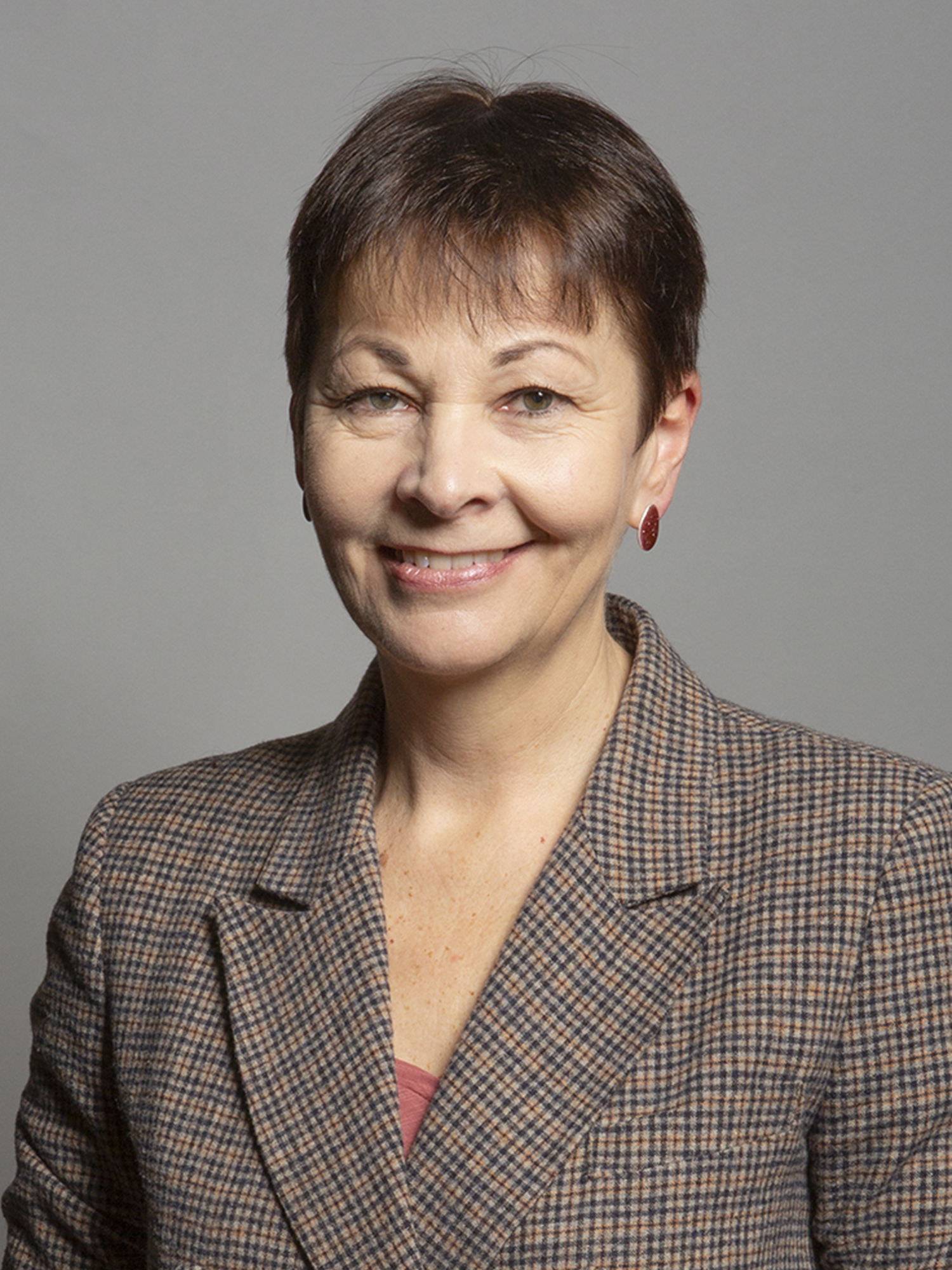
Caroline Lucas

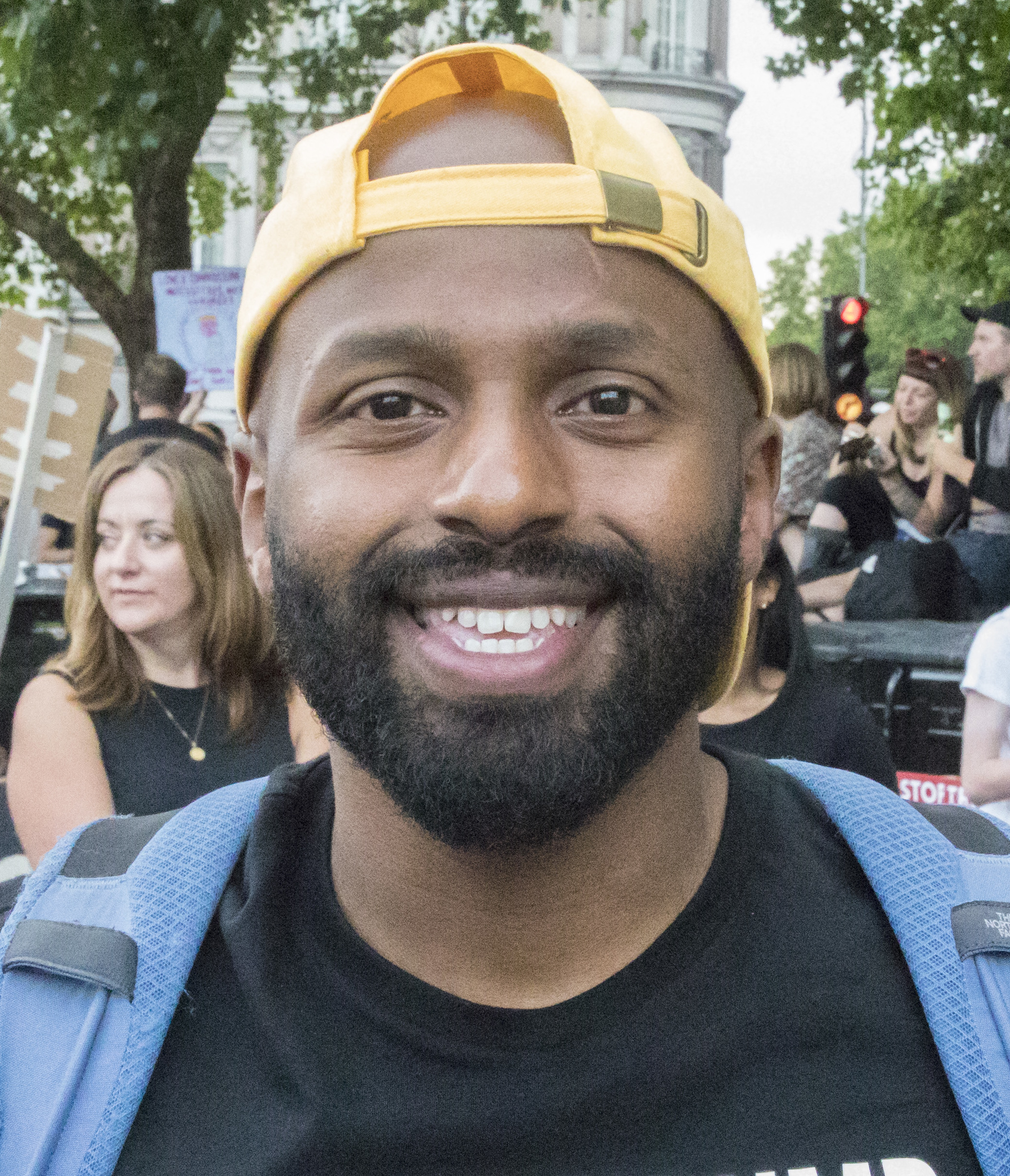
Magid Magid

- Norman Baker, former MP (Liberal Democrats)
- Jonathan Bartley, theologian and former co-leader of the Green Party of England and Wales
- John Biggs, former Labour mayor of Tower Hamlets
- Mhairi Black, former MP (Scottish National Party)
- Steven Bonnar, former MP (Scottish National Party)
- Russell Brown, former MP (Labour)
- Rosemary Byrne, former MSP (Scottish Socialist Party)
- Ronnie Campbell, former MP (Labour)
- Michael Clapham, former MP (Labour)
- David Crausby, former MP (Labour)
- Roseanna Cunningham, former MSP (SNP)
- Frances Curran, former MSP (Scottish Socialist Party)
- Ian Davidson, former MP (Labour)
- Ron Davies, former MP (Labour), Independent councillor and political activist (Plaid Cymru)
- Emma Dent Coad, former MP (Labour)
- Mark Drakeford, former MS, leader of Welsh Labour and First Minister of Wales
- Bill Etherington, former MP (Labour)
- Linda Fabiani, former MSP (SNP)
- Colin Fox, former MSP (Scottish Socialist Party)
- George Galloway, former MP (Labour, Respect, Workers Party) and leader of the Workers Party
- Rob Gibson, former MSP (SNP)
- Roger Godsiff, former MP (Labour)
- Christine Grahame, MSP (SNP)
- John Griffiths, former MS (Welsh Labour)
- David Hanson, former MP (Labour)
- Neale Hanvey, former MP (Alba and SNP)
- Derek Hatton, former deputy leader of Liverpool City Council (Labour)
- John Heppell, former MP (Labour)
- Kelvin Hopkins, former MP (Labour)
- Julian Huppert, former MP (Liberal Democrats)
- Brian Iddon, former MP (Labour)
- Lynne Jones, former MP (Labour)
- Rosie Kane, former MSP (Scottish Socialist Party)
- Carolyn Leckie, former MSP (Scottish Socialist Party)
- Ken Livingstone, former mayor of London and Labour MP
- Caroline Lucas, former MEP, MP and co-leader of the Green Party of England and Wales
- Andrew MacKinlay, former MP (Labour) and councillor (Liberal Democrats)
- Denis MacShane, author and former MP (Labour)
- Magid Magid, former MEP (Green Party of England and Wales) and Lord Mayor of Sheffield
- Bob Marshall-Andrews, barrister and former MP (Labour)
- John McAllion, former MP and MSP (Labour)
- Stewart McDonald, former MP (SNP)
- Chris McEleny, former councillor (Alba and SNP)
- Natalie McGarry, former MP (SNP and Independent)
- Jim McGovern, former MP (Labour)
- Ann McKechin, former MP (Labour)
- Anne McLaughlin, former MP (SNP)
- Chris Mullin, former MP (Labour)
- Doug Naysmith, former MP (Labour)
- Stephen Pound, former MP (Labour)
- Gordon Prentice, former MP (Labour)
- Ash Regan, former MSP (Alba and SNP)
- Ken Ritchie, former Labour councillor, psephologist and founder of Labour for a Republic
- Phil Sawford, former MP (Labour)
- Bethan Sayed, former MS (Plaid Cymru)
- Tommy Sheppard, former MP (SNP)
- Tommy Sheridan, former MSP (Scottish Socialist Party)
- Jim Sillars, former MP (Labour and SNP)
- Dennis Skinner, former MP (Labour)
- Nicola Sturgeon, former MSP (SNP), First Minister of Scotland and leader of the Scottish National Party
- Adam Tomkins, former MSP (Conservative)
- Jean Urquhart, former MSP (SNP and Independent)
- Mercedes Villalba, former MSP (Scottish Labour)
- Graham Watson, former MEP (Liberal Democrats)
- Sandra White, former MSP (SNP)
- Chris Williamson, former MP (Labour and Independent)
- Bill Wilson, former MSP (SNP) and political activist (Scottish Greens)
- Leanne Wood, former MS (former leader of Plaid Cymru)
- Humza Yousaf, former MSP (SNP), First Minister of Scotland and leader of the Scottish National Party

=== Political activists ===
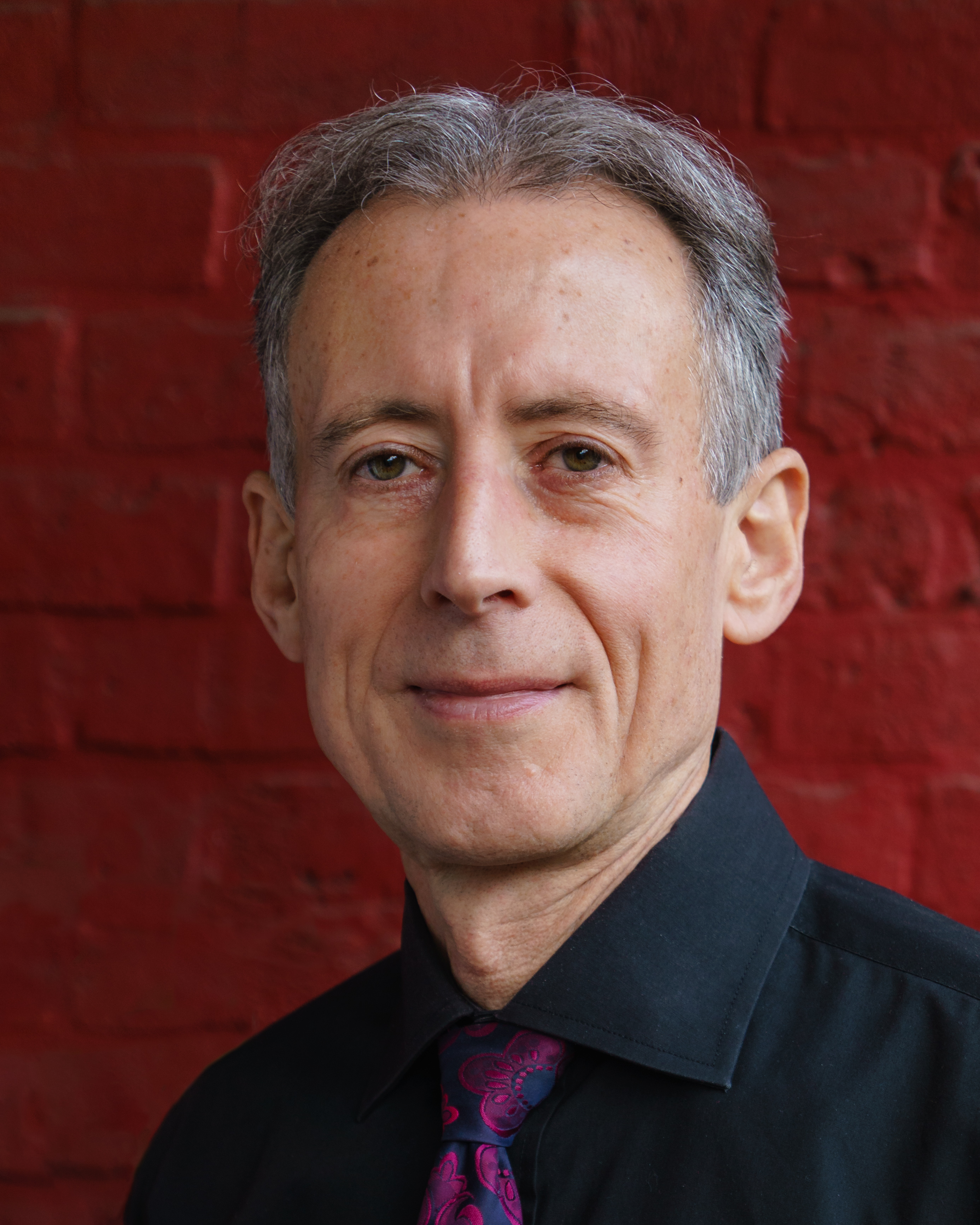
Peter Tatchell

- Tariq Ali, author and political activist
- Jamie Bevan, Welsh language activist
- Julie Bindel, writer and political activist
- Bill Bonnar, Scottish Socialist Party campaigner
- Catherine Mayer, author and co-founder of the Women's Equality Party
- Alan McCombes, Scottish Socialist Party campaigner
- Craig Murray, former diplomat and activist
- Mike Small, Scottish author and activist
- Peter Tatchell, gay rights campaigner
- Kevin Williamson, Scottish writer and activist

=== Political staff and advisors ===
- Alastair Campbell, political strategist, journalist and author
- Philip Collins, journalist and former chief speechwriter to Tony Blair
- Andrew Fisher, political adviser and consultant
- Lance Price, writer, journalist and former political adviser to Tony Blair

=== Trade unionists ===
- John Edmonds, former General Secretary of GMB Union
- Mick Lynch, General Secretary of the National Union of Rail, Maritime and Transport Workers (RMT)
- Arthur Scargill, former trade union leader, leader of the Socialist Labour Party

=== Journalists and non-fiction writers ===
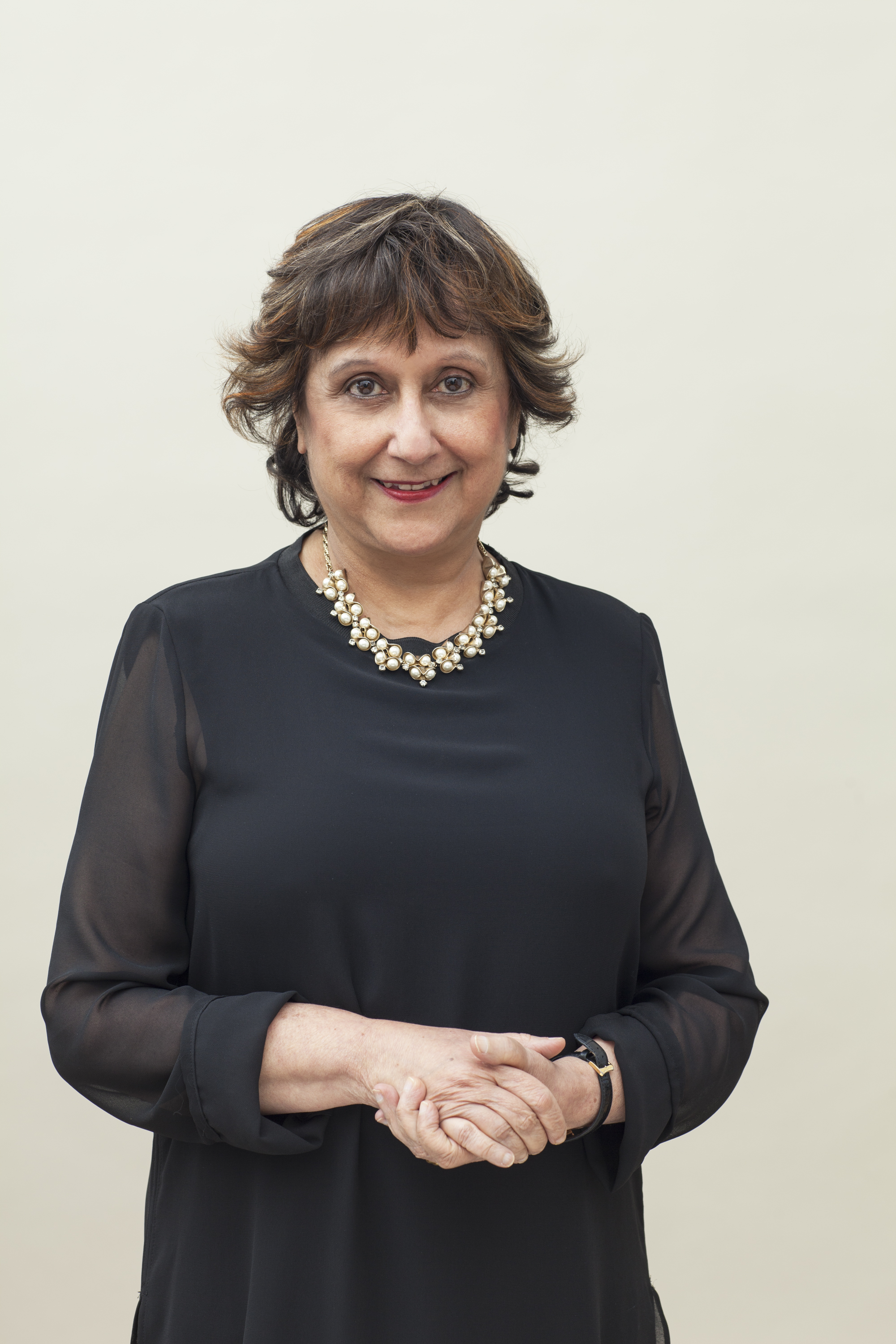
Yasmin Alibhai-Brown

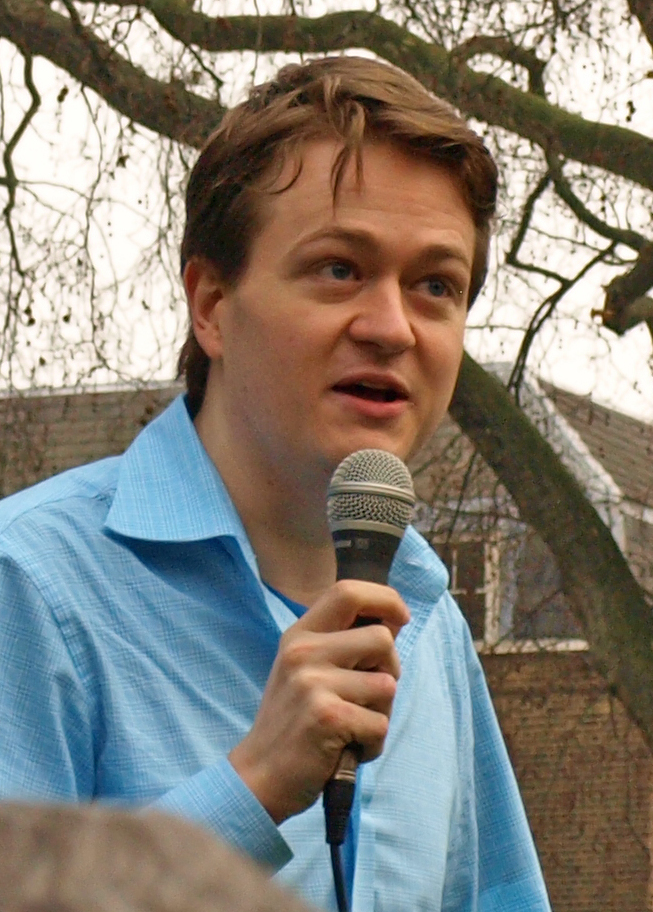
Johann Hari

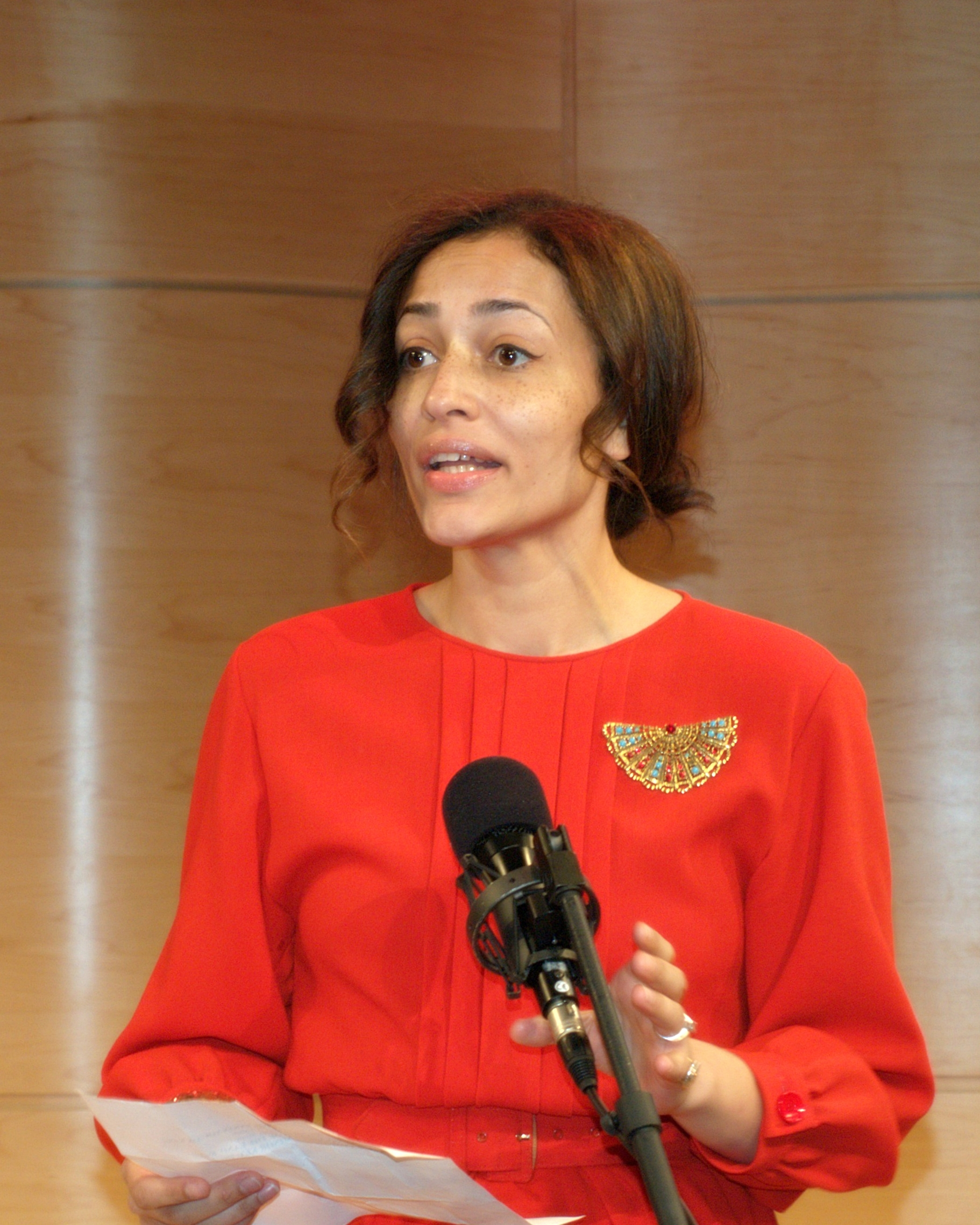
Zadie Smith

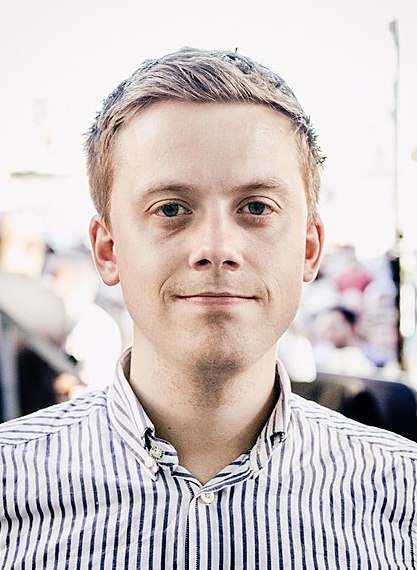
Owen Jones

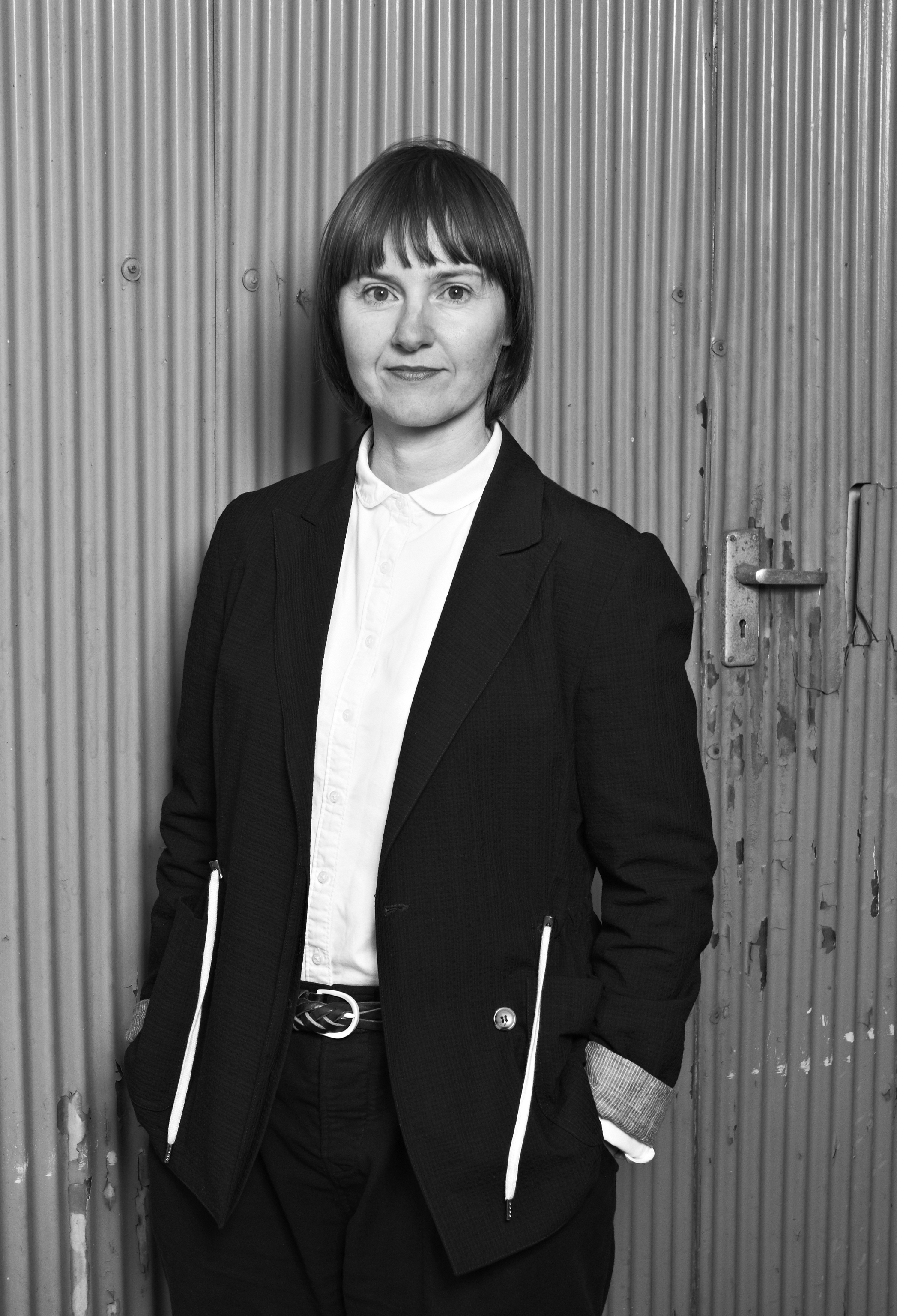
Vicky Richardson

- Yasmin Alibhai-Brown, columnist for The Independent
- Jackie Ashley, journalist
- Julian Baggini, philosopher and writer
- Piers Brendon, historian and writer
- Emma Brockes, author and journalist
- Heather Brooke, journalist, writer and FOI activist
- Julie Burchill, writer and columnist
- Beatrix Campbell, journalist and author
- Nick Cohen, columnist for The Observer
- Michael Collins, writer and broadcaster
- Robert Crampton, journalist (The Times)
- Bill Emmott, former editor of The Economist
- Otto English, author and journalist
- Jonathan Freedland, journalist
- Tanya Gold, journalist
- Roy Greenslade, journalist and academic
- Johann Hari, writer and journalist
- Lester Holloway, journalist and former councillor (Labour)
- Mick Hume, journalist
- Owen Jones, journalist
- Kitty Kelley, American journalist and author
- Simon Kelner, journalist and former editor of The Independent
- Matt Kennard, journalist and head of investigations at Declassified UK
- A. L. Kennedy, writer and academic
- Philippe Legrain, economist and writer
- Tim Lott, author
- Iain Macwhirter, political commentator
- Kevin Maguire, journalist
- Kenan Malik, writer, lecturer and broadcaster
- Andrew MacGregor Marshall, journalist
- Allegra McEvedy, chef and food writer
- Chris McLaughlin, journalist
- Suzanne Moore, journalist
- Tom Nairn, essayist
- Brendan O'Neill, journalist
- Susie Orbach, psychotherapist and writer
- Stephen Pollard, author and journalist
- Jay Rayner, food critic
- Brian Reade, Daily Mirror columnist
- Vicky Richardson, journalist
- Paul Routledge, Daily Mirror journalist
- Frances Ryan, journalist and political activist
- Ash Sarkar, journalist and political activist
- Miranda Sawyer, journalist
- Mark Seddon, journalist
- Will Self, journalist
- Joan Smith, novelist, journalist and human rights activist
- Polly Toynbee, columnist for The Guardian
- Janice Turner, journalist and columnist for The Times
- Francis Wheen, journalist, writer and broadcaster
- Peter Wilby, journalist
- Gary Younge, journalist

=== Novelists and fiction authors ===
- Philippa Gregory, novelist
- Mark Haddon, novelist
- James Kelman, novelist and playwright
- Kathy Lette, novelist
- John Niven, screenwriter and author
- Caryl Phillips, novelist
- Philip Pullman, author
- Michèle Roberts, novelist and poet
- Sara Sheridan, author and historical novelist
- Zadie Smith, author
- Jonathan Trigell, author

=== Broadcasters ===
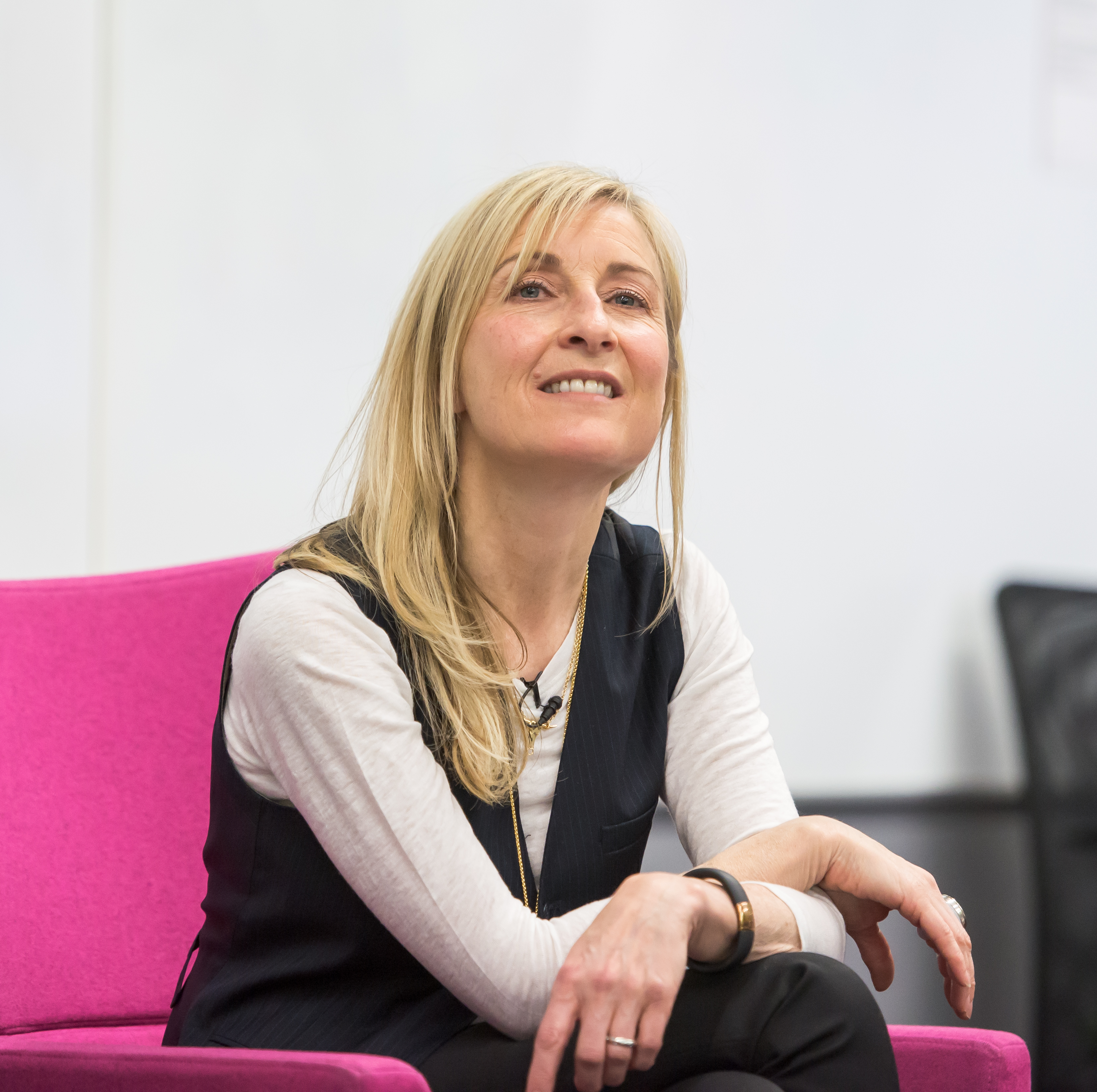
Fiona Phillips

- Simon Fanshawe, writer and broadcaster
- Mariella Frostrup, journalist and broadcaster
- Julia Hartley-Brewer, radio presenter and political journalist
- John Humphrys, radio and television presenter
- Mark Kermode, film critic, journalist
- Paul Mason, political commentator and author
- Fiona Phillips, journalist and broadcaster
- Amol Rajan, journalist and broadcaster
- Lesley Riddoch, radio broadcaster, activist and journalist
- Matthew Wright, broadcaster and journalist

=== Business people ===
- Dawn Airey, media executive and sports administrator
- Alan McGee, co-founder of Creation Records and Poptones
- Tim Waterstone, founder of Waterstones bookshops and author

=== Actors ===
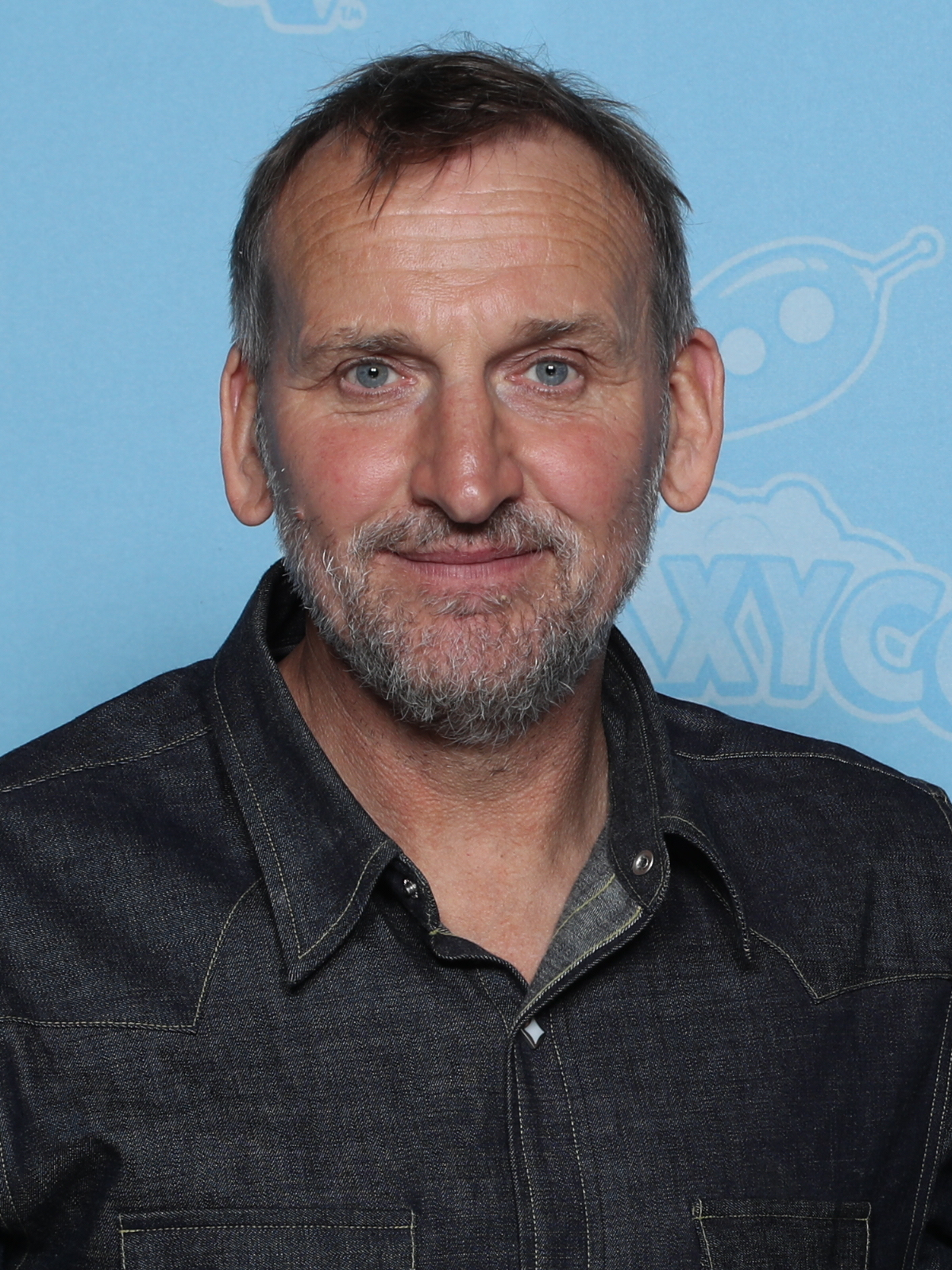
Christopher Eccleston

- Steve Coogan, actor and comedian
- Brian Cox
- Ben Dover, pornographic actor
- Christopher Eccleston
- Colin Firth, actor, played King George VI in The King's Speech (2010)
- Mark Gatiss, actor, comedian, screenwriter and novelist
- Margot Leicester, actor, appeared in King Charles III (2017) as Camilla, Duchess of Cornwall
- Paul McGann
- Tobias Menzies, actor, played Prince Philip in The Crown
- Josh O'Connor, played Prince Charles in The Crown
- Daniel Radcliffe
- Dougray Scott
- Elaine C. Smith
- Samuel West, actor and director, portrayed Prince Albert Victor in Edward the Seventh and The Ripper, and King George VI in Hyde Park on Hudson (2012)

=== Comedians ===
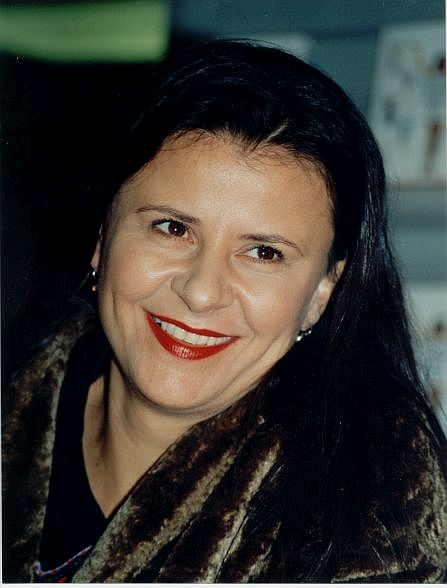
Tracey Ullman

- Frankie Boyle, comedian and writer
- Jo Brand
- Robin Ince, comedian, actor and writer
- Eddie Izzard, comedian, actor and writer
- Lloyd Langford
- Rob Newman
- John Oliver, actor and comedian, host of Last Week Tonight with John Oliver
- Mark Steel
- Mark Thomas, comedian, author and activist
- Tracey Ullman, actor and comedian
- Henning Wehn

=== Singers, musicians and composers ===
- Akala, rapper
- James Dean Bradfield, lead vocalist and guitarist of the Manic Street Preachers
- Ray Burns (Captain Sensible), musician
- Adrian Fry, trombonist and arranger
- Iona Fyfe, singer
- Mark 'Barney' Greenway, singer
- Paul Heaton, singer (The Beautiful South)
- Pat Kane, musician (Hue and Cry), journalist and political activist
- Kunt and the Gang, musician
- Sean Moore, musician (Manic Street Preachers)
- Morrissey, singer-songwriter and author (formerly of The Smiths)
- Craig Reid, musician (The Proclaimers)
- Charlie Reid, musician (The Proclaimers)
- Paul Simonon, musician (formerly of The Clash)
- Robert Smith, musician (The Cure)
- Paul Towndrow, saxophonist
- Nicky Wire, musician (Manic Street Preachers)

=== Artists ===
- Steve Bell, cartoonist
- Peter Fluck, caricaturist and satirist
- Mark McGowan, performance artist known as Chunky Mark and The Artist Taxi Driver
- Ralph Steadman, cartoonist

=== Theatre and film directors ===
- John Boorman, film director
- Danny Boyle, Academy Award-winning film director
- Richard Eyre, theatre and film director
- Stephen Frears, film director and producer
- Paul Greengrass, film director and screenwriter
- Duncan Jones, film director, producer and screenwriter
- Mike Leigh, writer and director of film and theatre
- Ken Loach, film and television director

=== Screenwriters and playwrights ===
- Alan Bissett, author and playwright
- Jon Canter, television comedy writer
- Maureen Chadwick, screenwriter, dramatist and television producer
- Michael Frayn, author and playwright
- David Hare, playwright
- Julia Pascal, playwright and theatre director

=== Poets ===
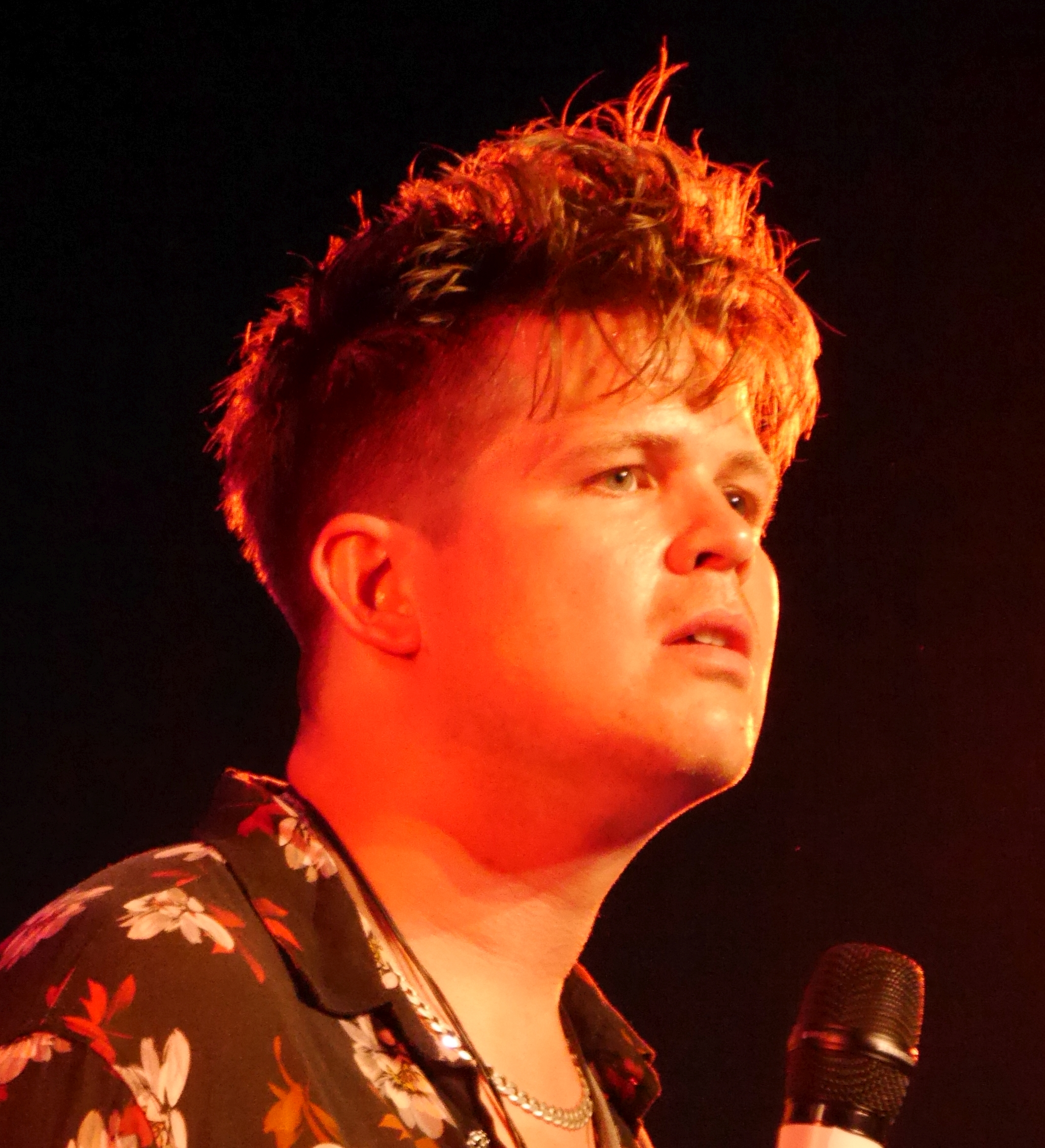
Luke Wright

- Tony Harrison, poet, translator and playwright
- Mike Jenkins
- Patrick Jones, poet, playwright and filmmaker
- Liz Lochhead, Makar (National Poet for Scotland) and essayist
- Sean O'Brien, poet and critic
- Michael Rosen, novelist and poet
- Luke Wright

=== Sportspeople ===
- Joey Barton, football manager and former footballer
- Stan Collymore, former footballer
- Frankie Dettori, Italian jockey
- Brian Moore, former rugby union player

=== Legal professionals ===
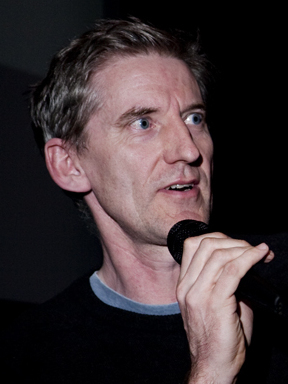
Clive Stafford Smith

- Louise Christian, human rights lawyer
- Imran Khan, lawyer
- Michael Mansfield, KC
- Geoffrey Robertson, KC
- Clive Stafford Smith, lawyer and human rights campaigner

=== Academics ===
- Kehinde Andrews, author and professor of Black Studies at Birmingham City University
- Sophie Grace Chappell, philosopher
- Richard Dawkins, evolutionary biologist and writer
- Gregor Gall, writer and academic
- Ted Honderich, academic and philosopher
- Laura McAllister, Professor of Public Policy and the Governance of Wales at the Wales Governance Centre, Cardiff University
- Steven Rose, scientist and writer
- Quentin Skinner, academic and historian
- Adam Tomkins, academic and former MSP (Scottish Conservatives)
- Nigel Warburton, academic and philosopher

=== Religious figures ===
- Pete Broadbent, former Bishop of Willesden

=== YouTubers ===
- Alex O'Connor, YouTuber and podcaster
- Shaun, YouTuber
- Abigail Thorn, YouTuber, actress and playwright

== Individuals (deceased) ==
=== Politicians ===
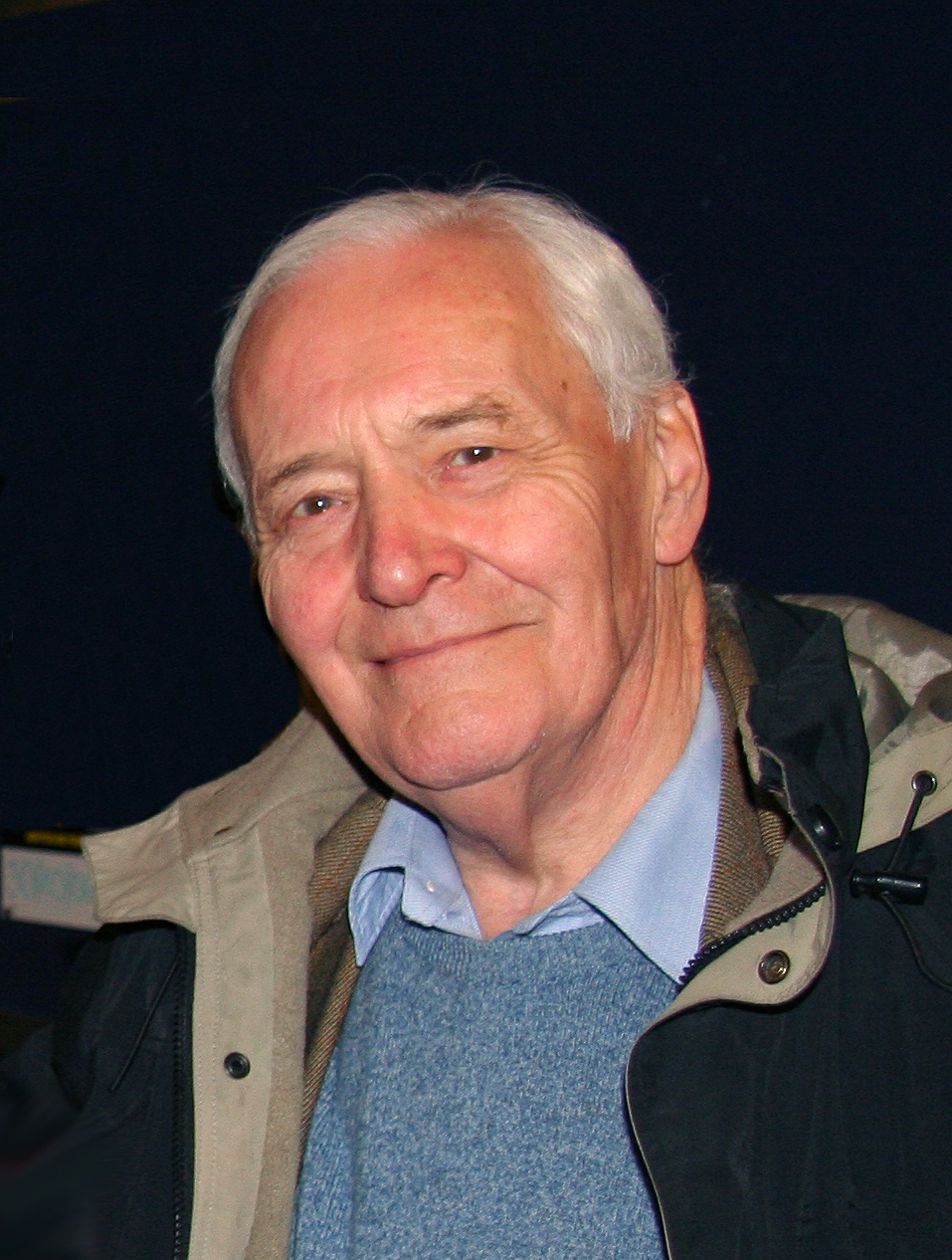
Tony Benn

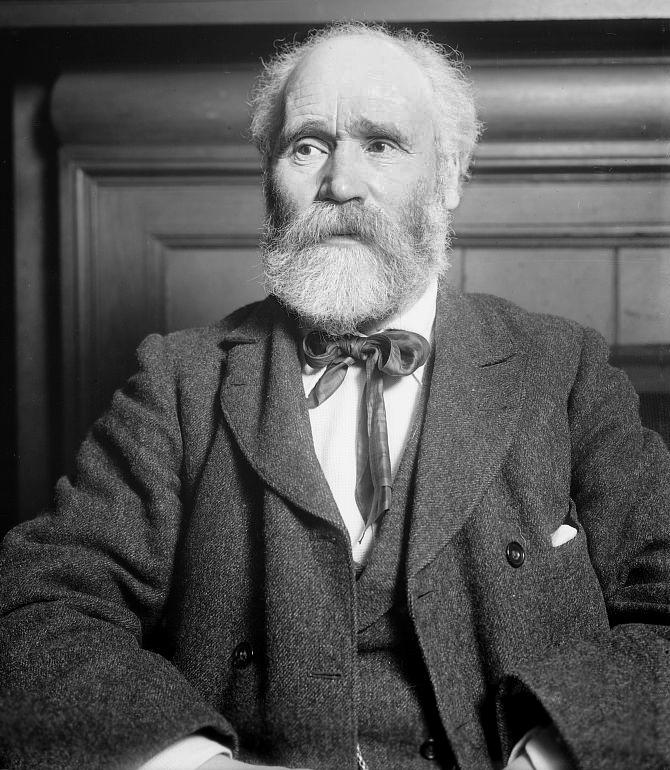
Keir Hardie

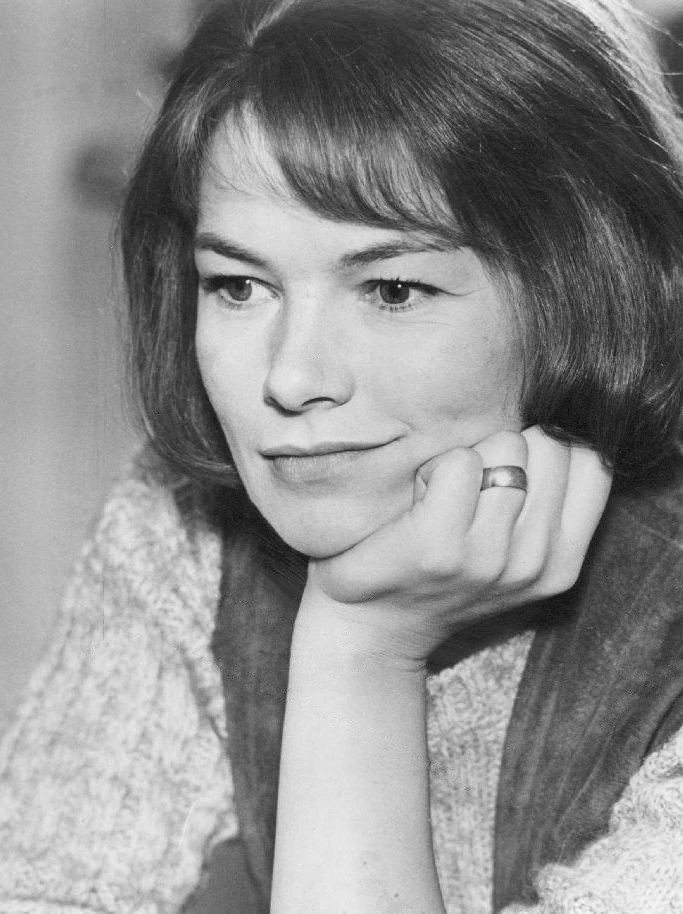
Glenda Jackson

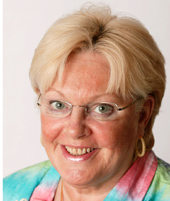
Margo MacDonald

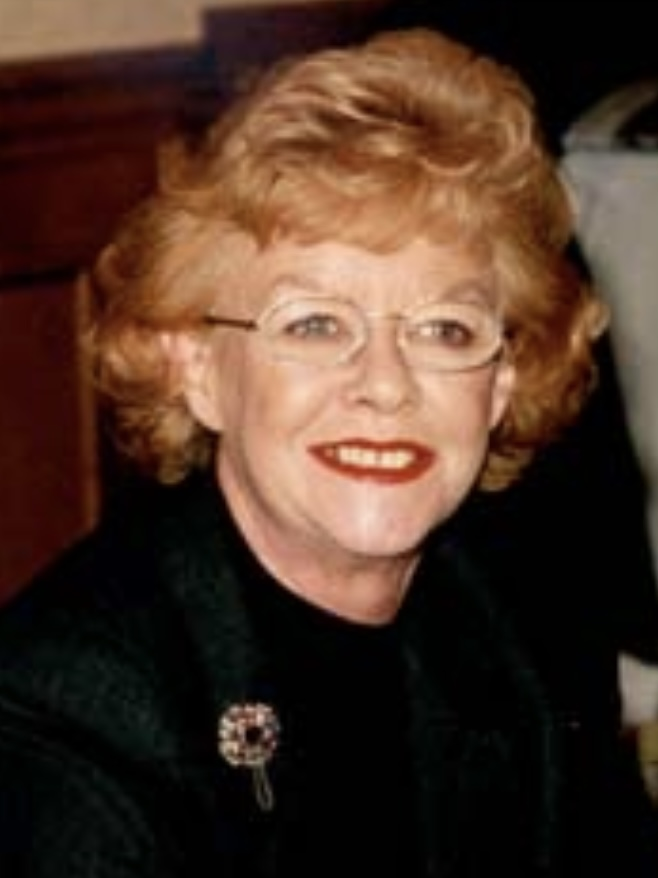
Kay Ullrich

- Tony Banks (1942–2006), MP and peer (Labour)
- Tony Benn (1925–2014), MP (Labour)
- Charles Bradlaugh (1833–1891), MP (Liberal)
- George Buchanan (1890–1955), MP (Labour)
- William Cluse (1875–1955), MP (Labour)
- Richard Crossman (1907–1974), MP (Labour) and editor of the New Statesman
- Donald Dewar (1937–2000), Scottish Labour politician and First Minister of Scotland
- Sir Charles Dilke (1843–1911), MP (Liberal)
- Jack Dormand (1919–2003), MP and peer (Labour)
- Raymond Fletcher (1921–1991), MP (Labour)
- Paul Flynn (1935–2019), MP (Labour)
- Michael Foot (1913–2010), MP (Labour) and leader of the Labour Party
- Willie Gallacher (1881–1965), MP (Communist Party of Great Britain)
- Arthur Greenwood (1880–1954), MP (Labour)
- Willie Hamilton (1917–2000), MP (Labour)
- George Hardie (1873–1937), MP (Labour)
- Keir Hardie (1856–1915), MP and founder of the Labour Party
- Roy Hattersley (1932–2026), MP (Labour) and peer
- Emrys Hughes (1894–1969), MP (Labour) and journalist
- Glenda Jackson (1936–2023), MP (Labour) and actress
- William Keenan (1889–1955), MP (Labour)
- George Lansbury (1859–1940), MP (Labour) and leader of the Labour Party
- Margo MacDonald (1943–2014), MP and MSP (SNP)
- David Marquand (1934–2024), academic, author and former MP (Labour)
- James Maxton (1885–1946), MP (Independent Labour Party)
- Valentine McEntee (1871–1953), MP (Labour)
- John McGovern (1887–1968), MP (Labour)
- Kevin McNamara (1934–2017), MP (Labour)
- Michael Meacher (1939–2015), MP (Labour)
- John Stuart Mill (1806–1873), MP (Liberal), philosopher and political economist
- Peter Mond, 4th Baron Melchett (1948–2018), life peer (Labour) and campaigner
- Mo Mowlam (1949–2005), MP (Labour) and Secretary of State for Northern Ireland
- Stan Orme (1923–2005), MP (Labour)
- John Prescott (1938–2024), MP, peer (Labour) and Deputy Prime Minister of the United Kingdom
- Gwilym Prys-Davies (1923–2017), peer (Labour)
- Richard Rogers (1933–2021), peer (Labour) and architect
- Alfred Salter (1873–1945), MP (Labour)
- Alex Salmond (1954–2024), MP, MSP and First Minister of Scotland (SNP, Alba)
- Nancy Seear (1913–1997), peer and social scientist (Liberal, then Liberal Democrats)
- Algernon Sidney (1623–1683), English politician and political theorist
- Campbell Stephen (1884–1947), MP (Independent Labour Party)
- Dick Taverne (1928–2025), MP (Labour, Democratic Labour) and peer (Liberal Democrats)
- Ernest Thurtle (1884–1954), MP (Labour)
- Kay Ullrich (1943–2021), MSP (SNP)
- Benjamin Vaughan (1751–1835), political economist and MP

=== Political activists, advisers and social reformers ===
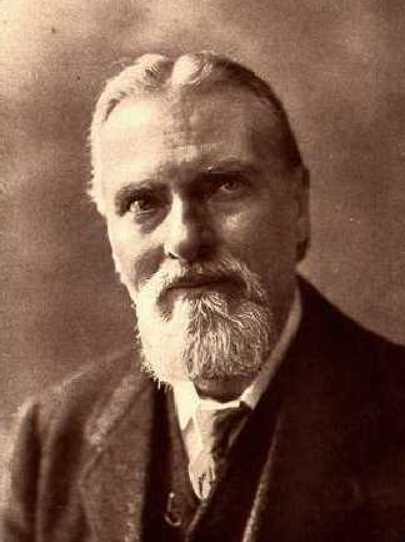
George William Foote

- Jeremy Bentham (1748–1832), philosopher, jurist and social reformer
- Julian Cayo-Evans (1937–1995), Welsh political activist and leader of the Free Wales Army
- Dennis Coslett (1939–2004), Welsh political activist (Free Wales Army) and author
- Marcia Falkender (1932–2019), peer and private secretary to prime minister Harold Wilson
- George William Foote (1850–1915), secularist and journal editor; secretary of the London Republican Club (1870) and National Republican League (1871)
- John Frost (1750–1842), English radical
- Stephen Maxwell (1942–2012), SNP activist
- Gareth Miles (1938-2023), Welsh language activist
- Trefor Morgan (1914–1970), Welsh nationalist activist
- Thomas Muir of Huntershill (1765–1799), Scottish political reformer
- Mary Wollstonecraft (1759–1797), feminist writer and philosopher

=== Journalists, authors and writers ===
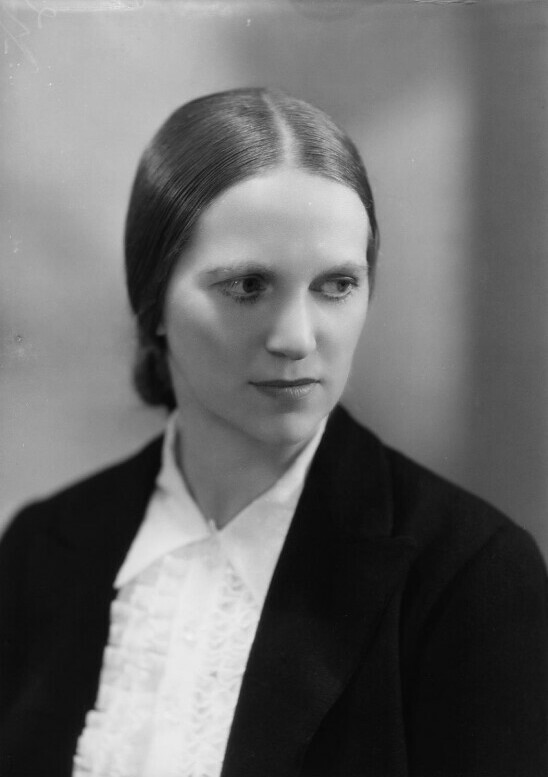
Ethel Mannin

- J. G. Ballard (1930–2009), novelist
- William Blake (1757–1827), writer and artist
- Robert Burns (1759–1796), poet and lyricist
- Carmen Callil (1938–2022), writer and publisher
- John Cole (1927–2013), BBC political editor
- Thomas Davison (1794–1826), journalist and publisher
- A. A. Gill (1954–2016), journalist and critic
- Thomas Gordon (c. 1691–1750), Scottish writer and Commonwealthman
- Alasdair Gray (1934–2019), Scottish author
- Barbara Hall (1923–2022), crossword compiler and writer
- James Harrington (1611–1677), political theorist and author
- Christopher Hitchens (1949–2011), author and columnist
- Leonard Hobhouse (1864–1929), political theorist
- Anthony Holden (1947–2023), writer, broadcaster and critic
- Mervyn Jones (1922–2010), writer
- Ethel Mannin (1900–1984), novelist and travel writer
- Kingsley Martin (1897–1969), editor of the New Statesman, 1930–60
- John Milton (1608–1674), poet
- Edwin Morgan (1920–2010), Makar (National Poet for Scotland) and translator
- Jan Morris (1926–2020), historian and writer
- William Morris (1834–1896), writer and artist
- Deborah Orr (1962–2019), journalist
- Thomas Paine (1737–1809), English-American author and revolutionary
- Ronald Payne (1926–2013), journalist and war correspondent
- Edward Pearce (1939–2018), New Statesman contributor
- Claire Rayner (1931–2010), journalist
- George W. M. Reynolds (1814–1879), author and journalist
- Percy Bysshe Shelley (1792–1822), English Romantic poet
- Sue Townsend (1946–2014), author (wrote the best-selling political satire The Queen and I, in which Britain becomes a republic, later adapted as a TV drama on Sky One, and its sequel, Queen Camilla)
- H. G. Wells (1866–1946), writer
- Peter Whelan (1931–2014), playwright
- Andreas Whittam Smith (1937–2025), journalist (co-founder and first editor of The Independent)
- Gwyn A. Williams (1925–1995), historian
- Benjamin Zephaniah (1958–2023), poet

=== Singers, musicians and composers ===
- Shane MacGowan (1957–2023), singer and songwriter (The Pogues)
- Robert Simpson (1921–1997), composer

=== Actors ===
- Honor Blackman (1925–2020)
- Andrew Ray (1939–2003), actor who played the Duke of York (George VI) in Edward and Mrs Simpson and the Duke of Windsor (Edward VIII) in Passion and Paradise

=== Artists ===
- Terence Conran (1931–2020), designer and restaurateur
- William James Linton (1812–1897), wood-engraver and author

=== Legal professionals ===
- Anthony Scrivener (1935–2015), QC
- Nathaniel Wade (c. 1666?–1718), English lawyer

=== Academics ===
- Patrick Collinson (1929–2011), historian
- Bernard Crick (1929–2008), academic and political philosopher
- Stephen Haseler (1942–2017), professor, author

=== Military personnel ===
- Robert Overton (c. 1609–1678), English soldier and scholar
- John Lawson (ca. 1615–1665), naval officer

=== Religious figures ===
- Joseph Fawcett (c. 1758–1804), English Presbyterian minister and poet
- Donald Soper (1903–1998), Methodist minister and peer (Labour)

=== Media figures ===
- Max Clifford (1943–2017), publicist
- Tony Garnett (1936–2020), television producer

=== Other public figures ===
- Nicholas Culpeper (1616–1654), botanist, herbalist, physician and astrologer

== Groups ==
Logo of the British pressure group Republic

- Green Party of England and Wales
- Labour for a Republic
- Our Republic
- Plaid Cymru
- Republic
- Scottish Greens
- Scottish Republican Socialist Movement
- Scottish Socialist Party
