= Scottish republicanism =

Movement to make Scotland a republic

Flag of Scotland

Scottish republicanism (Scottish Gaelic: Poblachdas na h-Alba) or republicanism in Scotland is an ideology based on the belief that Scotland should be a republic; the nation is currently a monarchy as part of the United Kingdom. Republicanism is associated with Scottish nationalism and the Scottish independence movement, but also with British republicanism and the movement for federalism in the United Kingdom.

== History ==
Andrew Fletcher of Saltoun is one of the most prominent pre-Union advocates of a Scottish republic, based on agrarian and patriarchal principles. He was a major inspiration to Scottish Enlightenment philosopher Adam Ferguson, whose republican ideals were penned down in An Essay on the History of Civil Society (1767).

One of the foremost documentations of modern Scottish republicanism is the Declaration of Calton Hill, proclaimed on 9 October 2004, the same day that Queen Elizabeth II opened the new Scottish Parliament Building at Holyrood.

In the run-up to the 2014 independence referendum, the Radical Independence Campaign advocated an independent Scottish republic with an elected head of state, instead of the continued union of crowns established with the English monarchy, predating the Acts of Union.

Ahead of the Accession declaration of Charles III at Mercat Cross in Edinburgh on 11 September 2022, the campaign group Our Republic stated: "We encourage those with objections to these proclamations to make those clear". The members voiced their opposition to the new King through booing, turning their backs and shouting "no consent", and holding up anti-Monarchy slogans during the Lord Lyon King of Arms's declaration. They were briefly detained by Police Scotland before being released. One protester was later again arrested and charged under "Breach of the Peace".

== Republicanism within the independence movement ==
Many people who advocate Scotland becoming a republic do so through their support for Scottish independence. This would entail Scotland becoming independent from the United Kingdom and instead of continuing the Union of the Crowns that predate the political union, a republic would be formed, with an elected Head of State assuming the role of the deposed monarch.

Scotland's largest pro-independence party, the Scottish National Party (SNP), favours retaining the monarchy as a Commonwealth realm similar to the situation in other crown countries like Canada, Australia and New Zealand. However, the party has a number of prominent republican members, including Roseanna Cunningham, Tommy Sheppard and Humza Yousaf, who served as First Minister from 2023 to 2024.

The republican Scottish Green Party have held two ministerial positions in the Scottish Government since 2021, under the Bute House Agreement. Green co-leader and Minister for Zero Carbon Buildings, Active Travel and Tenants' Rights Patrick Harvie has been highly critical of the British monarchy, calling for the monarch to be replaced with a "democratically accountable head of state", as well as describing the Royal Family an "outdated, discredited and totally undemocratic institution". Harvie boycotted a service of thanksgiving for the Coronation of Charles III and Camilla in St Giles' Cathedral along with fellow Green co-leader and Minister for Green Skills, Circular Economy and Biodiversity Lorna Slater. Slater had previously spoken at a republican rally in May 2023 on Calton Hill with Maggie Chapman.

The SNP proposes that in the event of independence, the presiding officer's post be replaced with that of chancellor of Scotland. In addition to presiding over the Scottish Parliament, the chancellor would possess additional constitutional powers during the absence of the monarch from Scotland; chiefly, the chancellor should act in a role similar to a governor-general in the other Commonwealth realms.

Most of the other political parties and organisations which advocate Scottish independence also advocate Scotland becoming an independent republic. These include:

- Scottish Greens
- Scottish Socialist Party
- Alba Party (dissolved in March 2026)
- Scottish Republican Socialist Movement
- Radical Independence Campaign
- Our Republic (cross-constitutional campaign group)

== British republicanism ==
Another concept for Scotland becoming a republic is through reform of the United Kingdom's constitutional status from a constitutional monarchy to a republican constitution. There is not an explicit link with British unionism, as this tends to advocate the Union of Crowns. This is a form of British republicanism, which is the majority position among English republicans; politicians like Dennis Skinner and Jeremy Corbyn and the advocacy group Republic have all expressed preference for this. There is no mainstream support for this concept in any Scottish political parties, and it remains a personal position, unlike support for an independent Scottish republic which does have party support.

Adam Tomkins was a republican who supported a reformed Britain without monarchy, but his opinion shifted after being elected for the firmly monarchist Scottish Conservative & Unionist Party. Additionally, Scottish Labour MSPs Katy Clark and Mercedes Villalba advocate for abolishing the Monarchy across the UK as well as radical constitutional reform. The Scottish campaign group Our Republic also contains several members who support Scotland remaining in a reformed Union.

== Opinion polling ==
=== Polling on the British monarchy with Scotland as part of the UK ===
Table of public opinion in Scotland on the "British Monarchy" as part of UK.							
Date conducted	Pollster	Sample size	Support monarchy	Support elected head of state	Undecided/ Ambivalent	Lead	Notes
May 2024	Survation	-	34%	45%	21%	11%	First poll to prefer elected head of state.
King Charles III has a coronation on 6 May 2023
17–20 April 2023	YouGov	1,032	46%	40%	14%	6%	(Reference to future) Question: Do you think Britain should continue to have a monarchy in the future, or should it be replaced with an elected head of state?
3–15 March 2023	Lord Ashcroft	1,470	46%	32%	22%	14%	Question: "If there were a referendum tomorrow, how would you vote?"
7–11 October 2022	Panelbase	1,018	50%	37%	14%	13%	Question: "Should the monarchy be retained or should we be a republic with an elected head of state?"
30 September – 4 October 2022	YouGov	1,067	50%	34%	17%	16%	(Reference to future) Question: "Do you think Britain should continue to have a monarchy in the future, or should it be replaced with an elected head of state?"
Queen Elizabeth II dies on 8 September 2022 and King Charles III ascends to the throne
11–15 March 2021	Opinium	1,096	45%	36%	19%	9%	(Reference to future) Question: "Do you think Britain should continue to have a monarchy in the future, or become a republic?"
2018	DeltaPoll	511	41%	28%	31%	13%	Question: "Are you in favour or against the institution of the Monarchy?"
9 January 2015 – 14 January 2015	Panelbase	1,007	65%	25%	10%	40%	Question: "Should Britain keep the monarchy?"
17 October 2013 – 24 October 2013	Panelbase	866	48%	32%	20%	16%	Question: "What are your views on the monarchy?"
24 April 2007 – 26 April 2007	YouGov	1,012	62%	46%	12%	16%	Question: "If Scotland remains within the UK, should the Queen remain Scotland’s head of state?"

=== Polling on the British monarchy if Scotland becomes independent ===
Table of public opinion in Scotland on the "British Monarchy" If Scotland becomes independent.							
Date conducted	Pollster	Sample size	Support monarchy	Support elected head of state	Undecided/ Ambivalent/would not vote	Lead	Notes
4–6 December 2024	Norstat	1,013	36%	51%	12%	15%	(Vote on Scotland becoming both independent and a republic) "If Scottish independence meant that Scotland would be a republic - meaning the King would no longer be the head of state, so Scotland’s governance would be fully democratic and not a monarchy - how would you vote if there were an independence referendum tomorrow?"
King Charles III has a coronation on 6 May 2023
3–15 March 2023	Lord Ashcroft	1,470	38%	44%	18%	6%	"If Scotland voted to become independent, would you want the King to remain as Scotland's head of state, or not?"
12–16 December 2022	Panelbase	1,004	35%	43%	21%	8%	Question: “If Scotland votes to become an independent country should Scotland be a republic with an elected head of state or should Scotland keep King Charles as head of state?”
30 September – 4 October 2022	YouGov	1,067	41%	40%	19%	1%	Question: "And, if Scotland became an independent country, do you think it should continue to have a monarchy in the future, or should it be replaced with an elected head of state?"
29 September – 5 October 2022	Ipsos	1,000	42%	29%	23%	13%	Question: "If Scotland were to become an independent country in the future, would you support or oppose Scotland keeping the reigning UK monarch as its head of state?"
Queen Elizabeth II dies on 8 September 2022 and King Charles III ascends to the throne
16–24 June 2021	Panelbase	1,287	47%	35%	18%	12%	Question: "If Scotland becomes independent would you prefer the monarch to remain head of state in Scotland or would you rather Scotland had an elected head of state?"
11–16 March 2021	Opinium	1,096	39%	39%	22%	even	Question: "If Scotland became an independent country do you think Scotland should continue as a monarchy or become a republic?"
24–26 April 2007	YouGov	1,012	38%	47%	15%	9%	Question: "Should the Queen remain Head of State in an independent Scotland?"
18–20 April 2007	YouGov	1,027	40%	41%	19%	1%	Question: "What is your preference as to an independent Scotland’s head of state?"

==== More than two main options ====
Date conducted	Pollster	Sample size	Support monarchy	Support elected head of state or other	Undecided/ Ambivalent	Lead	Notes
9–11 January 2012	YouGov	1,002	46% (4% for a replacement Scottish monarch)	41%	8%	5% (excluding a Scottish monarch)	Question: "If Scotland were to become independent, what would be your prefered [sic] head of state?"
8–10 July 2008	YouGov	1,131	55%	Someone else: 10%, no head of state: 29%	6%	16%	Question: "What is your preference as to an independent Scotland’s head of state?" (3 options for answer + don't know)

== See also ==
=== Scotland ===
- Politics of Scotland
- Yes Scotland
- Our Republic (Scotland)

=== Other ===
- Welsh republicanism
- Republic (political organisation)
- Republicanism in the United Kingdom
- Labour for a Republic
- List of advocates of republicanism in the United Kingdom
- Republicanism in Australia
- Republicanism in New Zealand
- Republicanism in Barbados
- Republicanism in the Bahamas
- Republicanism in Canada
- Republicanism in Jamaica
