= Scottish Republican Socialist Movement =

Political organisation in Scotland

- Leader: Donald Anderson
- Founded: 1982
- Dissolved: 1998 (as a political party)
- Split from: Scottish National Party
- Merged into: Scottish Socialist Party
- Headquarters: Glasgow
- Ideology: Scottish republicanism Socialism
- Colours: Yellow, Red, Blue (Pantone 300 – official colour of the Saltire)

Party flag

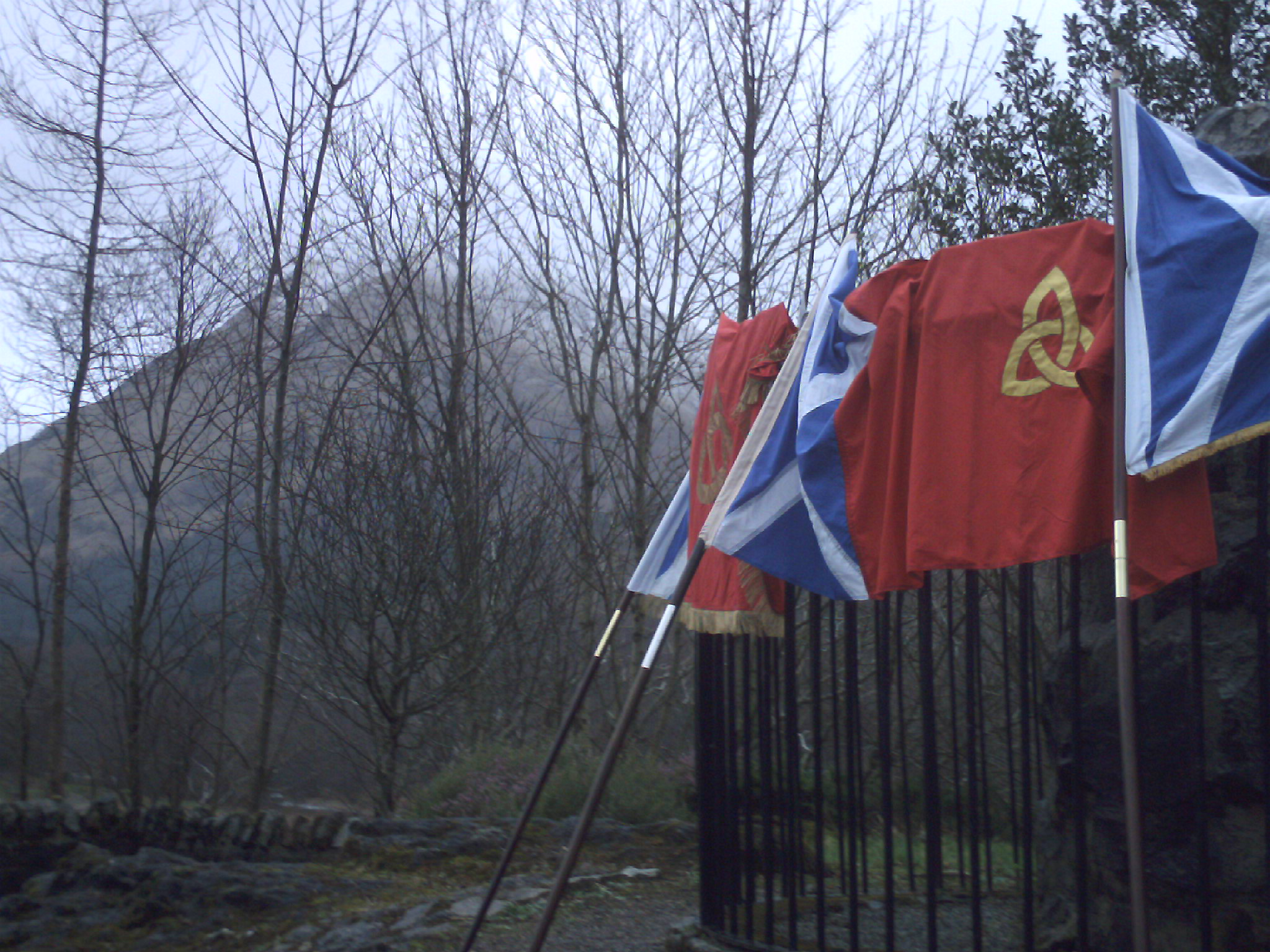
Glencoe commemoration

The Scottish Republican Socialist Movement (SRSM) is a political organisation that was formed out of the now defunct Scottish Republican Socialist Party (SRSP), a political party that operated in Scotland.

The SRSM campaigns for Scottish independence at a grassroots level and through cross-party organisations like Independence First, and organises regular events, including the annual 1320 Declaration of Arbroath rally, the Glencoe rally, and the John MacLean commemoration. It publishes two magazines, called Scottish Worker's Republic and Red Duster.

== History ==
=== Formation ===
The Scottish Republican Socialist Clubs were formed in 1973 to introduce socialism to the Scottish National Party (SNP) and grow support for Scottish independence among the left. After the expulsion of the 79 Group from the SNP, the Republican Clubs decided to form a coherent political party and the Scottish Republican Socialist Party was created in 1982.

While agreeing with the SNP insofar that they believed in independence, the SRSP believed this should be combined with support for revolutionary socialism. They argued that independence is meaningless to the working class unless it is socialist, and adopted an abstentionist position towards UK general elections.

=== Affiliation to the Scottish Socialist Party (1998–2006) ===
In 1998, the Scottish Socialist Party (SSP) was formed and the SRSP narrowly decided to join them, reforming as a cross-party movement called the Scottish Republican Socialist Movement. Many members ended up within the SSP, but not exclusively.

In December 2004, the SRSM was designated as a banned organisation by the SNP because of its affiliation with the Scottish Socialist Party. As a result, SNP members were no longer allowed to be members of the SRSM.

The SRSM was active in campaigning against attempts within the SSP to ditch the policy of supporting independence. It succeeded at persuading high-profile SSP members like Alan McCombes, Rosie Kane, and Kevin Williamson to speak at its rallies and for its cause. The SRSM twice attempted to entrench a commitment to Scottish independence in the SSP's constitution.

In 2005, there were calls for the SRSM to be ejected from the SSP due to its vocal support for the Irish Republican Socialist Party and other Irish political groups that have been characterised as "opposed to the Northern Ireland peace process". In the Sunday Herald, journalist Paul Hutcheon characterised the movement as having "web-links to Irish terror groups". John Patrick, a member of the SRSM and the SSP's animal rights spokesperson, insisted that the SRSM had no political links to organisations in Ireland but had a relationship "based on solidarity in trying to break up the British state".

=== Disaffiliation and later activity (2006–present) ===
In October 2006, the SRSM announced that it was disaffiliating from the Scottish Socialist Party, citing unhappiness with unionist elements within the party and the failure of their third attempt to entrench a commitment to independence in the party constitution. The SRSM confirmed it would continue to operate as a cross-party organisation, and a "minority" of SRSM members remained part of the SSP.

In September 2012, the SRSM were banned from participating in the 2012 March and Rally for Scottish Independence in Edinburgh, because reports circulated by the Better Together campaign characterised the SRSM as "a group who regularly burn Union flags, attack the Queen, glorify terrorism and advocate a violent Scottish revolution". The SRSM's organiser, Donald Anderson, responded by stating the organisation "do not have any intention of burning flags at the Edinburgh rally", and that: "We will be there as individuals carrying Saltires, despite Unionist objections to our national flag. The Imperialist Union flag is not called the 'butcher's apron' for nothing."

The organisation reaffirmed and also updated its key values/demands at its Ard Fheis on Saturday 29 November 2014. The SRSM stands for:

- Independent Scottish Socialist Republic
- A Scotland that is nuclear free and out of NATO
- A democratic society based on a sustainable economy and workers' control.

The organisation is cross party and non-party and endeavours to work with all other organisations that share its goal of an independent Scotland.

The organisation organises a number of annual events including a republican Burns Night and commemorations at Glencoe, Arbroath and Bannockburn. Its main annual event however is the John Maclean March and Rally each November.

The Honorary President and Treasurer is Donald Anderson.

== See also ==
- Criticism of capitalism
- List of advocates of republicanism in the United Kingdom
- Scottish Campaign for Nuclear Disarmament
