= Our Republic =

- Formation: 2021
- Founded at: Edinburgh, Scotland
- Type: Advocacy group
- Purpose: Scottish republicanism
- Headquarters: Edinburgh
- Convenor: Tristan Gray
- Website: ourrepublic.scot

Our Republic is a political campaign for a Scottish republic calling for the abolition of the monarchy. It was founded in 2021.

== History ==
The organisation was formed in 2021 by activists from a mix of Scottish political parties from members with roots in Scotland, England, Ireland, Canada, the United States, and Lithuania. The following year it was revealed by polling that Scottish support for the monarchy stood at 45%.

== Activities ==
Our Republic is a political campaign for a Scottish republic calling for the abolition of the monarchy.

=== Reign of Elizabeth II ===
The organisation launched a petition to call for the political oaths sworn by Members of the Scottish Parliament (MSPs) to be made to the Scottish people rather than the monarchy, after several MSPs said that they were taking the oath under protest. The petition was backed by MSP Emma Roddick and Scottish Greens leader Patrick Harvie.

Our Republic expressed solidarity with calls in Jamaica for the United Kingdom to apologise for the monarchy's historic role in the slave trade, and for Jamaica's plans to abolish the monarchy and become a republic.

The organisation planned an anti-monarchy rally to coincide with Elizabeth II's Platinum Jubilee on 4 June 2022 on Calton Hill, Edinburgh, with MP Tommy Sheppard speaking.

=== Reign of Charles III ===
Ahead of the Accession declaration of Charles III at Mercat cross in Edinburgh on 11 September 2022, the organisation stated: "We encourage those with objections to these proclamations to make those clear". The members voiced their opposition to the new King through booing, turning their backs and shouting "no consent", and holding up anti-monarchy slogans during the Lord Lyon King of Arms's declaration. The protest made global headlines. They were briefly detained by Police Scotland before being released. One protester was later again arrested and charged under "Breach of the Peace". Our Republic raised concerns of freedom of expression in response to the charges.

In February 2023, Charles offered to allow people who "cannot afford to heat their homes" to use two of his Scottish properties—Dumfries House in Ayrshire and the Castle of Mey in Caithness—to keep warm for one day a week. Our Republic convener Tristan Gray responded by saying: "A cynical person may see this as little more than a token PR stunt instead of any sort of genuine attempt to help people who are suffering at this time, especially coming on the heels of both he and his son visiting a food bank without bringing food, despite being more than able to and especially when he has demanded a flamboyantly golden coronation he may wish to try and deflect criticism from."

Our Republic protested against Charles III's coronation on 6 May 2023, with a rally on Calton Hill in Edinburgh. Speakers at the rally included politicians Tommy Sheppard, Maggie Chapman and Lorna Slater as well as several activists from social and political groups such as the Scottish Socialist Party.

During the service of thanksgiving organised in Edinburgh for Charles III on 5 July 2023, Our Republic organised a rally outside the Scottish Parliament, attended by Scottish Green Party co-leader Patrick Harvie.

== See also ==
- Republic
- Republicanism in the United Kingdom
- Scottish republicanism
