= Vicky Richardson =

British writer, curator and consultant

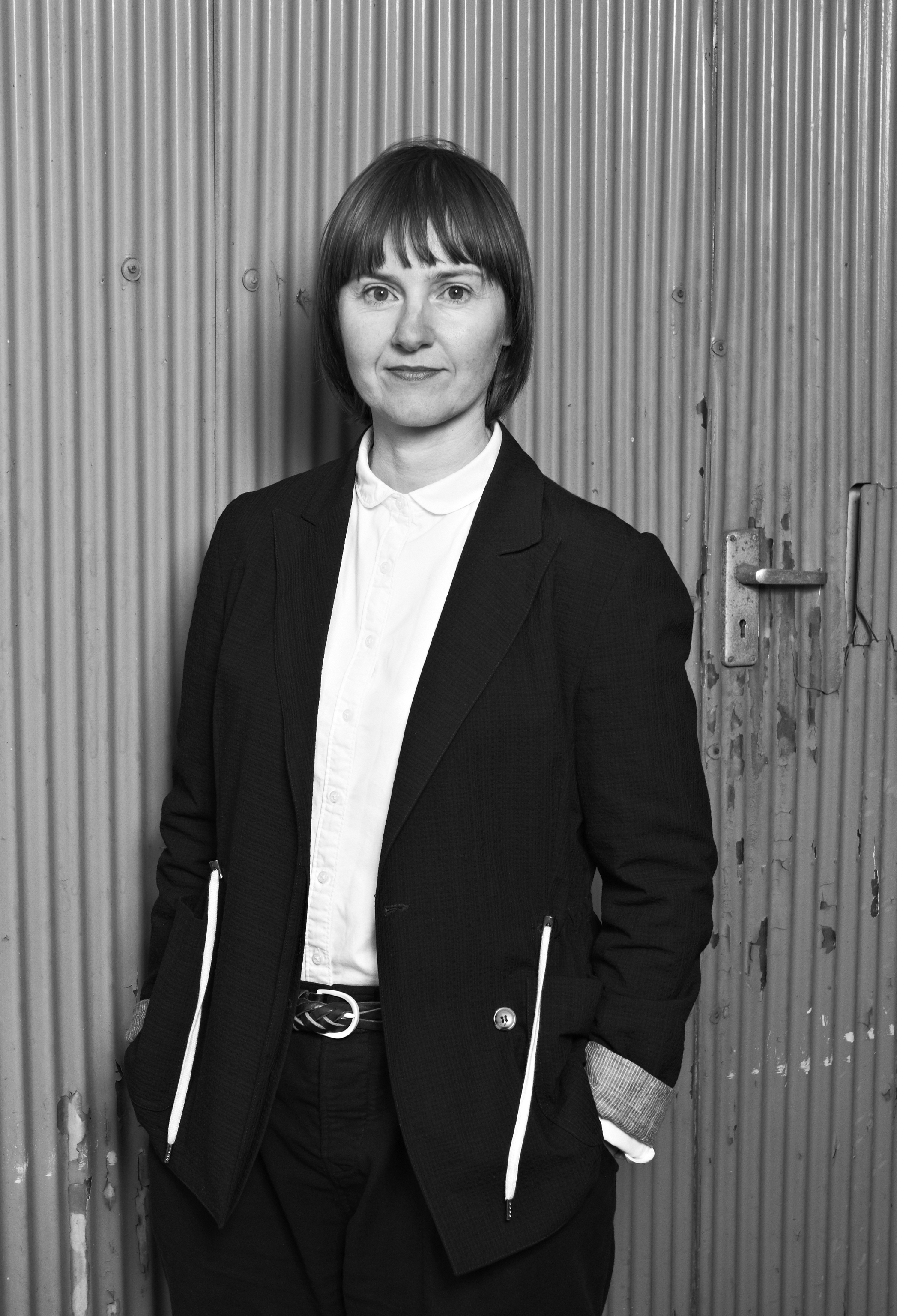
Vicky Richardson

Vicky Richardson (born 1968) is a British curator, writer, educator and consultant specialising in architecture and design. She is founder and director of the curatorial office, Pick Up Architecture,. In 2014 she was nominated as one of Debrett's 500, as one of 20 most influential people in British architecture; and in 2015 she was named a 'Woman of the Year' by the Women of the Year Awards, and received an Honorary Fellowship from the Royal Institute of British Architects.

She has held a number of leadership positions including as Director of Grymsdyke Farm (2025-2026); Head of Architecture and Drue Heinz Curator at the Royal Academy (2021-2024); Associate Director, London School of Architecture (2017-2018), and director of Architecture, Design and Fashion at the British Council (2010-2016).

She began her career as a journalist and continues to write about architecture and design for a range of magazines and newspapers including Wallpaper*, Gagosian Quarterly and RIBA Journal.

== Biography ==
Richardson was born in London and grew up in Camden Town. She studied architecture at the University of Westminster after a foundation in art at Central St Martins, and a year studying painting at Chelsea School of Art where her tutor was the artist Roger Ackling. Richardson then trained to be a journalist, taking an NCTJ Certificate in Newspaper Writing at Napier University in Edinburgh, while apprenticing at the Birmingham Post, BBC and Solihull Times.

Her first roles as a journalist were at building trade magazines Public Sector Building and Public Service and Local Government. She was then Deputy Editor at the RIBA Journal before becoming Editor of leading design magazine Blueprint (2004-2010).

In 2015 Richardson completed an MA in Early Modern History at King’s College London. Her dissertation focused on the English publication and censorship of Common Sense, the first pamphlet by Thomas Paine, in 1776.

== Professional life ==
Richardson is well known for her work as Director of Architecture, Design and Fashion at the British Council, UK's international organisation for educational opportunities and cultural relations from 2010 to 2016. An important part of this role was to act as Commissioner of the British Pavilion at Venice Architecture Biennale. Exhibitions commissioned during this period included Villa Frankenstein, curated by muf architecture/art (2010); Venice Takeaway: Ideas to change British Architecture, co-curated by Richardson and Vanessa Norwood (2012); A Clockwork Jerusalem, curated by FAT and Crimson Architectural Historians (2014), and Home Economics, curated by Shumi Bose, Jack Self and Finn Williams (2016).

In the role of Commissioner of the British Pavilion, Richardson made a number of key changes including opening up the process to a public competition and initiating the Venice Fellowships, in which young practitioners and students have the opportunity to work in the pavilion alongside studying in Venice with support of institutions across the UK.

She established a number of opportunities for international designers and architects to present their work in the UK. She developed the International Architecture Showcase during London Festival of Architecture in partnership with embassies; and in 2012 as part of the Cultural Olympiad, she launched the International Fashion Showcase as part of London Fashion Week. While at the British Council she established the design blog, Back of the Envelope,.

Richardson continues to make links internationally and has a particular interest in China and the Gulf. In 2019 she worked with Lantao Design Academy to create the Lantao UK Fellowship to encourage and support links between British and Chinese designers. The fellowship was launched with a symposium at the Royal College of Art in September 2019, with speakers including Thomas Heatherwick, Edward Denison and Cristiano Ceccato.

Since 2024 she has worked on various architectural projects in UAE including editing a book about Wasit Wetland Centre by X Architects for the Aga Khan Architecture Award.

Richardson is a visiting lecturer at a number of design and architecture schools and is a MArch Thesis supervisor at the Bartlett School of Architecture. She was previously a Platform leader in Interior Urbanism on the MA Interior Design at the Royal College of Art (2018-2019), and was Associate Director at the London School of Architecture from 2017 to 2018. During this crucial phase of the school's development, she established a public programme and curated the exhibition Idencity, at the Roca London Gallery.

Richardson has held a number of trustee and advisory roles: she was a member of the Advisory panel of the V&A Dundee. She was previously Hon Treasurer of the Architectural Association, a Co-Director of the London Festival of Architecture, Chair of the Architecture Centre Network, and a member of the London Mayor's Cultural Strategy Group, which advised on the British capital's culture policy. She is regularly a member design juries including the Soane Medal; RA Architecture Prize; RIBA Architecture Awards; the D&AD Awards, and the Architect of the Year Awards.

== Exhibitions ==
Guangzhou Design Triennale (architecture section), Guangdong Museum of Art, Guangzhou, China (16 January to 31 May 2024).

Architecture Window, Ronald and Rita McAulay Gallery, Royal Academy of Arts (20 February 2024 to 29 November 2026)

Herzog & de Meuron, Gabrielle Jungels-Winkler Galleries, Royal Academy of Arts (14 July to 15 October 2023)

John Hejduk: London Masque, Ronald and Rita McAulay Gallery (22 March 2022 to 21 May 2023)

Light Lines: The Architectural Photographs of Hélène Binet, The Jillian and Arthur M. Sackler Wing of Galleries, Royal Academy of Arts (23 October 2021 to 23 January 2022)

Walid Siti: Right to Climb, 31 Oval Road (12 November 2020 to 30 June 2021) and Tobacco Factory, Bristol (installed 30 June 2021)

What Where: crossing boundaries in the architecture of Sala Beckett, Roca London Gallery (1 June to 31 August 2019)

Idencity: six designs from the LSA to challenge the identity of London, Roca London Gallery (4 June to 11 August 2018)

Venice Takeaway: Ideas to change British Architecture, The British Pavilion at the 13th Venice Architecture Biennale, co-curated by Richardson and Vanessa Norwood (29 August to 25 November 2012);

Paper City: Urban Utopias, The Architecture Space, Royal Academy of Arts, London (31 July to 27 October 2009)

== Published essays and books (selected) ==
Reading Design: Falling, Ed (Grymsdyke Farm, 2026)

‘Judgement’ in Five Critical Essays on the Crit, (Machine Books, 2023)

‘Spaces of Potential’ in Herzog & de Meuron (Royal Academy Publications, 2023)

Epilogue in Architecture and Collective Life (Routledge, 2022)

Interview with Hélène Binet in Light Lines (Royal Academy Publications, 2021)

‘Queen Caroline's Temple and the Origins of Experimental Design in Kensington Gardens’ in the Serpentine Pavilion catalogue (Serpentine Galleries, 2016)

‘Generational Shift’ in Out of the Ordinary: Young Korean Architects (ARKO, 2015)

Venice Takeaway, Ed (AA Publications, 2012) ‘Point of View’ in The Art of Dissent (Marshgate Press, 2012)

How Places Work (Commission for Architecture and the Built Environment, 2006)

New Vernacular Architecture (Laurence King, 2002)

In Defence of the Dome, with Penny Lewis and James Woudhuysen (ASI, 1999).
