= Declaration of Calton Hill =

2004 call for an independent Scotland

The Declaration of Calton Hill can refer to several political statements, the most notable being a call in 2004 for an independent Scottish republic, led by the Scottish Socialist Party. Calton Hill overlooks Edinburgh, and features neo-classical architecture built at the time of the Scottish Enlightenment. Rallys have been held there by multiple organisations. The 2004 declaration was part of a rally at Calton Hill in Edinburgh, organised to occur at the same time that Queen Elizabeth II was officially opening the new Scottish Parliament Building at Holyrood. Declarations with the same name have also been led by the Scottish National Party (SNP) in 1981, Democracy for Scotland- a non-political organisation in 1992, and others in 2023.

== History ==
=== 1981 declaration ===
On 25 October 1981 around 1,500 people gathered outside the empty Old Royal High School building. William Wolfe read out a declaration that included: "a call on the Scottish people to recognise the indivisible link between constitutional change and economic progress and regard this chamber as an example of how Scottish democracy has been imprisoned by Westminster."

=== 1992 declaration ===
Members of Democracy for Scotland, a non-political organisation, signed a document 100 days after the 1992 General Election. The group's commitment to work to 'secure a democratic and accountable system of government in Scotland' was symbolised by the declaration.

=== 2004 declaration ===
On 9 October 2004, a rally was organised to occur at the same time as the official opening of the new Scottish Parliament Building at Holyrood. This was the third time the Queen had addressed the Scottish Parliament. The first time had been at the opening of the parliament itself, on 1 July 1999, at the parliament's temporary home at the General Assembly Hall of the Church of Scotland; the second time had been during the Golden Jubilee when the Parliament was in session at the Conference Room, Kings College at the University of Aberdeen.

The Declaration takes the form of a petition to the government of the United Kingdom at Westminster.

The Declaration was attended by approximately 500 people, including several members of the Scottish Parliament, as well as some notable figures in literature, arts and music; the latter provided entertainment. In contrast, multiple thousands attended the procession and celebrations of the opening of the parliament building.

==== Origin and supporters ====
Although it was created by the Scottish Socialist Party, the petition does not explicitly call for socialism in Scotland. As such it has drawn supporters from a wide range of ideologies. In particular, the declaration was supported by some from Scotland's artistic community, including Edwin Morgan, Iain Banks, Alasdair Gray, Irvine Welsh and filmmaker Peter Mullan.

==== Aims of the Declaration ====
Primarily, the Declaration called for an independent Scotland, and characterised the nature of the potential future state, which would include liberty, equality, diversity and solidarity, as well as a non-hierarchical society. Sovereignty would rest with the People and not with a monarch or Parliament.

A written constitution was also desired, whereas currently the United Kingdom does not have a written constitution; although some oversight for laws is provided by the Human Rights Act. The Declaration stated that the hypothetical Scottish constitution would guarantee suffrage, freedom of speech and freedom of assembly; and would ensure a right of privacy and protection. It would also ensure freedom of information about government matters.

Written at a time of heightened anti-war feeling during the Iraq War, the Declaration called for "the power to refuse to send our sons and daughters to kill and die in unjust wars in foreign lands". Further, it called for "the power" to "banish nuclear weapons of mass destruction from our land". The UK's nuclear arsenal is based in Scotland.

==== Text of the 2004 declaration ====
To: Westminster Government

Declaration of Calton Hill, 9th October 2004

We the undersigned call for an independent Scottish republic built on the principles of liberty, equality, diversity and solidarity.

These principles can never be put into practice while Scotland remains subordinate to the hierarchical and anti-democratic institutions of the British State.

We believe these principles can be brought about by a freely elected Scottish Government with full control of Scotland's revenues.

We believe that the right to self determination is an inherent right, and not a boon or a favour to be granted to us whether by the Crown or the British State.

We believe that sovereignty rests in the people and vow to fight for the right to govern ourselves for the benefit of all those living in Scotland today, tomorrow and in future times. The Government of a country is servant to the people, not master of the people.

We believe that a written Constitution will guarantee, under law, everyone's right to freely vote, speak and assemble; and will guarantee the people's right to privacy and protection, and access to information on all its Government's doings.

We vow to fight for the power to refuse to send our sons and daughters to kill and die in unjust wars in foreign lands.

We vow to fight for the power to banish nuclear weapons of mass destruction from our land.

We vow to fight for the power to acquire and restrict the use of property or lands controlled by individuals, corporations or governments from beyond Scotland's borders.

We vow to fight for the power to turn our depopulated land into a haven for those fleeing famine and persecution.

We vow to fight for the power to build a more equal society, free of poverty, through the redistribution of our vast wealth.

We vow to fight for the power to protect our soil, seas and rivers for our children and for the generations to come.

We swear to oppose all forms of national chauvinism, imperialism and racism. We swear to oppose all forms of discrimination on the grounds of gender, ethnic origin, religion, place of birth, age, disability, sexuality or language.

We aim for an independent Scottish Republic in which people may live with dignity and with self respect, free from exploitation, assuming the responsibilities of free women and men.

An independent Scottish republic will negotiate freely and as an equal with governments of other lands.

Our aim is not to erect walls of separation, but to build an outward-looking, Scotland that will extend the hand of friendship to all the peoples of the world.

We vow to continue the struggle for a free, democratic Scottish republic for as long as it may take.

The fight is for freedom.

Sincerely, ............... The Undersigned

=== 2023 declaration ===
In March 2023, the Radical Independence Campaign (RIC) drew up a declaration to win support for the assertion of the republican, democratic sovereignty of the Scottish people.
