= Republic (pressure group) =

British republican pressure group

- Formation: 1983/2006
- Legal status: Limited company
- Purpose: Political advocacy
- Headquarters: London
- Region served: United Kingdom
- Members: 9,000 (May 2023)
- Chair: Harry Stratton
- CEO: Graham Smith
- Main organ: Board of directors
- Affiliations: Alliance of European Republican Movements
- Website: republic.org.uk

Republic is a British republican pressure group advocating the replacement of the monarchy of the United Kingdom with a de jure parliamentary republic. It is a member organisation of the Alliance of European Republican Movements and is the largest organisation solely campaigning for a republican constitution for Britain. Republic states that its mission is: "the replacement of hereditary monarchy with a democratic republican constitution". As of 2025, Harry Stratton is the current chair of Republic, and Graham Smith is the chief executive.

== History ==
Originally created by a small group of republicans in London in 1983, Republic was reinvented as a campaigning pressure group in 2006, when it became formally set up as a limited company (Republic Campaign Ltd) with a board of directors and executive office. During the period between the announcement of the engagement of Prince William and Catherine Middleton in 2010 and the Diamond Jubilee of Elizabeth II in 2012, the group's supporters increased from around 9,000 to around 30,000, with around 500 new members being gained at the time of the 2011 Royal Wedding. By 2015, the group had two full-time members of staff and an income of £140,000. In 2016, it had over 5,000 paying members and about 35,000 online supporters. After the 2023 coronation, Republic reported a surge in support, reaching 9,000 members.

== Campaigns and issues ==
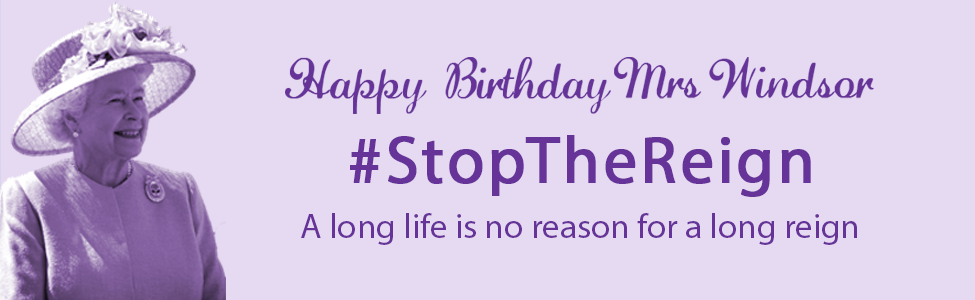
A 2016 Republic protest banner

CEO Graham Smith has criticised hereditary power as being "absurd", and monarchy as an outdated political institution that "abuses its position, abuses public money and which gives politicians too much power". Following the death of Elizabeth II, Republic briefly suspended public comments out of respect for the late Queen, and then returned to campaigning following the proclamation of accession of Charles III. Republic had stated in 2016 that after the death of Elizabeth II it would mount a campaign for a referendum on the future of the monarchy. The plan was to do this during the period between the Queen's funeral and the coronation of her successor, though this did not occur.

=== Royal secrecy ===
In December 2015, Republic published Royal Secrecy: A Report on Royal Secrecy and Power. The report argues that the "question of royal secrecy also presents a conundrum for the monarchy. In this modern world of highly connected citizens and networks that circumvent traditional sources of information continued secrecy will gradually erode public trust in the institution. Yet the fear of transparency so apparent in the palace's behaviour is very real."

Since 2015 a number of academics and biographers have called for an end to royal secrecy, with Index on Censorship releasing a new report in January 2023.

=== Royal finances ===
Republic asserts that there is a lack of transparency and accountability with respect to the funding of the monarchy. The group believes the royal finances should be independently audited by the National Audit Office, like all other central government departments, and that the monarchy's exemption from the Freedom of Information Act should be removed.

Republic's response to the annual royal finance reports is reported in the media. In 2017, Republic published its Royal Finances Report, which estimated the total cost of the monarchy to be at least £345m, once additional costs such as royal security, revenues from the Duchies and costs to local councils had been taken into account.

Republic's calculations do not factor in the profits of the Crown Estate, which are transferred to national funds in return for the civil list (a payment superseded by the Sovereign Grant in 2012); they assert that the Crown Estate is the property of the monarch only in their capacity as Head of State, and therefore state property.

=== Prince Charles and the Duchy of Cornwall ===
In May 2007, Republic persuaded Brian Iddon MP to table an early day motion about the lack of transparency in the Duchy of Cornwall's accounts. The Duke of Cornwall was at that time Prince Charles, who is now King Charles III. Following a legal ruling in 2011 that the Duchy of Cornwall was separate from Prince Charles for the purposes of regulation, Republic asked HM Revenue and Customs to investigate if the Duchy should still be exempt from tax. The tax exemption is based on the assumption that the Duchy estate is inseparable from the tax exempt person of Prince Charles, which has become open to question. In 2013, lobbying by Republic resulted in William Nye, Prince Charles's private secretary, appearing before the Public Accounts Committee to explain the Duchy's tax arrangements.

Republic regularly criticised Prince Charles for expressing forthright views and lobbying on political issues, which the group said was unconstitutional. It also called on the British Government to stop subsidising Charles' £16.3m annual income through grants and tax breaks. In 2015, Republic launched a campaign and petition, Take Back the Duchy, to abolish the Duchy of Cornwall and transfer its land and assets to the Crown Estate. In December 2015, a freedom of information request by Republic revealed that Prince Charles had routine access to confidential government papers.

=== Oaths of allegiance ===
In 2008, Republic launched a campaign to give republicans an alternative oath of allegiance. The campaign began with an Early Day Motion in the House of Commons and was taken up by human rights lawyer Louise Christian.

=== 2011 royal wedding ===
In advance of the 2011 wedding of Prince William and Catherine Middleton, the tourist organisation VisitBritain said that the event would be good for tourism. In response, Republic made a freedom of information request for VisitBritain documents which indicated that royal weddings had in the past had a negative effect on tourism. Republic held an alternative street party in London at the Royal Wedding, "celebrating democracy and people power rather than inherited privilege", along with other events across the UK's major cities. Republic's London event had initially been blocked by Camden Council.

=== BBC coverage of the monarchy ===
Republic has claimed that the BBC displays bias in relation to its reporting of royal matters. The documentary The Diamond Queen was criticised for this: in a letter to the chairman of the BBC Trust, Chris Patten, Republic's chief executive, Graham Smith, argued that the programme breached BBC guidelines on impartiality. In his letter, Smith claimed the series was subject to "distortions, half-truths and fabrications".

=== Requests for investigation and military discharge of Prince Andrew ===
In March 2016, Smith filed a formal report to the police, requesting an investigation into allegations that Prince Andrew, Duke of York had caused damage to sensor-operated gates in Windsor Great Park by forcing them open in his Range Rover to avoid going an extra mile on his way home. The Thames Valley force dismissed the reports due to lack of details.

On 13 January 2022, Republic released an open letter, signed by more than 150 military veterans, addressed to the Queen in her capacity as head of state and commander-in-chief of the armed forces, which contained a request that Prince Andrew be stripped of all his honorary military roles. In the letter, which was sent from Republic's London address, the signatories expressed "upset and anger" in the wake of a ruling (made the day before by the New York judge Lewis A. Kaplan) that Prince Andrew must face a civil lawsuit in the U.S. for alleged sexual assault brought by Virginia Giuffre, and they argued that it was "untenable" for the Duke of York to retain his positions in the armed forces. On receipt of the letter that day, Buckingham Palace declined to comment. Later in the day, Prince Andrew's military affiliations and royal patronages were returned to the Queen, and it was announced that he would defend the lawsuit as a "private citizen". The civil case was settled out of court in 2022, but in January 2024 previously-sealed court documents relating to Virginia Giuffre were published. In response to these Republic asked the Metropolitan Police to reopen its investigations into the allegations and called on King Charles to make a public statement.

=== Coronation of Charles III ===
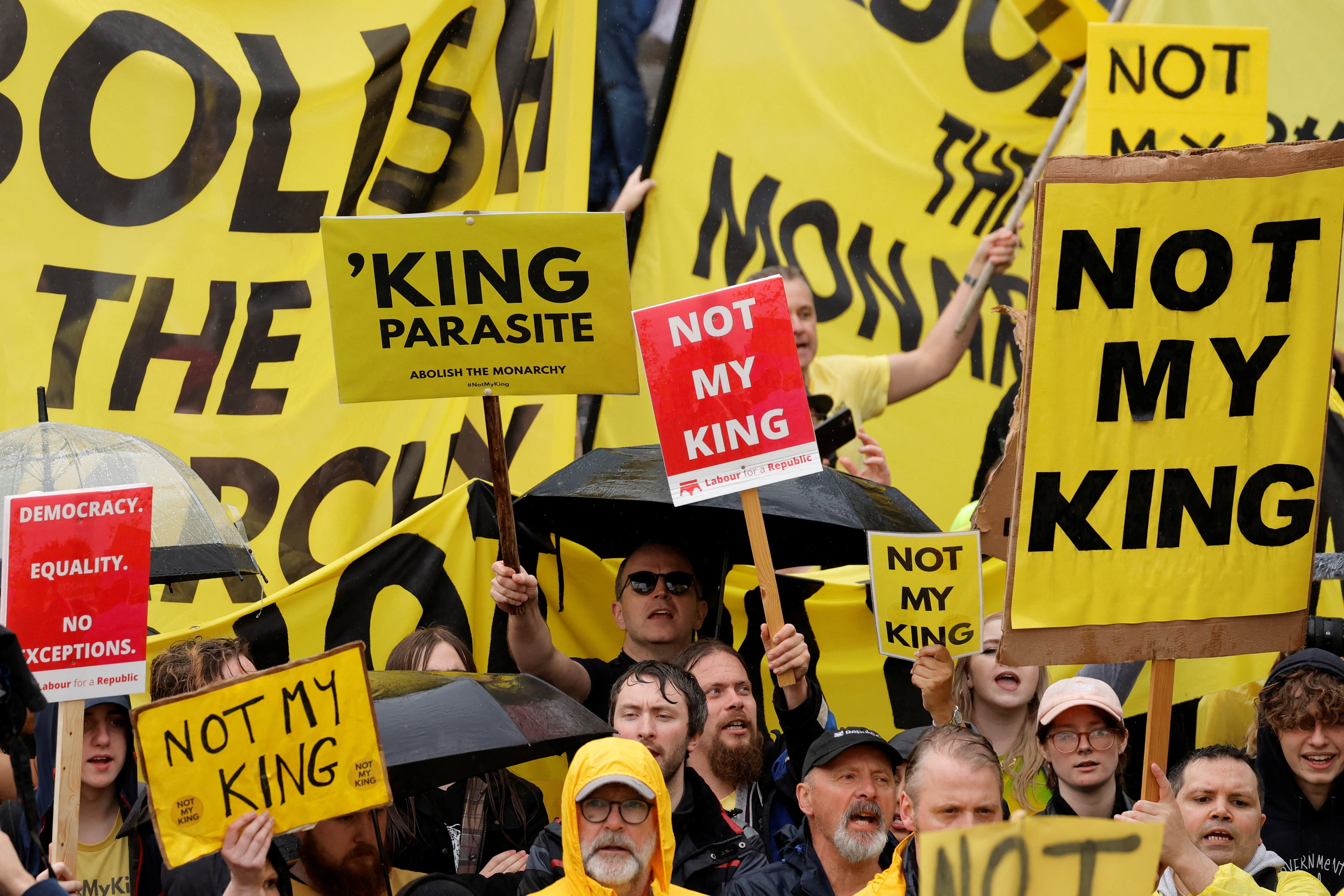
Protesters on Trafalgar Square on the day of the 2023 coronation

Prior to the coronation of Charles III and Camilla on 6 May 2023, Republic announced plans to hold demonstrations at Parliament Square in London against the ceremony, citing opposition to the extravagance of the event amidst the UK cost of living crisis. On the day of the coronation the Metropolitan Police took action against the protests, arresting a reported 52 people, including members of Republic. Republic's leader, Graham Smith, was held in police custody for nearly 16 hours. In addition, hundreds of Republic placards were reportedly seized. In an official statement, Republic condemned the arrests as "a direct attack on our democracy and the fundamental rights of every person in the country". Republic had previously held a number of discussions with senior Met officers, making clear their plans, which the Met had said they had no objections to. Police defended their actions, stating that they had confiscated lock-on devices which are banned for use in protests under the Public Order Act 2023.

=== From Below The Balcony ===
In March 2025 Republic started a new podcast, From Below The Balcony, in which hosts Graham Smith and Abigail Tarttelin interview vocal republicans from across the British commonwealth. Guests have included author Mark Haddon, journalist Kevin Maguire, former British MP and Minister of State Norman Baker, and Australian senator Lidia Thorpe.

The first season comprised ten episodes plus a live special recorded at Republic's 2025 Members Day. A second season began in June 2026.

== Legal context ==
Advocacy of the replacement of the monarchy with a republic has been an imprisonable offence in law. Section 3 of the Treason Felony Act 1848 prohibits the advocacy of a republic in print. The penalty for such advocacy, even if the republic is to be set up by peaceful means, is lifetime imprisonment. This Act remains in force in the United Kingdom. In R v Attorney General, ex parte Rusbridger [2003] UKHL 38, the Law Lords dismissed an application by the editor of The Guardian to have the Act declared incompatible with the European Convention on Human Rights or declared not to apply to advocating change by peaceful means. Nonetheless, they stated obiter that although the Treason Felony Act remains on the statute books the Human Rights Act 1998 requires it to be interpreted so as to be compatible with the Convention, and therefore such a prosecution could not possibly succeed:

It is plain as a pike staff to the respondents [i.e. The Guardian] and everyone else that no one who advocates the peaceful abolition of the monarchy and its replacement by a republican form of government is at any risk of prosecution. Whatever may be the correct construction of section 3, taken by itself, it is clear beyond any peradventure first, that the section would now be "read down" as required by section 3 of the Human Rights Act 1998 so that the advocacy contemplated by the respondents could not constitute a criminal offence, and second, that no Attorney-General or Director of Public Prosecutions would or could authorize a prosecution for such advocacy without becoming a laughing stock. To do so would plainly be an unlawful act under section 6(1) of the 1998 Act.

— Lord Scott of Foscote, R (Rusbridger) v Attorney General, paragraph 40

== See also ==
- Labour for a Republic
- List of British republicans
- Republicanism in the United Kingdom
- Scottish republicanism
