= Edward Denison =

Edward Denison may refer to:

- Edward Denison (philanthropist) (1840–1870), English philanthropist and politician
- Edward Denison (bishop) (1801–1854), English bishop
- Edward E. Denison (1873–1953), American congressman
- Edward Fulton Denison (1915–1992), American economist
