= Sectarianism in Glasgow =

Sectarian rivalry between Catholics and Protestants in Glasgow

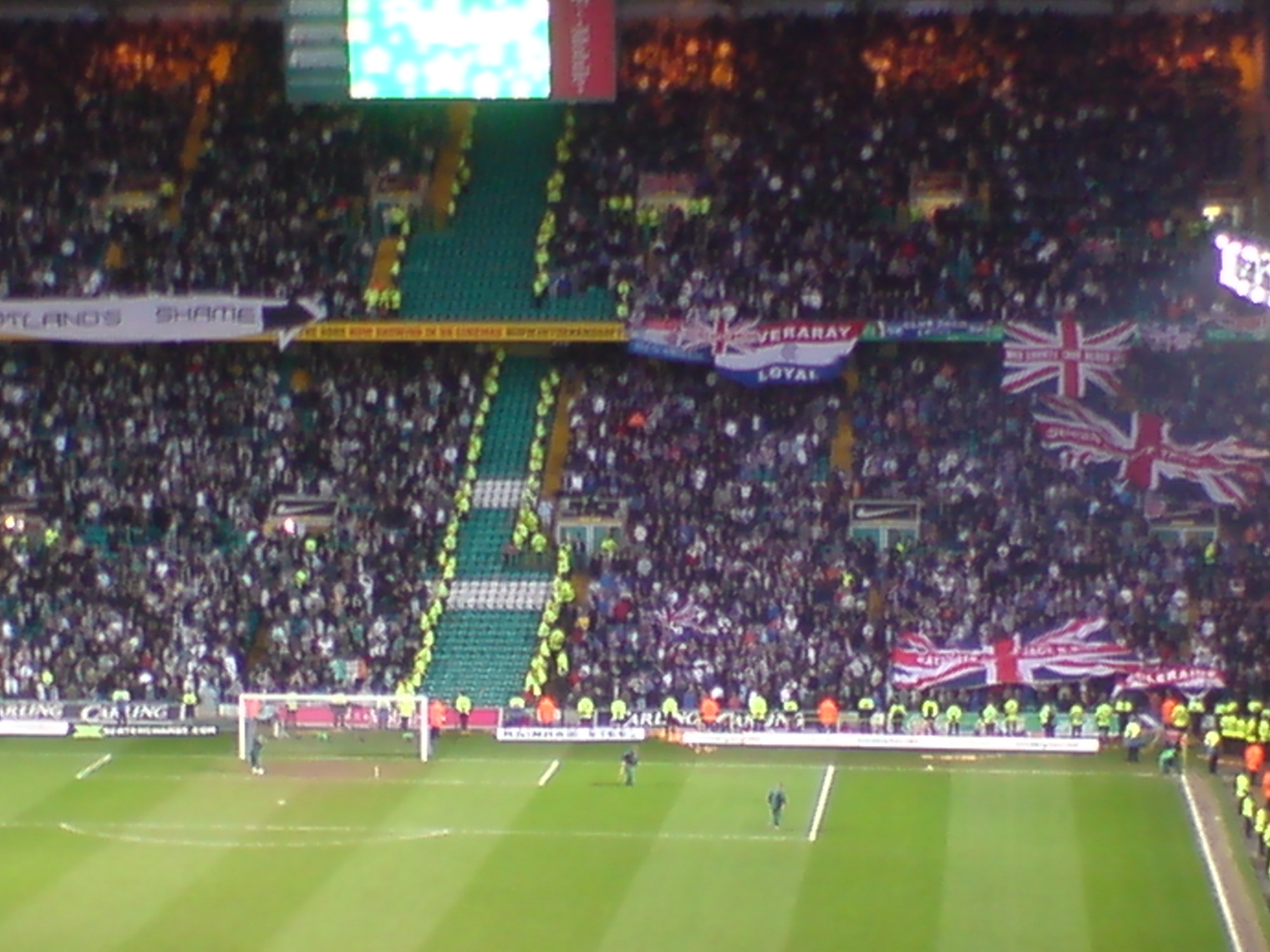
Supporters of Celtic (left) and Rangers during an Old Firm match at Celtic Park in 2008. The Union Jack flags signify the Unionist political views of many Rangers supporters.

Sectarianism in Glasgow takes the form of long-standing religious and political sectarian rivalry between Catholics and Protestants.

From roughly the fifth century AD, Catholic Christianity was the main religion in what is now Scotland, but after the Scottish Reformation, Scotland officially adopted Presbyterianism (the Church of Scotland) as its state religion. Due to economic hardship, especially following the Great Famine and during a period of rapid growth in the industrial towns of Scotland's Central Belt, many Irish Catholic emigrants settled in those industrial towns, with Glasgow attracting a particularly large number. This migration led to increased competition for employment and housing and, in some instances, antagonism and conflict between competing groups. In addition to this, religious discrimination and established social networks augmented the tension between Protestants and Catholics. Moreover, Irish Protestants also migrated to the same industrial towns in the Central Belt of Scotland.

== Incidents ==
Deaths and serious assaults have been directly linked to sectarian tensions within the city. Many of these have occurred either before or after Old Firm football matches. The 1995 murder of Mark Scott, a Celtic fan, by Jason Campbell resulted in the formation of the anti-sectarianism charity Nil By Mouth.

In June 2003, after the publication of the Scottish Executive's Action Plan on Tackling Sectarianism in Scotland, Section 74 of the Criminal Justice (Scotland) Act 2003 was implemented. This set out the situations when a criminal offence was aggravated by religious prejudice.

In 2004 and 2005, sectarian incidents reported to police in Scotland increased by 50% to 440 over 18 months. Scottish Government statistics showed that 64% of the 726 cases in the period were motivated by hatred against Catholics, and by hatred against Protestants in most of the remaining cases (31%) – indicating that "religious" intolerance was more than 5x more likely to be experienced by Catholics compared to Protestants, as recipient of more than double the number incidents was experienced by 16% of the population identifying as Catholic, vs. 42% identifying as Church of Scotland.

In the five years before 2011, annually there were between 600 and 700 charges of an offence aggravated by religious prejudice in Scotland.

== Football ==
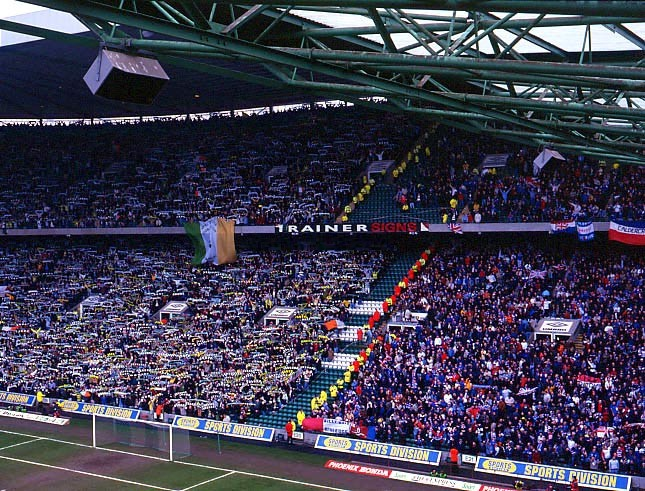
An Irish tricolour flag visibly held by Celtic fans (left) and the Union Jack and Ulster Banner of Northern Ireland flag visible in the Rangers fans section (right)

Sectarianism in Glasgow is particularly visible in the rivalry between the supporters of Glasgow's two main football clubs, Celtic and Rangers, together known as the Old Firm. One study showed that 74% of Celtic supporters identify themselves as Catholic, whereas only 10% identify as Protestant; for Rangers fans, the figures are 2% and 65%, respectively. At Rangers' Ibrox Stadium, the Union Flag and Ulster banner are often displayed, whilst at Celtic Park, the Irish tricolour is often displayed.

During the late 19th century, many immigrants came to Glasgow from Ireland, of whom around 75% were Catholic and around 25% Protestant. The foundation of Celtic, a club with a distinct Irish Catholic identity, was crucial in the subsequent adoption by Rangers of a Protestant, Unionist identity. From around the 1920s onwards Rangers had an unofficial policy of not signing Catholic players or employing Catholics in other roles. Particularly from the 1970s, Rangers came under increasing social and media pressure to change their stance, despite several of the club's directors continuing to deny its existence.

In 1989, Rangers signed Mo Johnston, their first major openly Roman Catholic signing in recent times whose transfer drew widespread attention not only due to his religion but as a former Celtic player, who had tentatively agreed to rejoin them before Rangers offered better financial terms and outbid their rivals. Johnston was the highest-profile Catholic to sign for the club since the World War I era, although several players of the faith featured prior to that point. Since Johnston's signing, an influx of overseas footballers has contributed to Catholic players becoming commonplace at Rangers. In 1999 Lorenzo Amoruso became the first Catholic captain of the club.

One Rangers spokesman used the term "90-minute bigot" to explain part of the problem of religious bigotry among supporters and suggested this bigotry should be dealt with first.

While the majority of Celtic fans are Catholic, some of the key figures in the club's history (Jock Stein, Kenny Dalglish, and Danny McGrain amongst others) have come from a Protestant background.

In recent times, both Old Firm teams have taken measures to combat sectarianism. Working alongside the Scottish Parliament, church groups, pressure groups such as Nil by Mouth, schools and community organisations, the Old Firm have endeavoured to clamp down on sectarian songs, inflammatory flag-waving, and troublesome supporters, using increased levels of policing and surveillance.

Both Celtic and Rangers have launched campaigns to stamp out sectarian violence and songs. Celtic's Bhoys Against Bigotry, Rangers' Follow With Pride (previously called Pride Over Prejudice) and the cross-club Sense Over Sectarianism campaigns have attempted to reduce the connection between the Old Firm and sectarianism.

In August 2003, Rangers launched its 'Pride Over Prejudice' campaign to promote social inclusion, which has urged fans to wear only traditional Rangers colours and avoid offensive songs, banners and salutes. This involved publishing the 'Blue Guide', known as the "Wee Blue Book", which contained a list of acceptable songs and was issued to 50,000 supporters in August 2007.

Research, however, suggests that football is unlikely to be the main source of sectarianism in Glasgow. An audit from the Crown Office in 2006 of religiously aggravated crimes in Scotland between January 2004 and June 2005, found that 33% of these were related to football. Given that 57% of religiously aggravated crimes in Scotland happened in Glasgow, at the very most approximately half of religiously aggravated crimes in Glasgow could have been football related in this period.

In 2011, Celtic staff and fans, including then-manager Neil Lennon, were sent suspected explosive devices and bullets. Subsequently, Dr John Kelly of University of Edinburgh suggested that "Recent events have buried the myth that anti-Irish Catholic bigotry no longer exists."

== Orangeism and Irish republicanism ==
The Orangemen of Glasgow (members of the Protestant Orange Institution), parade in the city around the historic date of the Twelfth (12 July), commemorating the victory of King William of Orange's Williamite army over the deposed King James Stuart's Jacobite army at the Battle of the Boyne in 1690 following the Glorious Revolution two years earlier. Irish republican marches use much the same format to commemorate various important dates in the history of Irish republicanism, such as the Irish Rebellion of 1798 and the 1981 hunger strike. The two main Irish republican organisations in Glasgow are Cairde na hÉireann and the West of Scotland Band Alliance, both of which claim to represent Irish republicans in Scotland. These marches are often a source of tension (and are now subject to stricter controls as a result), with each side accusing the other of supporting Northern Ireland-based paramilitary groups such as the Irish Republican Army and Irish National Liberation Army or Ulster Volunteer Force and Ulster Defence Association.

According to The Review of Marches and Parades in Scotland by Sir John Orr, of the 338 notified processions in Glasgow in 2003 nearly 85% were from Orange organisations (Orr 2005, p. 67). A report into orange parades in Glasgow from Strathclyde Police in October 2009 highlighted the increased number of common, serious and racially motivated assaults associated with the marches. These included assaults against the police. There was also a rise in arrests for weapons possession, vandalism, breach of the peace and street drinking.

A series of developments during the 2010–2011 football season has led to an intense public debate over the question of the nature and extent of religious sectarianism in Scotland. The Scottish National Party (SNP) government has responded with a new piece of legislation which has been widely criticised and has prompted some commentators to speculate about a political "own goal". Some commentators have suggested that the Irish roots of the problem in Scotland should be properly acknowledged, and that a possible way forward could involve cooperation between Scotland, Northern Ireland and the Republic of Ireland within the structures and procedures of the British–Irish Council (BIC).

== Prevalence ==
Steve Bruce, who has studied the decline in religious adherence in Western Europe, says surveys comparing people's ideas about sectarianism with their actual day-to-day personal experience show that the perception of sectarianism is much stronger than its occurrence in reality, and that the city's problems with health, education and social exclusion are of much greater daily concern to most Glaswegians.

Bruce also found that less than a third of one per cent of murders in Scotland over nearly two decades had any sectarian motive, and those that did were the result of football allegiances, not religion or ethnicity.

== See also ==
- Glasgow pub bombings
- Sectarian violence
- Nil by Mouth, an anti-sectarian charity
- Anti-Catholicism
- Anti-Catholicism in the United Kingdom
- Anti-Protestantism
- Politics and sports
