= HM Advocate v Coulson =

Trial of Andy Coulson

- Court: High Court of Justiciary
- Full case name: Her Majesty's Advocate v Andrew Coulson

Case history
- Related action: HM Advocate v Sheridan and Sheridan

Court membership
- Judge sitting: David Burns, Lord Burns

Her Majesty's Advocate v Andrew Coulson was the trial of Andy Coulson, a former editor of the News of the World and former Director of Communications for David Cameron, on charges of perjury.

He was detained by Strathclyde Police on 30 May 2012 in London, and taken to Helen Street police station in Glasgow. He was later charged with having committed perjury in 2010 during HM Advocate v Sheridan and Sheridan.

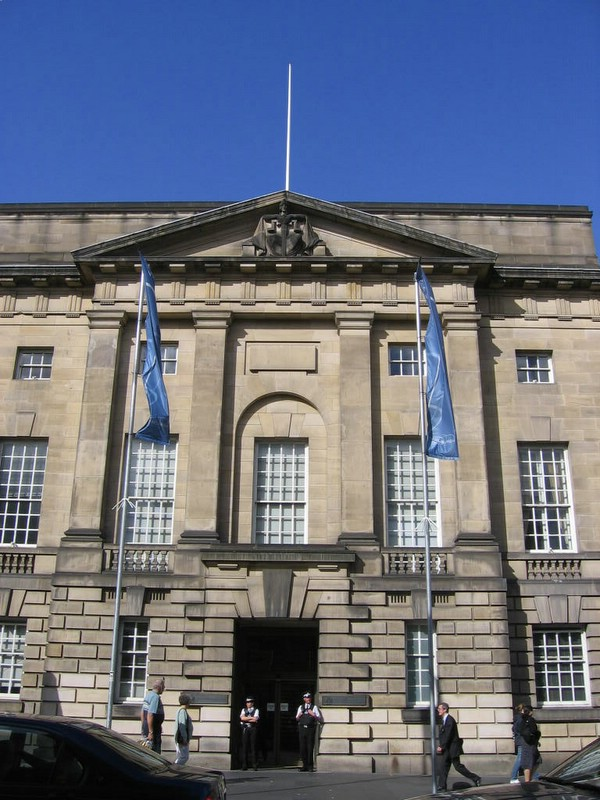
Edinburgh High Court

He appeared at Glasgow Sheriff Court on 13 June 2013 in private, represented by Richard Keen; no plea or declaration was made and he was given bail. There was a ban on reporting this at the time, but it was challenged by some media outlets and lifted a few days later.

On 6 August a preliminary hearing took place at Glasgow High Court, he was not present, but the indictment was made public.

The trial was scheduled to begin on 21 April 2015, and to last 6 weeks. It was postponed because of the general election, and eventually started on 15 May 2015 at the Edinburgh High Court, with a jury of nine men and six women, presided over by judge David Burns, Lord Burns, Coulson was represented by Murdo MacLeod.

On 1 June 2015, the judge acquitted Coulson. However, the acquittal was suspended while the Crown considered whether to appeal the decision and was therefore not announced until 3 June. Explaining his ruling, Lord Burns said that for Coulson to be found guilty it was necessary for the Crown to prove that the allegedly untrue evidence he had given at the 2010 Sheridan trial had been relevant to the issues in it. The judge added that it was for him, and not the jury, to decide on this aspect of the case and that the Crown’s legal submissions had failed to satisfy him that Coulson’s evidence had been sufficiently relevant to the Sheridan trial.
