= Mike Gonzalez (historian) =

British historian and literary critic (born 1943)

in 2026

Mike Gonzalez (born 1943) is a British historian and literary critic who was Professor of Latin American Studies in the Hispanics Department of the University of Glasgow.

He has written widely on Latin America, especially Cuba and the Cuban Revolution of 1959. He characterizes Cuba as a state-capitalist economy rather than socialist.

A long-time member of the British Socialist Workers Party, he testified in Tommy Sheridan's defence at the Sheridan defamation trial and HM Advocate v Sheridan and Sheridan. Gonzalez is also a member of Solidarity – Scotland's Socialist Movement, the party Sheridan formed after the split in the Scottish Socialist Party.

Dr Francis King (University of East Anglia) wrote: Mike Gonzalez "allows his own (trotskisant) sympathies to intrude too obtrusively into his analysis."

== Selected articles/works ==
- Cuba, Castro and Socialism (with Peter Binns) (1980)
- Cuba, socialism and the third world with Peter Binns and Alex Callinicos) (1980)
- Nicaragua : revolution under siege (1985)
- Nicaragua : what went wrong? (1990)
- Revolution and Counter-Revolution in Chile
- Which way forward for the movement? (with Alex Callinicos) (2002)
- Che Guevara and the Cuban Revolution (2004)
- Bolivia: Rising of a People(2005)
- A rebel's guide to Marx (2005)
- The split in the Scottish Socialist Party(2006)
- Hugo Chávez: Socialist for the Twenty-First Century (2014)
- The Last Drop: The Politics of Water (2015) with Marianella Yanes
