= Evan Kohlmann =

American terrorism consultant (born 1979)

Evan F. Kohlmann
- Born: 1979 (age 46–47)
- Education: Georgetown University; University of Pennsylvania Law School
- Occupations: Terrorism consultant; senior investigator; terrorism analyst; expert witness
- Employer(s): The Nine Eleven Finding Answers Foundation; NBC News
- Notable work: Al- Qaida's Jihad in Europe: The Afghan-Bosnian Network

Evan F. Kohlmann (born 1979) is an American cyberintelligence professional who is the founder and chief executive officer of Cloudburst Technologies. Before founding the company, he worked as a terrorism consultant for the FBI, DOJ, SO15, and other government agencies.

He is a contributor to the Counterterrorism Blog, a senior investigator with The Nine Eleven Finding Answers Foundation, and a terrorism analyst for NBC News.

In his manifesto Anders Behring Breivik copied 25 pages verbatim from an ideological text by Evan Kohlmann and published by an institute led by Magnus Ranstorp.

== Early life and education ==
In the profile for the Penn Law Journal, Kohlmann said he spent summers in France while growing up, because his father studied there. Kohlmann graduated from Pine Crest School in Fort Lauderdale, Florida.

He attended the Georgetown University Edmund A. Walsh School of Foreign Service, where he studied under Mamoun Fandy. Fandy's mentorship sparked his interest in Middle East politics. "When [Fandy] lived in Egypt, he passed by the number two guy in al-Qaeda there every day. He really knew his subject."

Kohlmann entered the University of Pennsylvania Law School in the fall of 2001, a few weeks before al-Qaeda's attacks on the U.S. on September 11, 2001.

== Counter-terrorism career ==
Kohlmann worked as an intern at The Investigative Project, a Washington, DC, counter-terrorism think-tank.

He wrote Al- Qaida’s Jihad in Europe: The Afghan-Bosnian Network.

He is a Senior Terrorism Consultant for The NEFA Foundation. He is also a contributor to the Counterterrorism Blog, and a terrorism analyst for NBC News.

He has called Anwar al-Awlaki "one of the principal jihadi luminaries for would-be homegrown terrorists. His fluency with English, his unabashed advocacy of jihad and mujahideen organizations, and his Web-savvy approach are a powerful combination." He calls al-Awlaki's lecture "Constants on the Path of Jihad", which he says was based on a similar document written by al-Qaeda in Saudi Arabia's founder, the "virtual bible for lone-wolf Muslim extremists."

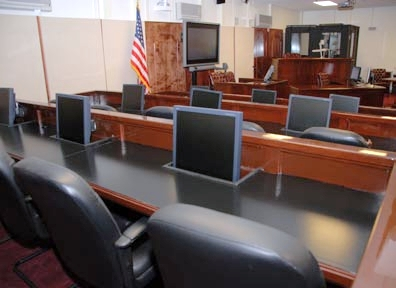
Guantanamo courtroom

He produced The Al Qaida Plan, a 90-minute movie, to serve as evidence and stress relief during the Guantanamo Military Commissions, which was sponsored by the Office of Military Commissions. According to Carol Rosenberg of the Miami Herald: "He modeled the video after The Nazi Plan, an instructional movie shown at the late 1940s Nuremberg tribunals for the most senior Nazi leadership."

Initially Captain Keith Allred, the President of Salim Ahmed Hamdan's Military Commission ruled that the film would be prejudicial, but he reversed this decision.

=== Expert witness ===
Kohlmann has served frequently as an expert witness for the prosecution in terrorism trials. "There haven’t been that many cases yet, so sometimes the prosecutors are doing their first ones. I know how the courts work, so I am pretty valuable right now.” Despite being considered a terrorism expert, Kohlmann cannot read, write or speak Arabic.

His expertise and neutrality have been disputed by defense attorneys and other experts, while his book ″Al-Qaida's Jihad in Europe: The Afghan-Bosnian Network″ was declined by University of Pennsylvania Press.

He testified as an expert witness in the following cases:

Case	Defendant	Notes
U.S. v. Sabri Benkhala	Sabri Benkhala	
U.S. v. Ali Timimi	Ali al-Timimi	
U.S. v. Uzair Paracha	Uzair Paracha	
U.S. v. Ali Asad Chandia	Ali Asad Chandia	Teacher at an Islamic school in Maryland, charged with providing material support to Lashkar-e-Taiba.
U.S. v. Yassin Aref	Yassin Aref	Kohlmann was a last-minute replacement for the prosecution's original witness, Rohan Gunaratna.
U.S. v. Rafiq Sabir	Rafiq Abdus Sabir	Medical doctor who allegedly agreed to provide clandestine medical treatment to wounded jihadists, and to have sworn bayat to a government agent pretending to be al-Qaeda official.
U.S. v. Emadeddine Muntasser	Emadeddine Muntasser	
Regina v. Mohammed Ajmal Khan and Palvinder Singh	Mohammed Ajmal Khan; Palvinder Singh	
H.M.A. v. Lawyers	Mohammed Atif Sidique	Bin Laden's driver's trial
Regina v. Samina Malik	Samina Malik	
Regina v. Hassan Mutegombwa	Hassan Mutegombwa	
Regina v. Tsouli	Younes Tsouli (Irhabi 007)	Convicted of inciting terrorist murder through the publication of Al Qaeda propaganda on the internet.

== Publications ==
- Evan Kohlmann (December 20, 1999). "A Bitter Harvest: The Soviet Intervention in Afghanistan and its Effects on Afghan Political Movements" (PDF). Georgetown University. Archived from the original (PDF) on June 14, 2007.
- Evan Kohlmann (April 17, 2001). "The Legacy of the Arab-Afghans: A Case Study" (PDF). Georgetown University. Archived from the original (PDF) on October 21, 2006.
- Evan Kohlmann (January 2, 2003). ""Axis of Evil": Indicted Hamas leader linked to al Qaeda activist in Midwest". National Review.
- Evan F. Kohlmann (2004). Al-Qaida's Jihad in Europe: The Afghan-Bosnian Network. Berg. ISBN 1-85973-807-9. "Evan Kohlmann."
- Evan Kohlmann (May 14, 2004). "Breeding Ground: A home for al Qaeda in Iraq". National Review.
- Evan Kohlmann (September–October 2006). "The Real Online Terrorist Threat". Foreign Affairs. Archived from the original on March 2, 2008.
- Evan Kohlmann (December 2008). "Inside As-Sahaab: The Story of Ali al-Bahlul and the Evolution of Al-Qaida's Propaganda" (PDF). NEFA Foundation. Archived (PDF) from the original on March 6, 2009.
- Evan F. Kohlmann (2008) (2008). "Homegrown" Terrorists: Theory and Cases in the War on Terror's Newest Front". Annals of the American Academy of Political and Social Science. 618 (1): 95–109. doi:10.1177/0002716208317203. S2CID 144206641.

== See also ==
- Jarret Brachman
- Steven Emerson
- Rita Katz
