= HM Advocate v Muirhead =

2012 criminal trial in Glasgow, Scotland

HM Advocate v Muirhead and McKenzie
- Court: High Court of Justiciary
- Full case name: Her Majesty's Advocate v Trevor Muirhead and Neil McKenzie

Court membership
- Judge sitting: Lord Turnbull

Her Majesty's Advocate v Trevor Muirhead and Neil McKenzie was a criminal trial of two men at the Glasgow High Court.

They were charged with sending parcel bombs to several people associated with Celtic F.C., including their manager Neil Lennon, former MSP Trish Godman, senior lawyer Paul McBride and Cairde na hÉireann, an Irish republican group.

The trial started on 27 February 2012. Witnesses included two postal workers who spotted suspicious packages, and a police officer.

Paul McBride, who was due to appear as a witness, died suddenly on 4 March. On 5 March the judge suspended the trial for one day as a mark of respect.

On 29 March the charges against the accused were reduced from conspiracy to murder to conspiracy to assault.

On 30 March both accused were found guilty of most of the charges against them. They had been in custody since May 2011, and in April were both sentenced to 5 years in prison.

== See also ==
- Trial by jury in Scotland
