= Paul McBride =

Scottish lawyer; Queen's Counsel

- Born: 13 November 1964
- Died: 4 March 2012 (aged 47); Pakistan
- Burial place: St Conval's, Barrhead
- Education: LLB, University of Strathclyde, 1983
- Occupation: Criminal lawyer
- Known for: One of the youngest ever in the UK to be appointed Queen's Counsel
- Partner: Gary Murphy (2007)

Paul McBride QC (13 November 1964 – 4 March 2012) was a Scottish criminal lawyer based in Edinburgh. He was a board member of the Scottish Legal Aid Board, and a former vice chairman of the Faculty of Advocates Criminal Bar Association. He died suddenly on a trip to Pakistan.

== Education ==
McBride, an only child from a working-class family, attended the private Catholic Jesuit school St Aloysius' College, Glasgow and thereafter studied law at the University of Strathclyde from the age of 16. He graduated with an LLB aged 19, and joined a solicitors firm in Ayrshire. After completing his two-year traineeship with the firm he devilled with a practising advocate for nine months, and was admitted advocate in 1988. He was appointed Queen's Counsel in 2000 aged 36, one of the youngest ever in the UK.

== Legal career ==
McBride was very well known for his intelligence, his skillful advancement of the merits of Scottish Law as well as his courage. He often represented high-profile clients in controversial criminal cases. He led the legal teams which won the acquittal of human rights lawyer Aamer Anwar of contempt of court in July 2008, and Gail Sheridan of perjury in HM Advocate v Sheridan and Sheridan. When he was appointed to the latter case the Daily Record called it a "legal dream team".

In 2009, McBride defended Rangers and Scotland goalkeeper Allan McGregor on sex attack claims, which never reached court.

Later, McBride represented Celtic F.C. on a number of legal and disciplinary matters. He issued statements to the press about incidents that involved Celtic and defended Celtic's staff in court including touchline bans for their manager, drink driving charges, charges of child neglect and speaking out about football officials.

In April 2011, McBride branded the SFA "the laughing stock of world football", and "not merely dysfunctional and dishonest, but biased". This statement came after an SFA disciplinary hearing involving three members of Rangers staff. McBride later apologized for the remarks after the SFA threatened legal action and made a formal complaint to the Faculty of Advocates.

== Personal life ==
McBride was a fan of football club Celtic and was considered to be one of the club's "highest profile supporters". McBride was gay and had been in a civil partnership with his partner Gary Murphy since 2007.

=== Politics ===
In April 2009, McBride made a high-profile defection from the Scottish Labour Party to the Scottish Conservative and Unionist Party.

On 6 November 2011, McBride resigned from the Scottish Conservative Party hours after the election of leader Ruth Davidson, describing the party as "divided and dysfunctional" and "a bunch of unreconstructed morons".

=== Bomb threat ===
In April 2011, McBride, Neil Lennon and Trish Godman, public figures all connected with Celtic, were sent parcel bombs. The device sent to McBride was intercepted by Royal Mail at a depot in Kilwinning. This resulted in the trial of two men, HM Advocate v Muirhead and McKenzie, in which McBride was due to appear as a witness, but died before he was called.

Trevor Muirhead, 44, and Neil McKenzie, 42 were later jailed for five years, having been found guilty of sending devices in the post to McBride, Celtic manager Neil Lennon, and Trish Godman.

=== Death ===
On 4 March 2012 McBride died in his sleep while in Pakistan. He was visiting Pakistan on business with fellow lawyer Aamer Anwar. His body was discovered in a hotel room in the city Lahore by Anwar, who said later that McBride had been unwell during the trip. A post-mortem examination carried out on McBride has found that there were no suspicious circumstances surrounding his death. The post-mortem was carried out at the Mayo Hospital in Lahore, Pakistan. His Requiem Mass was held in St Aloysius' Church, Garnethill, Glasgow, and many prominent figures in Scottish public life attended, including First Minister Alex Salmond, and Neil Lennon, then manager of Celtic FC, who was a pall bearer. He was buried in St Conval's, Barrhead.

== Obituaries ==
- Obituary: Paul McBride QC, high-profile criminal lawyer who was appointed Queen’s Council at the age of just 35 The Scotsman, 5 March 2012
- Paul McBride obituary The Guardian, 5 March 2012
- Paul McBride, QC The Herald, 5 March 2012
