= Operation Rubicon (disambiguation) =

Operation Rubicon was a 1970–2018 secret operation by (West) Germany and the United States to intercept encrypted communications of other countries.

Operation Rubicon may also refer to:

- Operation Rubicon (police investigation), a Scottish investigation into allegations of phone hacking, breach of data protection and perjury
- Operation Rubicon, codename of the 1851 French coup d'état
