= Catriona Grant =

Catriona Mary Grant is a former co-chair and former women's officer of the Scottish Socialist Party. She was instrumental in the split from the CWI international which established the SSP during the "Scottish Debate" of the late-90s.

She was the chair of the Edinburgh Old Town Community Council and an active member of Save Our Old Town. She is also an active campaigner for abortion rights against domestic abuse and sexual exploitation.

In 2008, she was nominated as a "local heroine" in Scottish Women's Aid's national survey, conducted for international women's day.

== Other information ==
She was one of several SSP members who gave evidence during the Sheridan libel trial co-chairing the meeting of 9 November, which became a pivotal point in the trial She was also a witness at the subsequent perjury trial HM Advocate v Sheridan and Sheridan.

She works as Senior Social Worker in Edinburgh, and was one of the co-ordinators on the GIRFEC project.
