= Helen Street police station =

Police station in Glasgow, Scotland

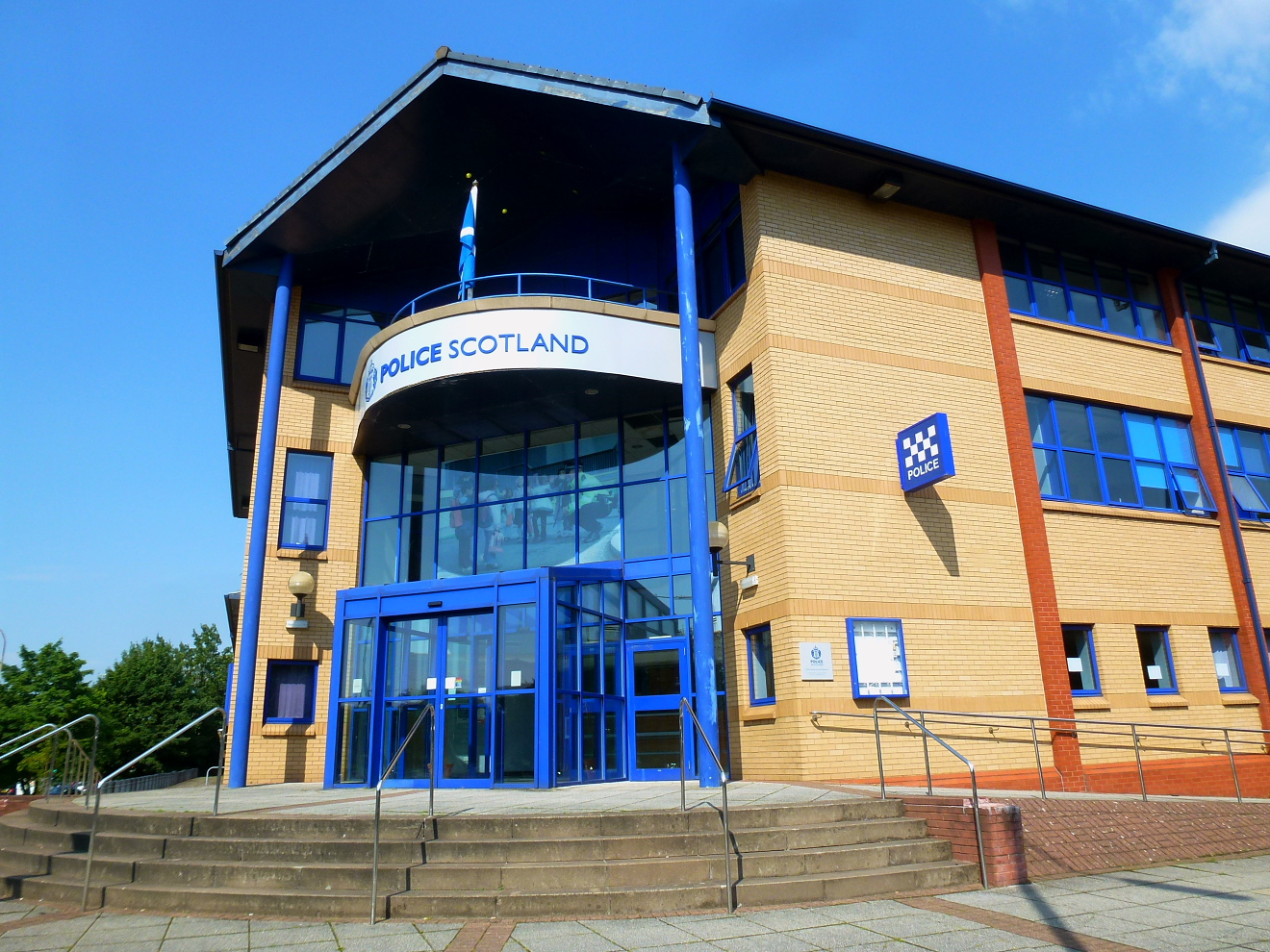

Helen Street police station, also known as Govan police station, in the Craigton (greater Govan) district of Glasgow, is the most secure police station in Scotland.

The fortified station, situated just south of the M8 motorway, is operated by Police Scotland (the successor to Strathclyde Police). While having the functions of a typical local policing base with a counter for public enquiries and assistance, it is additionally the base of the Major Crime and Terrorism Investigation Unit for Scotland and can be used, for example, for detaining suspects arrested under the Terrorism Act.

It was built on the site of White City Stadium, used for greyhound racing and motorcycle speedway until 1972. The new building replaced a 19th-century station on Orkney Street in central Govan and was opened in 1998; its main entrance is at the junction of Helen Street and Paisley Road West (A761), opposite Bellahouston Park and specifically the Palace of Art fitness centre.

There are two other police buildings further north on the same road and sometimes also referred to as 'Helen Street', however these are dedicated, non-public facing facilities used for Communications (Service Centre and Control Room) and Operational Services (including Road Policing).

== Suspected criminals detained and questioned at Govan ==
- Bilal Abdulla, arrested after the 2007 Glasgow International Airport attack
- Andy Coulson, Conservative Party political strategist and Downing Street Director of Communications under Prime Minister David Cameron, charged with perjury during HM Advocate v Sheridan and Sheridan
- Nazzedine Menni, the only person charged in connection with the 2010 Stockholm bombings
- Mohammed Atif Siddique, found guilty of "collecting terrorist-related information, setting up websites...and circulating inflammatory terrorist publications", but later cleared on appeal.

== See also ==
- Paddington Green Police Station
- Anti-terrorism legislation
  - Terrorism Acts
