= Aamer Anwar =

Scottish lawyer (born 1967)

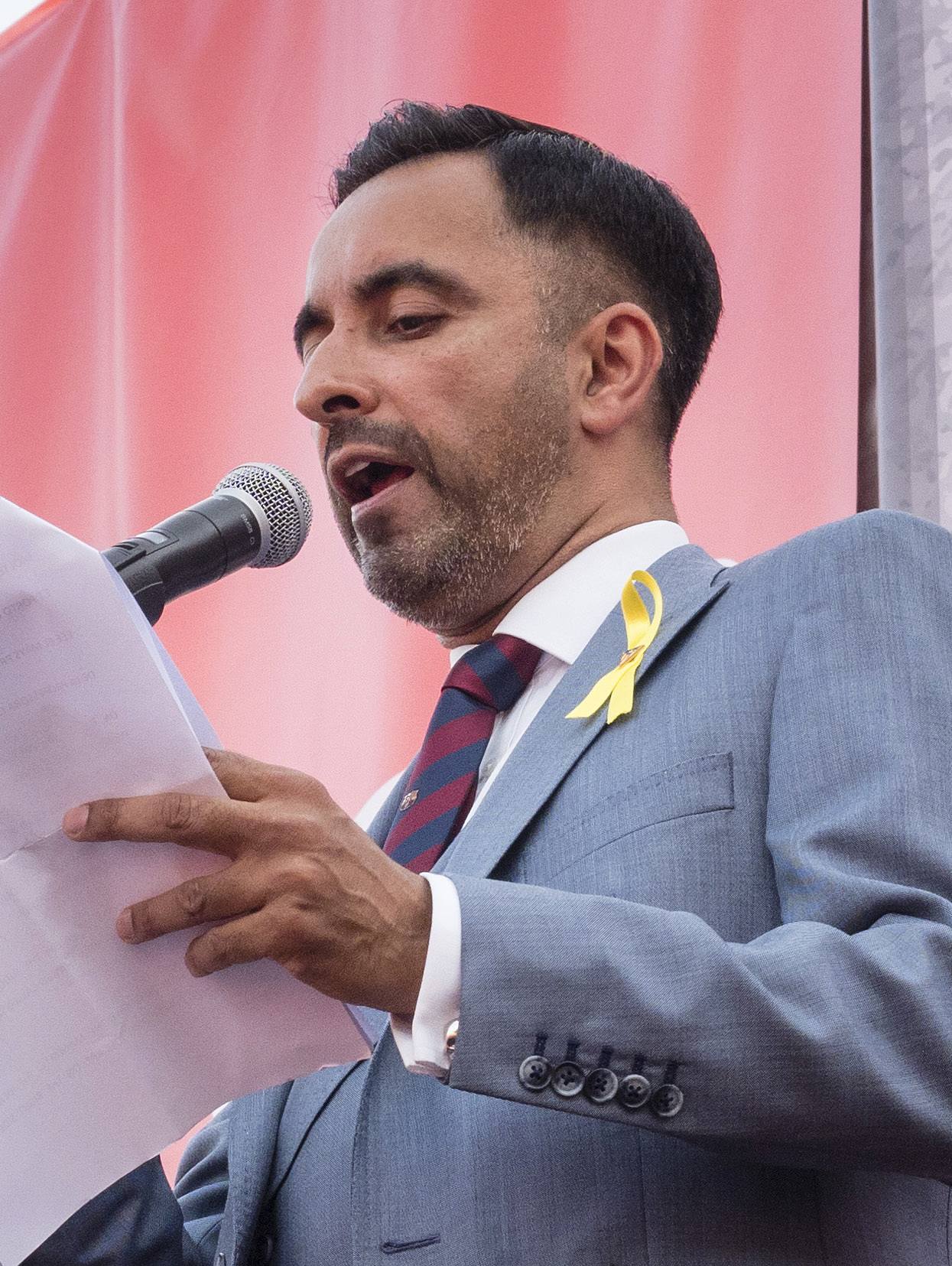
- Anwar in September 2018

Personal details
- Born: 30 December 1967 (age 58) Manchester, England
- Party: Scottish National Party (since 2015)
- Other political affiliations: Independent (until 2015)
- Children: 3
- Education: University of Glasgow; University of Strathclyde; University of Liverpool
- Occupation: Lawyer

Aamer Anwar (born 30 December 1967) is a British political activist and lawyer of Pakistani origin. He was an active participant in the Stop the War Coalition, and campaigned against the 31st G8 summit at Gleneagles. He has been a longstanding critic of the Dungavel Detention Centre for failed asylum seekers, and is a trustee of the Time for Inclusive Education charity for LGBT-inclusive education in Scottish schools.

== Early life ==
Anwar was born in Manchester, England to Pakistani parents on 30 December 1967 and lived in Liverpool before moving to Glasgow, Scotland, in 1986 to study mechanical engineering at the University of Glasgow to join the Royal Air Force. He became a student activist and led a campaign against alleged racism at the city's Dental Hospital, which helped introduce anonymous marking across all faculties at the university.

He left engineering to study sociology and politics and was still a student when he was arrested by police officers for illegally flyposting on Ashton Lane in 1991. During Anwar's arrest, he was pushed to the ground, and he took civil action against Strathclyde Police. In 1995, Sheriff Evans found that one officer had assaulted Anwar and that it appeared to be a racially motivated attack. Anwar was awarded £4,200 in compensation and the policeman was temporarily suspended. Anwar, however, found himself criticised by the ruling sheriff in regards to the release of "bloated confrontational material" surrounding the case, with the sheriff stating that the allegations of racism did not influence his findings. He became a solicitor in 2000, initially as part of a Glasgow-based partnership, before founding Aamer Anwar & Co, Solicitors & Notaries in 2006. He has a son and two daughters.

== Legal career ==
=== Surjit Singh Chhokar ===
Anwar came to prominence campaigning on behalf of the family of Surjit Singh Chhokar, a waiter who was murdered in November 1998 in Overtown, North Lanarkshire, Scotland. The case had some parallels to the murder of Stephen Lawrence in England, which led to a radical overhaul of the criminal justice system and several inquiries. The inquiries were boycotted by the Chhokar family as they were not public, and were considered by the family to be a "whitewash". The Jandoo Inquiry, which the family boycotted and refused to give evidence to, heavily criticised Anwar and said he took on too many roles and also took liberties in interpreting for the family. In the latter case, Anwar led the campaign on behalf of the Chhokar family. He also served on the Stephen Lawrence Steering Group, set up in 2000.

In 2003, Anwar acted as one of two solicitors for Allan Menzies, a 22-year-old man from Fauldhouse who murdered his friend after becoming obsessed with the film Queen of the Damned. The case centred heavily on conflicting psychiatric evidence regarding Menzies' sanity, with the defence asserting he suffered from schizophrenia. Following Menzies' conviction and life sentence, Anwar publicly critiqued the verdict and the legal system's approach to severe psychosis. He argued that the ability of a defendant to hide evidence or clear a crime scene should not automatically equate to mental wellness, stating that "the continued taboo and the lack of understanding or support of schizophrenia and mental health in our community can only mean that tragedies like this case are more likely to happen and not less." following his client's conviction.. After the suicide of Menzies in the segregation unit of HM Prison Shotts in 2004, Anwar represented the Menzies family at the subsequent Fatal Accident Inquiry (FAI) in 2006. The inquiry concluded with a sheriff ruling that the death could have been prevented had the Scottish Prison Service put a vulnerable prisoner monitoring process in place and obtained Menzies' prior psychiatric records. Anwar used the findings to campaign for better mental health protocols within the carceral system, believing that it was about time the prison service learnt their lessons so that such tragedies would not occur again.".

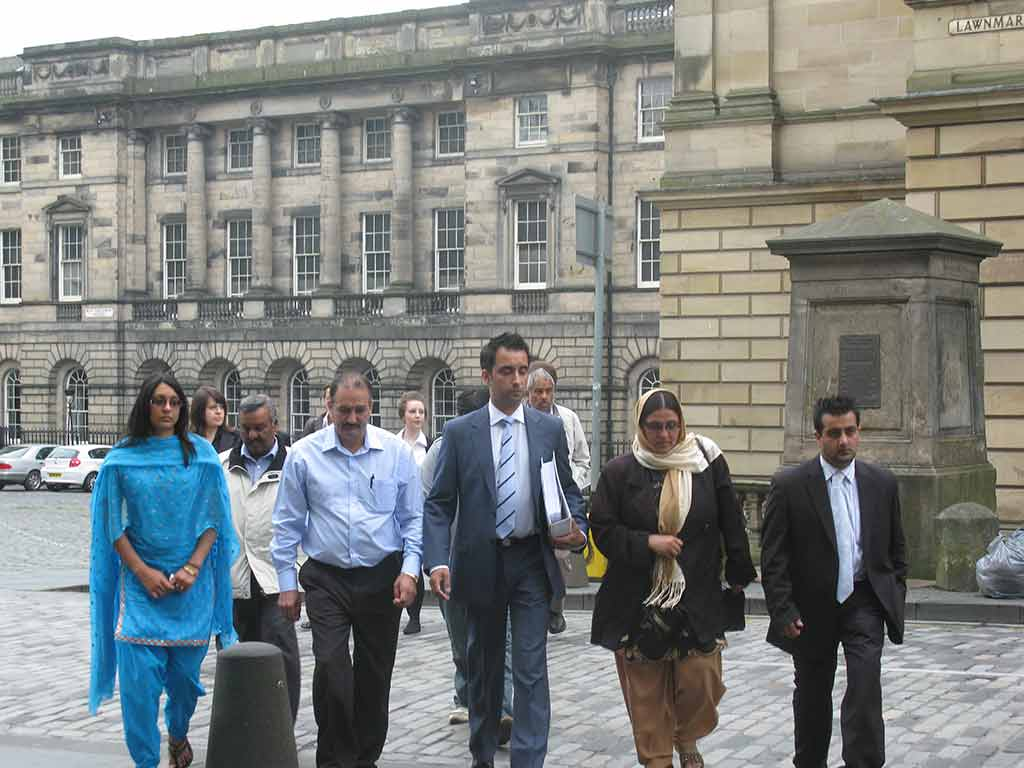
Anwar representing a family on an appeals case at the High Court of Justiciary, 2009

In 2012, following the reform of the double jeopardy law, he approached the Lord Advocate on behalf of the Chhokar family to request that the case be reopened and reinvestigated. On 2 May 2014, Anwar and the Chhokar family met with the Lord Advocate, who confirmed that the following reinvestigation by Police Scotland the Crown was seeking to have the original acquittals of three men set aside in an application to the Appeal Court for a retrial over the murder of Chhokar.

In October 2016, Ronnie Coulter was found guilty of the murder of Chhokar. Following the conviction, Police Scotland and the Lord Advocate acknowledged the role of campaigning by the Chhokar family and Anwar.

Following the sentencing of Ronnie Coulter to a life sentence, a Crown Office spokesman said:

The sentencing today for the murder of Surjit Singh Chhokar has finally delivered justice for the Chhokar family. The family has shown great courage and dignity throughout their long wait to see if someone is jailed for his killing. The family along with Aamer Anwar, campaigned tirelessly for improvements in the way allegations of racial crimes were dealt with and the justice system has transformed how it deals with racial crimes as a result.

=== "TC" Campbell ===
In 2004 Anwar was the solicitor for "TC" Campbell and successfully appealed to have Campbell's murder conviction overturned. Campbell had spent 20 years in jail for the arson and murder of a family, an incident that had been part of the Glasgow Ice Cream Wars.

=== Tommy Sheridan ===
In 2010 Anwar acted as solicitor for Tommy Sheridan in HM Advocate v Sheridan and Sheridan. Sheridan sacked Anwar after a dispute between the two men over Anwar's refusal to stop writing a column for a newspaper owned by Rupert Murdoch.

In July 2011, Anwar presented a dossier along with Tom Watson to Strathclyde Police into alleged criminality at the News of the World, allegations of phone hacking and data breaches, and police corruption as part of the wider News International phone hacking scandal. The dossier led to a full-scale police inquiry by Strathclyde Police termed Operation Rubicon and the subsequent arrest of Andy Coulson and Bob Bird, Scottish editor of News of the World.

=== Other ===
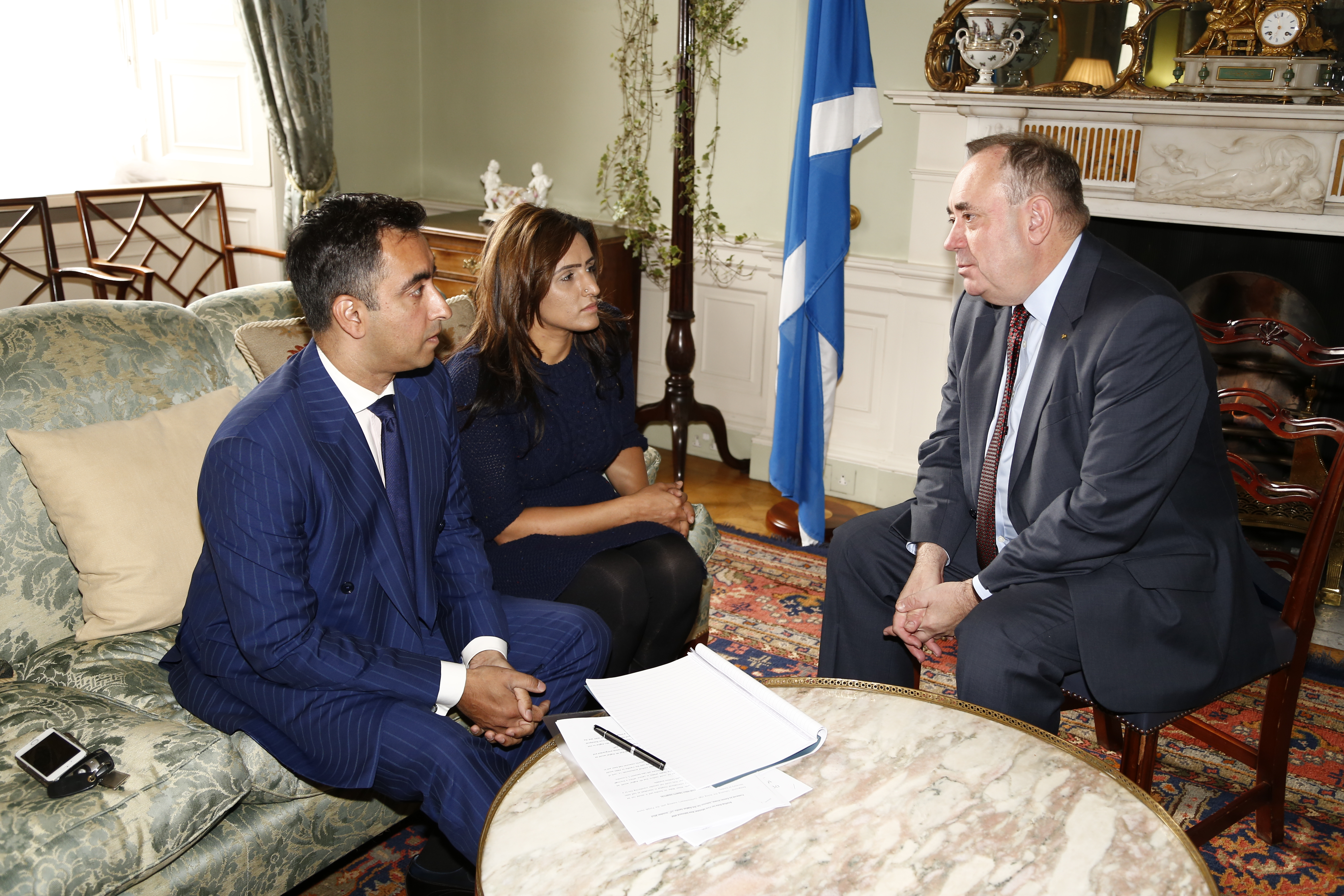
Anwar meeting with the first minister of Scotland, Alex Salmond, at Bute House, 2014

On 2 October 2012, Anwar gave evidence to the Scottish Parliament's Justice Committee arguing against allowing cameras in criminal trials. On 5 June 2014, it was announced that Anwar had lodged an appeal on behalf of the family of Abdelbaset Al-Megrahi, who was convicted of the bombing of Pan Am flight 103 in 1988 over Lockerbie. Al-Megrahi died from cancer following his compassionate release from prison while an application was being lodged with the Scottish Criminal Cases Review Commission, who sought to review his case and return it to the appeal court as a "miscarriage of justice". Anwar was also instructed by 24 British relatives of passengers who died on the flight, including Jim Swire.

In September 2014, Anwar represented the family of Jihadi bride Aqsa Mahmood, a 20-year-old woman from Glasgow who travelled to Syria to join the Islamic State of Iraq and the Levant. In 2017 he was instructed by the family of Sheku Bayoh. The family met the Lord Advocate, believing that PIRC's investigation had been fundamentally flawed.

In February 2017, Anwar represented the family of murder victim Emma Caldwell. He also represented two Scottish National Party MPs: Michelle Thomson and Natalie McGarry.

Anwar represented councillor Chris McEleny at his employment tribunal against the Ministry of Defence (MOD) in which he claimed he had been unfairly treated because of his views on independence. In August 2018, Judge Frances Eccles ruled that his support for Scottish independence met the definition of a "philosophical belief" under the Equality Act 2010 and should be protected from discrimination. Anwar described it as a "unprecedented legal landmark". The case was later dismissed in November 2019 due to a lack of evidence and the time taken to make his claim.

In 2021, Anwar represented Rangers F.C. player Glen Kamara, who claimed that he suffered from racial abuse by Slavia Prague player Ondrej Kudela in a Europa League Last-16 2nd leg game at Ibrox Stadium in March 2021. He was subjected to an increase in abuse and death threats following Kudela's ten-match ban.

== Rector of the University of Glasgow ==
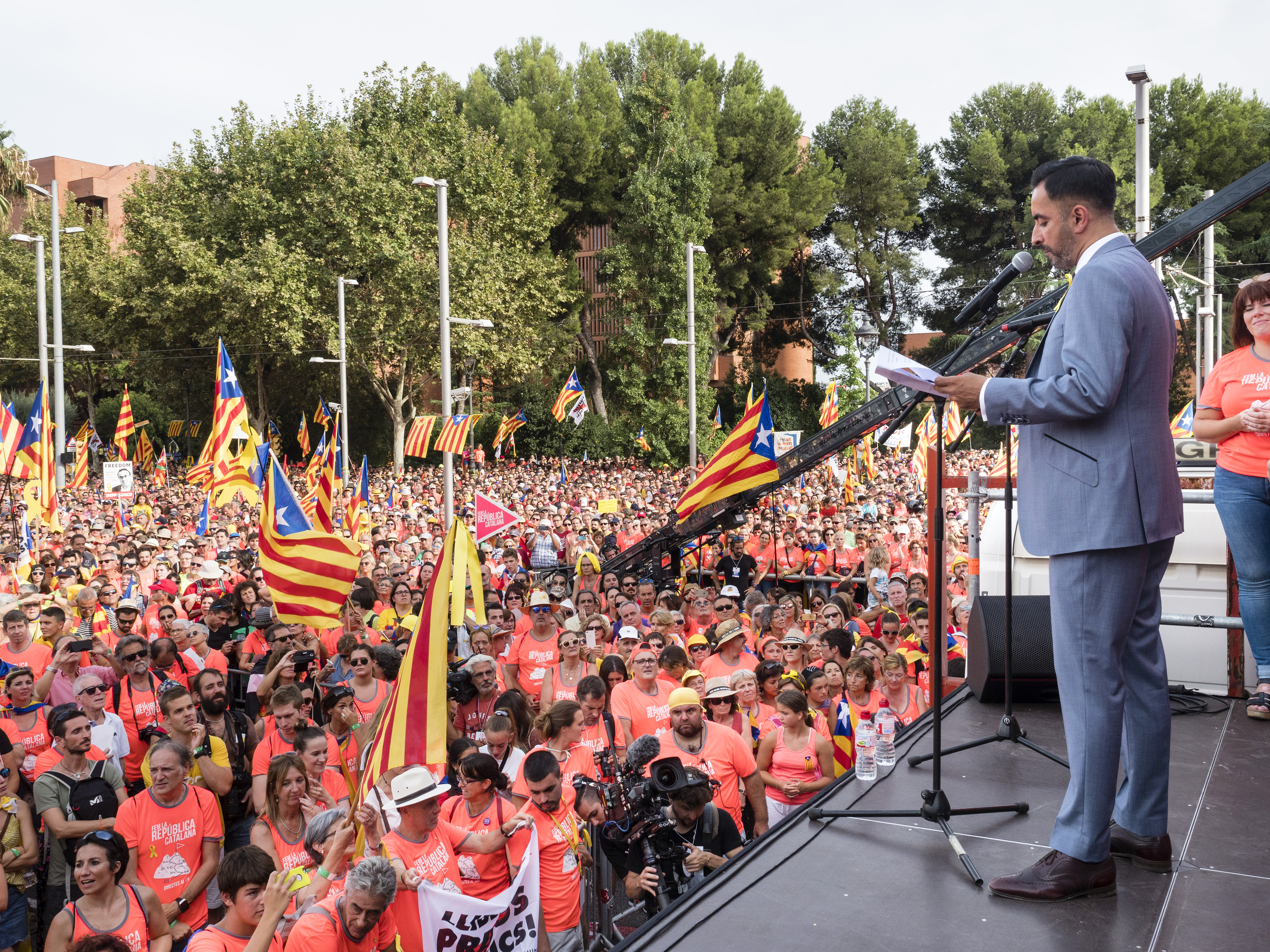
Anwar speaking to a pro-independence rally in Catalonia, 2018

In 2008, Anwar was runner-up in the election for Rector of the University of Glasgow and lost to Charles Kennedy. Edward Snowden followed Kennedy for a three-year term of office which finished in 2017, when Anwar was re-nominated for the role. On 21 March he was announced as having been elected by the students with over 54% of the vote (4,458). All the candidates were eliminated in the first round due to the "landslide" result in Anwar's favour. He took office on 31 March 2017 and was installed at a ceremony on 19 April 2017. The Times Scottish edition reported in June 2018 that Anwar had failed to hold a single surgery for the first 11 months of his rectorship, which was supported by Glasgow University.

Anwar has been criticised for publicly accusing the university of showing "callous disregard" for students and staff, treating international students as "cash cows" and claiming to have uncovered serious cases of racism and sexual harassment. However, officials at the university insisted that when they asked for specific details so they could launch investigations, none were provided. A report issued in 2021 detailed hundreds of incidents of racial abuse at the university.

== Controversies ==
Anwar made controversial statements in the aftermath of the 2007 Glasgow International Airport attack, in which he claimed "[t]hat there is no difference between a stealth bomber and a suicide bomber, the effects are still the same." In further remarks, he argued that there was a moral equivalence between the 9/11 hijackers and the United States when they bomb innocent civilians.

On 9 January 2008, Sheriff Charlotte Coutts described Anwar's evidence as "not credible" during a trial in which he claimed to be the victim of racial abuse. In 2008, he faced allegations of contempt of court in light of a complaint by the presiding judge in the case, Colin Sutherland, after Anwar directly attacked the jury following the trial and conviction of Mohammed Siddique in the High Court of Justiciary. Sutherland accused Anwar of making unprofessional, defamatory, and factually inaccurate attacks on the judiciary, the jury, and the wider legal process, stating that Anwar was "hiding behind the cloak of his client" to make politically motivated attacks on anti-terrorism legislation. Anwar was the first lawyer in the UK to be put on trial for contempt of court for comments he made on behalf of his client at the end of a trial. Iain Banks joined Labour politician Tony Benn, George Galloway, Bashir Maan, Gareth Peirce, and others to argue that such a prosecution was detrimental to free speech.

While finding Anwar's comments to be "misleading", Kenneth Osborne did not find him in contempt of court, but strongly criticised Anwar's behaviour, stating that statements from the lawyer were politically motivated and largely consisted of "angry and petulant criticism".

Following a full investigation by Law Scotland, Anwar was cleared of all charges of misconduct. In January 2010, he was successful in having one of Siddique's convictions overturned at the Court of Appeal; as a result Siddique was freed from prison but remains a convicted terrorist.

== Awards ==
Anwar was named Solicitor of the Year in the Herald's Law Awards of Scotland 2018. He was also named "Lawyer of the Year" at the fourteenth Scottish Legal Awards in March 2017, and "Solicitor of the Year" in the Herald's Law Awards of Scotland in November 2016. His firm picked up "Criminal Law Firm of the Year" at the Law Awards of Scotland in 2006 and 2014.

At the Lloyds TSB Jewel Awards in 2007, he received the Professional Excellence Award as a "recognition of his outstanding achievements and the huge impact his work has had UK wide". In December 2007 the law magazine The Firm placed him ninth in a feature of top 100 most powerful and influential people in the Scottish justice system and legal profession. In January 2013, he was nominated for the Services to Law award at the British Muslim Awards. In 2014 he was awarded the Scottish Muslim Award—Al Adl Ihsan for Public Services.

Academic offices
Preceded by Edward Snowden	Rector of the University of Glasgow; 2017–2020	Succeeded by Rita Rae, Lady Rae
