= Operation Rubicon (police investigation) =

Scottish phone hacking investigation

Operation Rubicon was a Scottish police investigation into allegations of phone hacking, breach of data protection and perjury.

The operation was initiated by a complaint from Tommy Sheridan's family solicitor, Aamer Anwar, including allegations of perjury, phone hacking and breach of data protection.

The operation was a major investigation, led by Detective Superintendent John McSporran. The Herald has reported that 50 officers are assigned to the case

The investigation detained Andy Coulson on 30 May 2012 and charged him with perjury.

On 3 June 2015, Coulson was formally acquitted after a judge dismissed the case against him. All other cases investigated by Operation Rubicon were dropped without coming to trial.

== Background ==
On 16 December 2007, Sheridan was charged with perjury following a defamation case against the News of the World. On 23 December 2010, a jury found him guilty of perjury and on 26 January 2011 he was sentenced to 3 years in prison.

== See also ==
- Tommy Sheridan
- HM Advocate v Sheridan and Sheridan
- Operation Weeting
- Operation Elveden
- Operation Tuleta
- Operation Motorman (ICO investigation)
- Metropolitan police role in phone hacking scandal
- News media phone hacking scandal
- Phone hacking scandal reference lists
