= Paddy Christie (journalist) =

Scottish journalist

Paddy Christie (born c. 1945) is a Scottish journalist. She originally comes from Stonehaven

She initially worked on the Aberdeen Evening Express.

She then worked as a reporter for BBC Scotland's news programme Reporting Scotland. She then moved to Scottish Television and reported for Scotland Today.

She was in a relationship with Donald Findlay, a leading Scottish lawyer, from roughly 1994 to 1999. They first met some years earlier during her time as a court reporter. Towards the end of their relationship she was bothered by nuisance calls from a former colleague of Findlay.
