= Mohammed Atif Siddique =

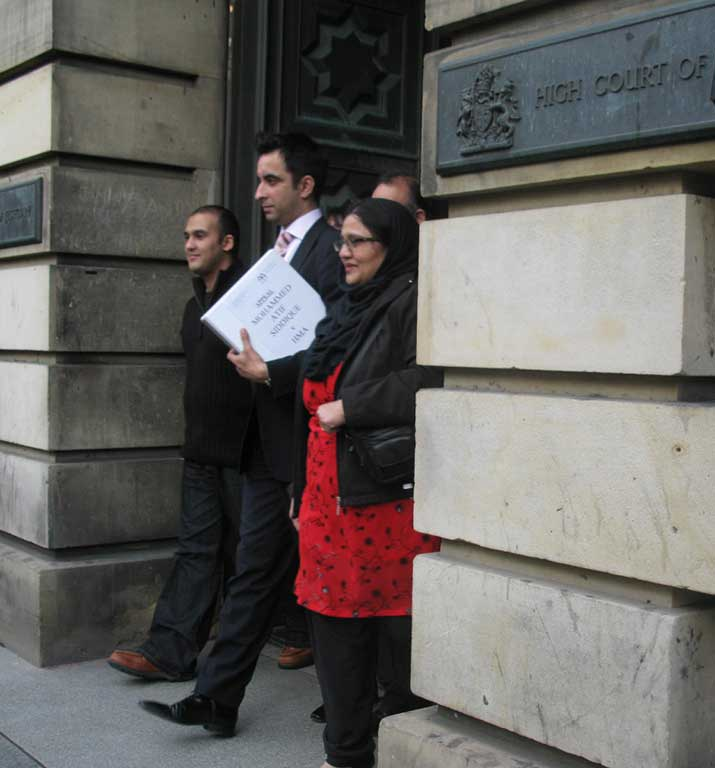
Atif Sidique wins his appeal at the High Court in Edinburgh and walks free 9 February 2010

Mohammed Atif Siddique is a Scottish prisoner who was found guilty, but later cleared on appeal, of one of his convictions "collecting terrorist-related information, setting up websites...and circulating inflammatory terrorist publications", resulting in a sentence of eight years' imprisonment. His defence has consistently been that he was a curious 20-year-old youth, still living with his parents, who was "looking for answers on the internet". One of his convictions was quashed on appeal on 29 January 2010. He remains a convicted terrorist.

BBC programme maker Peter Taylor reported in his acclaimed three part series "Generation Jihad" that Siddique was linked to extremist Abid Khan, who was later imprisoned for Terrorist offences also.

Siddique's parents, of South Asian descent, run a general store in Alva, Clackmannanshire which their son believed should stop serving alcohol as an off-licence. Arguments with his parents led to his running away from home once, before returning.

Siddique attended Alva Academy where he was a "model student", before enrolling as a Computing Technician student at Glasgow Metropolitan College.

== Arrests ==
On April 12, 2006, Siddique was accompanying his 40-year-old paternal uncle Mohammed Rafiq on a trip to his farm in the Punjab region, when officials at Glasgow International Airport informed the pair that they would not be allowed to fly. The laptop computer that Siddique was carrying was confiscated, and agents DC Murray and Leigh Graham opened the computers files, against police protocol. His cell phone was also seized, after a photograph of Islamic protestors of the Jyllands-Posten Muhammad cartoons was discovered. It was alleged he was flying to meet Aabid Khan, a friend of one of the Toronto 18, and thus may have been plotting to involve himself with the group.

At 7 am the following morning, local police officers, MI5 and Special Branch stormed the Siddique house with a battering ram, arresting Siddique, his older brother Asif, their uncles Rafiq and Mohammed Niaz, 46 - the latter of whom was a 26-year resident of Stirlingshire.

The uncles were released from Govan police station after thirteen days imprisonment. Siddique was charged the next day under Section 58(1b) of the Terrorism Act 2000, collecting information that would "likely be useful" to a terrorist.

Asif, who was a 25-year-old law student, was released the day after Siddique's charges were laid, after he was questioned about his feelings towards the September 11th attacks after police found postcards sent from friends he maintained in New York City.

== Trial ==
During the four-week trial under judge Lord Carloway, Siddique was accused of having shown photographs of suicide bombers to students at Glasgow Metropolitan College, classmate Kyle Ramsey stated that Siddique had encouraged him to watch an online video of a beheading, and classmate Fozia Begum testified that he had claimed Osama bin Laden was his god, and he was a member of al-Qaeda.

He was also accused of carrying on email correspondence with a suspected militant identified only as "The Englishman" in court proceedings. The emails had been discovered after Canadian authorities requested Britain monitor a suspected militant recruiter living in Northern England.

The advocate depute was Brian McConnachie, who characterized the material stating "It's clear from that material that the whole idea was to glorify martyrdom operations..."

In June, Evan Kohlmann was given access to the contents of Siddique's laptop by the Central Scotland Police, and he submit an 18-page summary stating that the images, documents and videos that Siddique had downloaded comprised "a formidable archive of authentic Al-Qaida recruitment and technical material that is designed and likely to be used for purposes relating to the commission, perpetration, or instigation of an act of terrorism—most specifically, a suicide or 'martyrdom' operation". Forensic analyst Michael Dickson also argued that because the majority of files were kept in the c:\windows\options folder, it showed a clear intent to "hide" his interest.

The trial concluded with nine hours of deliberation by the jury of nine women and six men, resulting in a Guilty verdict on September 27, 2007.

After the conviction, Kohlmann said that Siddique "apparently lacked in the skills, sophistication, lengthy credentials, and cold-blooded professionalism" associated with actual terrorists and described him as "undoubtedly naive".

After the trial ended, the prosecution alleged that it had been his intention to disappear once in Pakistan to join a Toronto-based group arrested on allegations of wanting to bomb Canadian targets, though his counsel pointed out that no evidence was ever produced to support the allegation, and referred to it as a "smear".

Following the trial, Lord Carloway announced he intended to seek contempt of court charges against Siddique's solicitor Aamer Anwar for making "disparaging remarks" about the outcome of the trial, referring to an "atmosphere of hostility". Siddique's leading counsel was Donald Findlay.

== Appeal ==
On 29 January 2010, one of the charges against Siddique was overturned on appeal. The appeal judge, Lord Osborne, stated that some directions given to the jury by the trial judge, Lord Carloway, were a "material misdirection" and amounted to a "miscarriage of justice".

The Crown Office issued a statement on 9 February 2010 indicating that it had decided not to seek a retrial of Mohammed Atif Siddique on terrorism charges following the Criminal Appeal Court's decision two weeks ago to quash a conviction under section 57 of the Terrorism Act 2000, on the basis that the trial judge misdirected the jury as to the relevant law.

The statement continues as follows:

“The law in relation to section 57 of Terrorism Act 2000 has, since the trial judge charged the jury, further developed through a number of decisions in the English courts.

“After careful consideration of the Appeal Court’s judgment, the Crown has decided not to seek authority for a retrial. The fact that Mr Siddique has already served the majority of his sentence for charge 1, and has de facto served his sentence in full for the other terrorist offences, of which he remains convicted, means that a retrial would have little practical effect. Accordingly, the Crown has concluded that a retrial would not be in the public interest.

"Mohammed Atif Siddique remains convicted of the other charges on the indictment which were:

- section 54 of the Terrorism Act 2000: setting up websites providing links to documents providing instructions on how to operate weaponry and make explosives
- section 2 of the Terrorism Act 2006: circulating terrorist publications by means of websites to encourage, induce or assist the commission, preparation or instigation of acts of terrorism)
- breach of the peace: showing images of suicide bombers, murders and beheadings to fellow students, threatening to be a suicide bomber and to carry out terrorism in Glasgow or elsewhere."
