= Sheridan v News Group Newspapers Ltd =

UK legal case

Sheridan v News Group Newspapers (Thomas Sheridan v News Group Newspapers Ltd) is a civil court case brought by Tommy Sheridan against the publishers of the News of the World, which began in the Court of Session in Edinburgh, Scotland, on 4 July 2006. He alleged that the News of the World defamed his character through a series of articles in their publication.

Although Sheridan's case was upheld, he was later prosecuted for perjury for lies that he told the court and was subsequently convicted in HM Advocate v Sheridan and Sheridan.

== Background ==
Tommy Sheridan was a leading figure in the negotiations to establish the Scottish Socialist Alliance in 1996, which evolved into the Scottish Socialist Party (SSP) in 1998. He was elected to the Scottish Parliament in 1999 as a Glasgow representative of the SSP which he remained until he broke with the SSP in the aftermath of the court case to form Solidarity.

He was the convenor of the SSP from its formation until 11 November 2004 when he was asked to resign from this post, by a unanimous vote of the Executive Committee (EC) of the SSP.

He later claimed to have resigned due to 'personal reasons' citing a desire to spend more time with his family. At the time of his announcement, his wife Gail was expecting their first child, and this was the reason Sheridan cited as being his primary motivation for resigning:

"I cannot continue to be the party convener and be a proper father. We are entering uncharted waters, Gail and I. We are older parents, and we are excited but petrified. Since the announcement of Gail's pregnancy, it has focused my mind completely. We have been discussing this for some weeks."

After this announcement, the News of the World ran a series of articles, alleging that he had committed adultery. Sheridan strenuously denied the accusations and quickly announced his intention to sue. The EC of the Scottish Socialist Party requested that he pursue a political rather than legal response to the allegations and declined to publicly back his court case.

As part of their defence, the News of the World demanded that the Scottish Socialist Party hand over all documents related to the executive meeting immediately prior to Tommy Sheridan's resignation. The executive Committee of the party declined and publicly requested that Sheridan abandon his court case. In refusing to hand over the documents, party policy co-ordinator Alan McCombes was found in contempt of court and jailed for 12 days, while the SSP offices and McCombes' private home were raided by messengers-at-arms.

A stormy meeting of the SSP National Council fairly narrowly defeated a motion from the EC to continue refusing to hand over the minutes to the court, effectively supporting a request by Sheridan that they should be handed over. It also voted to give him "full political support" in his defamation action.

== The trial ==
=== Pursuer's case ===
On 14 July an incident occurred during the presentation of the pursuer's case. Graeme Henderson, junior counsel for the pursuer, suggested to witness Ann Colvin that she had a conviction for credit card fraud. This was untrue, which led to the presiding judge warning Henderson that he had broken the Faculty of Advocates' code of conduct. As a result of the incident, Sheridan dismissed his legal team and represented himself thereafter.

On 28 July, the News of the World editor, in evidence, confessed that the newspaper had changed parts of their story. This followed earlier evidence where the newspaper's journalist Anvar Khan admitted that parts of her story had been sensationalised to help sell her book. She altered her story admitting that the alcohol, drugs and spanking had been added.

National Union of Journalists' Scottish Organiser Paul Holleran admitted advising both Anvar Khan and Tommy Sheridan, both of whom were NUJ members on opposing sides during the case, though only Khan was primarily a journalist. Under questioning, Holleran admitted to having passed on details of confidential discussions with Ms Khan - also an NUJ member - to Sheridan to assist Sheridan's case against the News of the World.

Six witnesses who had been at the crucial meeting were also called to support Sheridan's claim that the minute was not accurate in that he had denied visiting the swingers' club, rather than confessing as had been recorded.

=== Defender's case ===
The jury heard allegations that Sheridan had visited "swingers'" clubs in Sheffield and Manchester and had engaged in an adulterous affair with another woman. Sheridan, who claims to be teetotal, was also alleged to have drunk champagne during an extramarital liaison. Sheridan denied these allegations.

Allison Kane, SSP Treasurer, alleged in Court that Sheridan had admitted to a party meeting that the allegations concerning his private life were true, but that the newspaper would be unable to prove them. She told the Court that the controversial minute which the party had sought to withhold had noted this. Alan McCombes, the SSP official who had previously been jailed for refusing to hand over minutes of a party meeting when required to do so as part of this litigation, told the Court that Sheridan had admitted to him that he had visited swingers clubs. According to the testimony of 11 SSP members who were at the meeting, including Colin Fox, Carolyn Leckie, Allan Green, Rosie Kane, Catriona Grant, Keith Baldassara, Jo Harvie and Barbara Scott, Sheridan admitted to a meeting of the SSP executive that he had visited Cupids in Manchester.

Anvar Khan testified in court that, as well as having sex with Sheridan while he was married, she witnessed Sheridan engaging in group sex with Katrine Trolle, an SSP candidate in 2003, and Sheridan's brother-in-law. Trolle later testified that these allegations were true and that she had visited Cupid's swingers' club with Sheridan and his wife's sister's husband, where they indulged in group sex. Two of Trolle's friends also testified that they had met Sheridan in the home they shared with Trolle, and saw Sheridan go upstairs to her bedroom with her.

Two other women claimed to have seen Sheridan engaging in group sex in a Glasgow hotel on another occasion. One of these witnesses claimed to have been threatened by someone allegedly trying to protect Sheridan. These witnesses had attempted to sell their stories.

In total, 18 witnesses testified that they had either had sexual relations with Sheridan while he was married, witnessed him taking part in sex sessions or had heard him admit to visiting a swingers' club.

=== The judge's summation ===
On 4 August 2006, the judge commented in the course of his summing up that, due to the nature of the conflicting witness evidence, it may be necessary to investigate after conclusion of the case whether criminal charges should be brought against any witnesses for perjury.

=== The verdict ===
Later that day, the jury of six men and five women decided by a seven-four majority and after three hours deliberation that Tommy Sheridan had been defamed. The News of the World was ordered to pay damages of £200,000. However, this was not paid to Sheridan, as the News of the World's editor Bob Bird immediately announced the newspaper intended to appeal the verdict on the basis that it implied "eighteen independent witnesses came to this court and committed monstrous acts of perjury".

== Aftermath ==
=== Perjury investigation and trial ===
In August 2006, Charlie McCarthy, an SSP spokesperson and former candidate, distributed to a number of newspapers an account of a meeting he claimed to have had with Tommy Sheridan where Sheridan allegedly made a number of comments about his personal life at variance with the evidence he gave in the court case. A number of other activists also came forward to claim that Sheridan had held similar meetings with them, in particular allegedly admitting that he had affairs and attended sex clubs. In October 2006, the News of the World released a videotape which allegedly taped Sheridan confessing to attending the club and admitting such to the SSP National Executive.

On 2 October 2006, the Procurator Fiscal decided that there were grounds for an investigation into perjury, and instructed Lothian and Borders Police to proceed with one. On 21 February 2007, The Herald reported that the Crown Office had asked Lothian and Borders Police to undertake a full inquiry after receiving a preliminary report, which was scaled up in May 2006, with the number of officers assigned to the case doubling to 20.

On 19 October 2006, it was reported that the police had interviewed a member of the SSP and were intending to seize computing equipment that had been used to type the minutes of party meetings. Further details regarding the progress of the investigation were reported in The Scotsman and the Sunday Herald during March–April 2007, suggesting that Lothian and Borders Police were investigating the evidence of several of the key witnesses in the case, and had reached a conclusion with respect to the disputed minute.

On 16 December 2007 Tommy Sheridan was charged with perjury. During February 2008 six more people were charged with perjury; they were Graeme McIver, Jock Penman, Pat Smith and Rosemary Byrne (all members of Sheridan's new party Solidarity who had been at the disputed SSP EC meeting of November 2004) plus Sheridan's wife, Gail and her father, Angus Healy.

It was estimated that the costs of this investigation could reach £500,000, although it is unclear how this compares with similar investigations into perjury allegations against less well known individuals. Sheridan has previously stated "the streets of Lothian must be crime-free if the police can devote time to harassing a family", following the charging of two with perjury, not to mention five others who "are my friends".

The trial of Tommy and Gail Sheridan started on 4 October 2010 at the Glasgow High Court, before Lord Bracadale, with a jury of thirteen women and two men. It concluded on 23 December. All charges against Gail Sheridan had been dropped on 17 December while Tommy Sheridan was found guilty of five of the original twelve perjury charges.

=== News of the World appeal ===
On 11 August 2006 the News of the World had lodged an appeal with the Court of Session in Edinburgh and on 13 February 2007 reported that a provisional date for the appeal hearing had been set in December 2007. On 25 September 2007 the appeal was suspended at the request of the News of the World until the inquiry into allegations of perjury is concluded.

=== Allegations of witness intimidation ===
On 15 August 2006, Lord Turnbull wrote to the Faculty of Advocates about an allegation that Anne Colvin, a witness in the case, had a criminal record. and on 4 January 2007 The Herald reported the victim of this allegation was refused permission by Sheridan to the results of the Law Society's investigation into the matter.

On 10 October 2006, BBC News reported that Grampian police were investigating a claim by Fiona McGuire, who had been a witness in the trial for the News of the World, that she had received a death threat through the post. In a statement to the BBC, Mr Sheridan said: "I utterly condemn any threats to Fiona McGuire or any other individual". Helen Allison, a witness in the case, told police that she had been lured to a meeting where she was pressed not to give evidence. The police have investigated staff at the sex club allegedly being offered bribes not to cooperate with the police inquiry into the court case.

As of 2014 no formal action has been taken over these allegations.

=== Appeal against Sheridan's defamation award (2016) ===
An appeal hearing at the Court of Session in Edinburgh against the 2006 defamation award in light of Sheridan's later perjury conviction began on 10 May 2016. Sheridan has continued to maintain his innocence in the perjury case, and to reject the allegations made against him, while counsel for the newspaper group wanted the verdict of the jury in 2006 to be "struck down". The three judges in their written summary said that the jury had valid reasons for reaching their verdict that the News of the World had defamed Sheridan, even though they may have concluded that he had lied in court about "several matters". New Group Newspapers (now part of News UK) lost their appeal against the award of £200,000 damages to Sheridan on 19 August 2016.

== See also ==
- News of the World phone hacking affair
