= Mamoun Fandy =

Egyptian-American scholar

Mamoun Fandy is an Egyptian-born American scholar. He is president of the London Global Strategy Institute, and a former senior fellow at the Baker Institute, the United States Institute of Peace, and at the International Institute for Strategic Studies in London. Before that Fandy was a research professor of politics at the Center for Contemporary Arab Studies at the School of Foreign Service of Georgetown University, as well as of Arab politics at the National Defense University. He is frequently seen on American television, and is a columnist for Al-Ahram and the Asharq Al-Awsat.

In his 2007 book (Un)Civil War of Words: Media and Politics in the Arab World, Fandy called Al Jazeera the "Muslim Brotherhood channel", accusing the network of glorifying Muslim Brotherhood founder Hassan Al-Bannah in a two-part documentary in 2006.

He is currently living in London with his wife and two children.

== Books ==
- 2001 Saudi Arabia and the Politics of Dissent (hardcover ISBN 0-312-21021-3; paperback ISBN 0-312-23882-7)
- 2004 The Road to Kandahar: On the Trail of bin Laden and Zawaheri
- 2007 (Un)Civil War of Words: Media and Politics in the Arab World (ISBN 0275993930)
- 2009 Kuwait and a New Concept of International Politics
