= HM Advocate v Sheridan and Sheridan =

2010 criminal case in Scotland

- Court: High Court of Justiciary
- Full case name: Her Majesty's Advocate v Thomas Sheridan and Gail Sheridan
- Decided: 23 December 2010

Case history
- Related action: Sheridan v News Group Newspapers

Court membership
- Judge sitting: Lord Bracadale

Her Majesty's Advocate v Thomas Sheridan and Gail Sheridan was the 2010 criminal prosecution of Tommy Sheridan, a former Member of the Scottish Parliament and his wife Gail Sheridan for perjury in relation to an earlier civil case called Sheridan v News Group Newspapers. (Note: In Scotland criminal prosecutions in the High Court are normally brought in the name of the Lord Advocate.) Tommy Sheridan was found guilty and sentenced to three years in prison, whereas Gail was acquitted.

== Background ==
In 2006, Tommy Sheridan, formerly convenor of the Scottish Socialist Party (SSP), successfully sued the newspaper News of the World for defamation after it printed a series of articles containing allegations that an MSP had had affairs and visited a sex club. Sheridan was awarded £200,000 in damages, which he has still not received pending an appeal. Controversy over the case led to a split in the SSP shortly afterwards, with Sheridan forming a breakaway party, Solidarity.

In August 2006, a group of SSP activists claimed claim that during meetings Sheridan had with them, he made admissions inconsistent with his evidence in the court case, in particular admitting that he had affairs and visited a swingers' club in Manchester. In October 2006, the News of the World released a videotape which showed Sheridan admitting that he had visited the club, and admitting that he had admitted this to the SSP Executive.

On 2 October 2006, the Procurator Fiscal decided that there were grounds for an investigation into perjury, and instructed Lothian and Borders Police to proceed. In February 2007, the Crown Office asked Lothian and Borders Police undertake a full inquiry after receiving a preliminary report, which was scaled up in May 2007, with the number of officers assigned to the case doubling to 20.

During late 2006 and early 2007, the police interviewed several SSP members and other witnesses, and seized computers.

In December 2007, Tommy Sheridan was charged with perjury, and by February six more people were also charged: Graeme McIver, John Penman, Pat Smith and Rosemary Byrne (all members of Sheridan's new party Solidarity who had been at the disputed SSP executive meeting of November 2004) plus Sheridan's wife, Gail and her father, Angus Healy.

== The trial ==
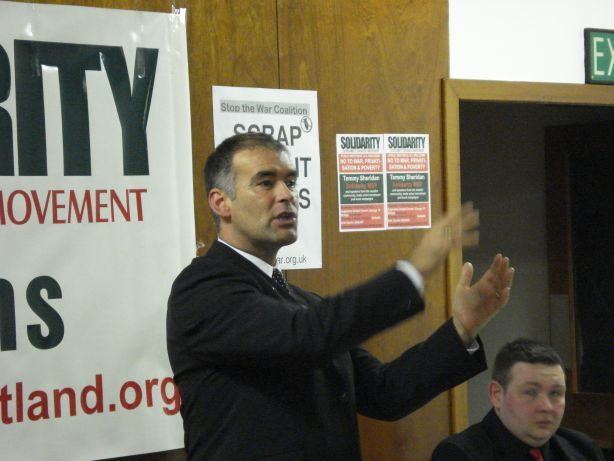
Tommy Sheridan

=== Preliminary hearings ===
At a preliminary hearing at the High Court in Edinburgh on 13 July 2009, the indictment against Tommy and Gail Sheridan was made public. Both were charged with perjury in relation to several issues at the civil trial, and Tommy Sheridan was also charged with subornation of perjury by allegedly attempting to persuade Colin Fox to commit perjury at this trial.

Both accused took pleas in bar of trial on the basis of prejudicial pre-trial publicity, and sought to raise devolution minutes. At a preliminary hearing at the High Court in Edinburgh between 28 and 30 July 2010, the trial judge Lord Bracadale, heard legal arguments on these matters. At the close of the hearing, the preliminary pleas were repelled and the devolution minutes refused. Due to the high-profile nature of the case, Lord Bracadale took the somewhat unusual step of issuing a note, setting forth his reasons for repelling the preliminary pleas and detailing his directions given to the jury with respect to media publicity.

=== Representation ===
The prosecution was led by Alex Prentice QC, his junior was David Nicolson.

Initially, Sheridan hired Donald Findlay QC to defend him, but he later dropped him in favour of Margaret Scott QC, who represented Abdelbaset al-Megrahi in an appeal against his conviction for the Lockerbie bombing. Junior counsel for Sheridan was Shelagh McCall. Gail was represented by Paul McBride QC and Billy Lavelle. Her solicitor was John Paul Mowbray.

On 11 October it was announced that Sheridan had dismissed Margaret Scott, and would conduct his own defence. He retained his solicitor Aamer Anwar, who the judge appointed as amicus curiae.

The full trial started on 4 October 2010 at the Glasgow High Court before Lord Bracadale, with a jury of 13 women and 2 men, mostly younger women with one ethnic minority juror. (Note: Criminal trials in Scotland have a jury of 15, at that time with verdicts by simple majority, see Trial by jury in Scotland.) On 15 December the judge excused one of the women jurors from serving further; the trial continued with 14 jurors.

On 25 November and again on 2 and 20 December the prosecution removed a number of charges from the indictment.

=== Prosecution case ===
An important issue was the crucial SSP executive meeting of 9 November 2004, where Sheridan resigned as convenor. 16 witnesses who were present claimed that he did admit to visiting Cupids sex club in Manchester at this meeting. Barbara Scott, the minute secretary, claimed that the minutes and her notes support this claim.

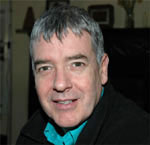
Alan McCombes

An important piece of evidence was a tape which was filmed secretly a few days after this meeting, showing Sheridan making a "foul-mouthed tirade" containing statements inconsistent with his evidence in the civil trial. Under cross-examination Alan McCombes denied scripting the video, as alleged by Sheridan. Bob Bird, Scottish editor of the News of the World, gave evidence about how the paper acquired the tape. (Note: A full transcript of this tape was published in the News of the World on 26 December 2010.) While giving evidence, Bird said that emails relating to Sheridan may have been lost. The next day Tom Watson MP contacted the Information Commissioner, asking him to investigate whether the News of the World was in breach of the Data Protection Act.

Katrine Trolle, a Danish woman who was the SSP candidate in Aberdeen North in the 2003 Scottish Parliament election, claimed that she had had an affair with Sheridan (on one occasion in the bedroom in his home in Glasgow) and visited Cupids sex club with him on 27 September 2002. This was supported by a former housemate of Trolle and her ex-boyfriend who claimed that Sheridan spent the night with Trolle at her home in Dundee. Gary Clark, a former professional footballer and childhood friend of Sheridan, claimed to have visited a club in Manchester with Sheridan which showed pornographic videos. Anvar Khan, a News of the World journalist, claimed that she had visited Cupids sex club with Sheridan and had an affair with him. This was supported by a former neighbour of Khan, who claimed to have seen Khan and Sheridan appear from the direction of a bedroom. A former worker in Cupids and another witness claimed to have seen Sheridan in Cupids. A number of SSP activists also claimed that in the course of discussions Sheridan had made admissions about his personal life inconsistent with his evidence in the civil trial.

The final chapter of the prosecution case involved a sex party which Sheridan allegedly attended at the Moat House Hotel in Glasgow. All charges related to this matter were dropped following Crown witness Matt McColl's testimony and cross examination. During his appearance in court he was warned for contempt of court due to his reluctance to name his then girlfriend and now wife, as well as agreeing he had previously told police that Sheridan had not been at the Moat House.

On 2 December the prosecution completed its case. It dropped the charge of subornation of perjury on the grounds of lack of corroboration, and some points from the charges of perjury against both Sheridans.

=== Defence case ===
The defence opened its case on 3 December. Both Sheridans declined to act as witnesses themselves. Many of the witnesses called by Sheridan were members of Solidarity, his own party, including Hugh Kerr, Rosemary Byrne and Mike Gonzalez. He also called Andy Coulson, Downing Street director of communications and former News of the World editor, who denied that he had any knowledge of phone hacking at the News of the World, or that he knew Glenn Mulcaire, the private detective at the centre of controversy. Tom Watson had briefed Sheridan's team about alleged phone hacking a few days earlier.

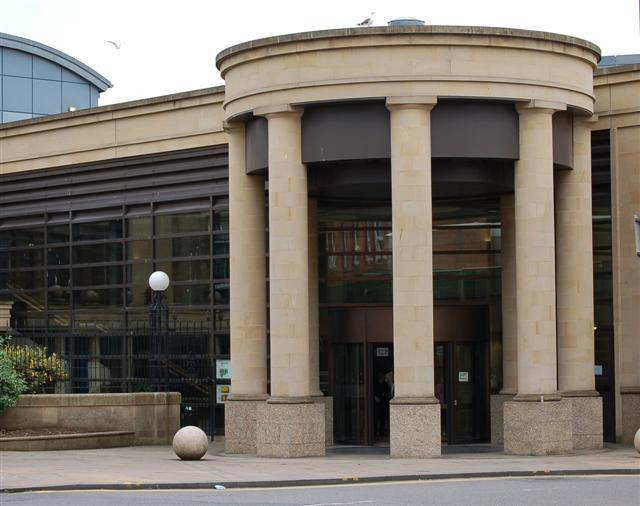
Glasgow High Court, where the trial took place

Four witnesses who were present at the crucial SSP executive meeting of 9 November 2004 claimed that Sheridan did not admit to visiting a sex club at the meeting.

On 17 December the defence case completed. The prosecution then dropped the last remaining charge against Gail Sheridan, who was acquitted by the judge. Later that day her solicitor made a statement on her behalf outside the court thanking her legal team.

=== Summations ===
Alex Prentice gave his closing speech on 20 December. Sheridan gave his closing speech on 21–22 December, Lord Bracadale gave his summing-up, the jury then retired to consider their verdict and were later sent home for the night.

=== Verdict ===
On 23 December the jury found Sheridan guilty of five of six perjury charges, acquitting him of the perjury charge related to his alleged affair with Anvar Khan. He was bailed pending background reports.

On 26 January he was sentenced to three years in prison. On both days Gail Sheridan made a statement outside the court saying that she was standing by her husband.

Sheridan was released on licence on 30 January 2012, having served just over one year of his sentence.

== Aftermath ==
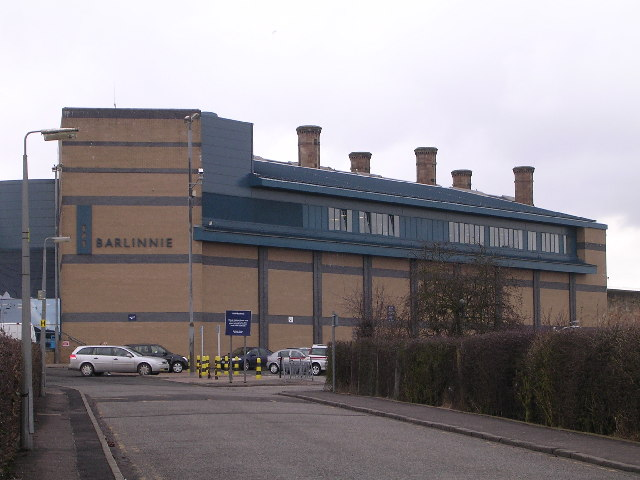
HM Prison Barlinnie, where Sheridan began his sentence

After the trial, the Crown Office issued a statement saying that no further action would be taken against six other people charged with perjury in relation to the civil trial, five of whom were Sheridan's associates (see above).

BBC Scotland broadcast a radio drama based on the trial, with Gavin Mitchell as Tommy Sheridan, Karen Dunbar as Gail, and Julie Wilson Nimmo as Katrine Trolle.

On 24 December 2010, Tommy Sheridan lodged an intimation of intention to appeal against his conviction. In June 2011, leave to appeal was refused by a single judge at the first sift. This decision was appealed to a bench of three judges. In August 2011, leave to appeal was refused at the second sift

In the light of the News of the World phone hacking affair, the Crown Office instructed the Strathclyde Police to reassess the evidence. However Paul McBride stated that he did not believe that this affair had any bearing on Sheridan's conviction.

A complaint submitted to Strathclyde Police in July 2011 led to Operation Rubicon, a major investigation involving 50 officers investigating allegations of phone hacking, breach of data protection and perjury by News of the World.

Alex Prentice has continued his legal career, twice winning a murder conviction without a body in 2012. Paul McBride died suddenly in early 2012. A few people involved in the case were candidates in the 2012 Glasgow City Council election: Gail Sheridan, and Frances Curran and Joyce Drummond who were witnesses.

There have since been a few books written on the case: Downfall by Alan McCombes, Tommy Sheridan: From Hero to Zero? A Political Biography by Gregor Gall, and A Parcel of Rogues by Jim Monaghan.

On 30 May 2012 Andy Coulson was charged with perjury in relation to this case. In August 2012 Douglas Wight was charged with various offences in relation to the case, and Bob Bird was charged with various offences in relation to the earlier civil case. On 3 June 2015, Coulson was acquitted after the case against him was dismissed by a judge. The cases against Wight and Bird were also dropped without coming to trial.

A play about the case, I, Tommy, has had three runs in Scotland, the third with Rosie Kane playing herself.

In 2015 the Scottish Criminal Cases Review Commission declined to refer the case to the High Court.
