= Nil by Mouth (charity) =

British charitable organisation

Nil By Mouth is a Scottish charity, established in 2000, which seeks to challenge sectarianism within Scottish Society.

Nil By Mouth was founded as a campaign by Cara Henderson in response to the sectarian murder of her school friend, Mark Scott. Nil By Mouth's purpose is to promote the elimination of Sectarian attitudes and behaviours in Scotland with a view to the advancement of greater understanding and respect.

Nil By Mouth currently delivers inputs to schools, colleges and workplaces on issues surrounding sectarianism, including sectarian language and online hatred. The charity also appears regularly in the media to provide informed comment and analysis of incidents, policy decisions and to promote their own campaigns.

== Mission Statement ==
=== Vision ===
Nil by Mouth is committed to a Scotland free from Sectarianism

=== Purpose ===
Nil by Mouth will promote the elimination of Sectarian attitudes and behaviours in Scotland with a view to the advancement of greater understanding and respect.

=== Aims & Objectives ===
1. Campaign for greater recognition of the damage caused by Sectarianism and promote positive change.

2. Work with legislation and policy developers to support the eradication of Sectarian attitudes, language, and behaviour.

3. Develop, promote, and deliver education and training to promote good relations and challenge Sectarian attitudes, language and behaviour.

4. Provide support and resources for individuals and organisations to challenge Sectarianism

== Background ==
Teenager Mark Scott was murdered as he made his way home from a football match in Glasgow on 7 October 1995. Mark did not know his attacker, Jason Campbell. During Campbell's murder trial, it was revealed that one of the motives for his attack was Mark's perceived religious background based on the colour of his football scarf. Cara Henderson was 15 at the time her school friend was murdered. Four years later, in 1999, she began the process of establishing a campaign against sectarian hatred in Scotland.

Cara began campaigning in the media, telling her story at community events and lobbying politicians and policymakers. She launched a Charter for Change in 2000, which outlined Nil By Mouth's vision for challenging sectarian attitudes in Scotland. Cara won a Philip Lawrence Award for her work in empowering young people. Despite no longer being actively involved, Cara Henderson remains an honorary patron of the charity.

In 2015, Cara was named Evening Times Scotswoman of The Year for 2014. Regarded as one of the most prestigious awards in Scotland, Cara was chosen ahead of First Minister Nicola Sturgeon.

== Activities ==
=== Beyond Religion & Belief ===
Beyond Religion and Belief is Nil by Mouth's workplace training package. The program, which can be delivered free of charge, has been developed and piloted over recent years in partnership with the Scottish Government, the STUC and many other public and private sector employers.

The package provides organizations with a framework to address sectarianism in the workplace and includes advice on; policy and procedure, awareness raising workshops, and a line management development module.

=== Champions for Change ===
In 2011 Nil by Mouth launched their Champions for Change schools programme with the aim of challenging sectarian attitudes through education at as early an age as possible. One of the core aims of Champions for Change was to encourage regular contact between young people from different religious and cultural traditions. The program was supported by the charity's own fundraising efforts and there was no charge to schools involved.

=== Pitch Perfect ===
Pitch Perfect is Nil by Mouth's marketing competition which gives further and higher education students the opportunity to create and design their own anti-sectarian awareness campaign. The first winner was the ‘Kiss Bigotry Goodbye’ campaign, which aims to highlight the positives of being a football fan in Scotland. More recent campaigns include ‘Just the Tip of The Iceberg’ and ‘Don’t Be a Clown’.
