= Bob Bird (editor) =

British journalist

Bob Bird is the former editor of the Scottish edition of the defunct News of the World tabloid.

He is best known for the widespread media coverage over his role in two trials involving former Scottish MSP Tommy Sheridan: the 2006 Sheridan v News Group Newspapers defamation case and the 2010 HM Advocate v Sheridan and Sheridan perjury case.

== Sheridan v News Group Newspapers ==
In the original trial in 2006, Sheridan sued News International, publishers of the Sunday newspaper the News of the World, for defamation, after it published stories making allegations that the married MSP had been indulging extramarital affairs. During the trial, Bob Bird, as editor of the newspaper, testified that he had authorised the payment of £14,000 to two women in return for their story. Sheridan won the case, and was awarded £200,000 in damages. The News of the World launched an immediate appeal against the verdict.

== HM Advocate v Sheridan and Sheridan ==
The Scottish News of the World subsequently claimed to have 'irrefutable proof' that Sheridan had lied on the stand during his libel case; Bob Bird claimed that he had paid personally obtained the information from an informant, having had to strip to his underpants in the process to reassure his source that he was not wearing a wire. Bird paid £200,000 for the secret video footage, which his newspaper claimed showed Sheridan admitting to his extramarital affairs. The allegations eventually led to a police investigation and a court case, with Sheridan standing trial for perjury in 2010. During this trial, Bob Bird denied allegations from Sheridan that Bird had authorised the use of illegal phone taps and bugs to obtain information on the MSP. Sheridan was found guilty of perjury and was subsequently jailed for three years.

== News of the World phone hacking affair ==
Bob Bird's testimony in the second trial came under renewed focus the following year, during the investigation into the News of the World phone hacking affair. Bird had testified during the trial that he had not authorised the use of telephone taps against Sheridan, and that he had no dealing with Glen Mulcaire, the private investigator jailed for his role in the phone hacking affair. Bird had also claimed under affirmation that NOTW company emails requested by Sheridan's defence team as part of their discovery motion (which could have shown evidence of Bird's knowledge and authorisation of the phone hacking) had been lost during a transfer to Mumbai.

However, in 2011, News International admitted that the emails had not gone missing as Bird had claimed, after an independent computer archiving firm announced it had provided evidence to the police over an attempt by Bird to destroy the email archive while they were working with it. The Crown Office subsequently requested a formal investigation from the Strathclyde Police into the witness testimony given by Bird and others at the perjury trial, amid claims from Sheridan's legal team that Bird's testimony was unsafe and that Sheridan would not have been jailed if information regarding the phone hacking and missing emails had been disclosed.

== Personal life ==
Bird was married to BBC Scotland newsreader Jackie Bird. They have two children.
