= Donald Findlay =

Scottish advocate

Donald Finlay KC

Lord Rector of the University of St Andrews
- In office 1993–1999
- Preceded by: Nicky Campbell
- Succeeded by: Andrew Neil

Personal details
- Born: 17 March 1951 (age 75) Cowdenbeath, Fife, Scotland
- Party: Scottish Conservatives
- Education: Harris Academy
- Alma mater: University of Dundee; University of Glasgow

Donald Russell Findlay KC (born 17 March 1951) is a Scottish advocate. He has also held positions as a vice-chairman of Rangers Football Club and twice Rector of the University of St Andrews. He is now chairman of his hometown football club Cowdenbeath.

He is well known for a distinctive style of dress and manner, particularly the smoking of a pipe, as well as his staunch support for Unionism in Scotland and the Scottish Conservatives. He has faced some controversy over several incidents where he sang songs and told allegedly sectarian jokes.

== Early life ==
Findlay was born on 17 March 1951 in Cowdenbeath, Fife, the son of a church beadle. He was subsequently educated at Harris Academy in Dundee, and later at the University of Dundee and at the University of Glasgow.

As a boy, Findlay was influenced to become a lawyer by following the trial of Peter Manuel and by watching the TV series Boyd Q.C..

== Career ==
A combination of high-profile controversies, acute legal skills and a well-cultivated image has generated Findlay a lot of coverage in the Scottish press in recent years and he now has one of the highest legal profiles in Scotland and widely considered to be Scotland's premier criminal law advocate. He took silk, becoming a Queen's Counsel in 1988, but his behaviour has been censured by the Faculty of Advocates on more than one occasion (see below). He has served as a defence lawyer in many high-profile murder cases including Jodi Jones, Mark Scott and the Kriss Donald murder trials. He represented Peter Tobin, the murderer of Angelika Kluk in the so-called "body in the church" case. Findlay is a member of the Optimum Advocates.

At present, he is also a noted after-dinner speaker and in 1997 was a high-profile campaigner on behalf of the unsuccessful Think Twice campaign which supported a double-no vote in the Scottish devolution referendum.

In 2006, he was a defence counsel in the trial of Mohammed Atif Siddique, which saw the youth sentenced to eight years' imprisonment for collecting and sharing online information about terrorists. Donald Findlay successfully appealed this conviction in January 2010. In April 2010 following an eight-week trial he secured the acquittal of the English solicitor Marshall Ronald in the infamous Da Vinci recovery trial.

He also achieved the acquittal, on a technicality, of William Beggs who had been convicted of the murder of Barry Oldham. Beggs went on to attack others including Barry Wallace, the victim of murder in the "Limbs in the Loch" case.

Glasgow based newspaper Daily Record reported that Donald Findlay was one of the highest paid lawyers in 2007, earning £350,000 from his high-profile cases.

In June 2010 Findlay was elected chairman of the Faculty of Advocates Criminal Bar Association.

== Personal life ==
Findlay's academic links with the University of St Andrews (of which Dundee was once part) saw him elected as Lord Rector in 1993 and again in 1996. After his retirement from this position, he took the position of Chancellor of the University's Strafford Club. St Andrews, allegedly, dropped plans to award him an honorary degree after one of his controversial outbursts, most notably being caught on film singing sectarian songs. At this time, he was also noted to be suffering from severe depression and later revealed that he had contemplated suicide.

In the mid-1990s he left his third wife Jennie to set up house with the Reporting Scotland television reporter Paddy Christie. This relationship later foundered.

In May 2011, Findlay was sent a parcel in the post to Cowdenbeath football club where he is chairman. Initially it was thought to contain a bomb but it was later revealed to contain a knife.

Findlay is an atheist, but is mostly noted in Scotland for his support of Rangers, a historically Protestant football club, and for engaging in controversial behaviour that has been widely interpreted as being anti-Catholic in nature. In May 1999 he was accused of sectarianism, after being filmed singing The Sash at a private party organised by a Rangers Supporters Club. For his role in this event, Findlay resigned from the board of the club. After this incident Findlay admitted to feeling so pursued by the media portrayal of him that he had even considered suicide.

In May 2005, shortly after the death of Pope John Paul II, while speaking at Larne Rangers Social Club in Northern Ireland he said "It's very smoky in here tonight – has another f***ing Pope died?" The Scotsman reported that he went on to tell a vulgar joke about a nun, while The Herald reported that his routine was "alleged to have been littered with obscenities and jokes about Catholics" although Findlay has stated that he also made jokes about Protestantism and about the Protestant clergyman and politician Ian Paisley. It is believed that the Faculty of Advocates passed a vote of no confidence on him following the controversy over his comments. He was also fined £3,500 by the Faculty of Advocates.

Findlay was cleared of an allegation of misconduct before the Faculty of Advocates in 2007 following a complaint regarding his conduct at the Rangers Supporters Club in Larne and contribution to a book entitled How Soccer Explains The World – An Unlikely Theory of Globalisation.

Academic offices
Preceded by Nicky Campbell	Rector of the University of St Andrews; 1993–1999	Succeeded by Andrew Neil
