= West of Scotland Band Alliance =

Republican marching organisation in Scotland

The West of Scotland Band Alliance, are the oldest Republican marching organisation in Scotland formed in 1979. They march to promote the establishment of a 32 County Socialist Republic of Ireland. The band alliance regularly organise events to commemorate Irish republican activists who have died for those politics. It was historically much larger during the 1980s when there was a lot more active Republican Flute Bands active. Today, the member bands include the Parkhead Republican Flute Band (Glasgow) and the Garngad Republican Flute Band (Glasgow]).

== History ==
In October 1979, a meeting took place in the East End of Glasgow with the Three flute bands that existed in the city at that time: The James Connolly RFB, The Billy Reid RFB and The Kevin Barry RFB. The purpose of the meeting was to discuss the infamous battle that took place on 21 April on Victoria Road in Glasgow when republicans were marching in support of the blanket protest in Long Kesh. As the march made its way down Victoria Road it came under sustained attack from Scottish loyalists, resulting in several band members being injured.

After the events of that day, it was decided that republicans should organise themselves into one organisation. The West of Scotland Republican Band Alliance was formed. All future marches would be organised by the Band Alliance committee. At their peak in the mid 1980s, there were 18 flute bands in the Band Alliance. The organisation declared its support for former member and Provisional Irish Republican Army prisoner Michael Dickson imprisoned for an attack on the Osnabrück barracks in Germany and are the only republican organisation in Scotland to do so.

== See also ==
- Cairde na hÉireann, pro-SF marching bands
