= Andy Coulson =

English journalist and political strategist

Downing Street Director of Communications
- In office 11 May 2010 – 21 January 2011
- Prime Minister: David Cameron
- Preceded by: Simon Lewis
- Succeeded by: Craig Oliver

Personal details
- Born: Andrew Edward Coulson; 21 January 1968 (age 58) Essex, England
- Party: Conservative
- Spouse: Eloise Patrick (m. 2000)
- Children: 3
- Occupation: Journalist; political strategist

Andrew Edward Coulson (born 21 January 1968) is an English journalist and political strategist.

Coulson was the editor of the News of the World from 2003 to 2007. He resigned following the conviction of one of the newspaper's reporters in relation to illegal phone-hacking. He subsequently joined David Cameron's personnel as communications director in May 2010., resigning in January 2011 because of continued media coverage of the phone-hacking affair.

Coulson was arrested in July 2011 in connection with allegations of corruption and phone hacking. In June 2014 Coulson was found guilty of a charge of conspiracy to intercept voicemails (phone-hacking). He was sentenced to 18 months in prison. On 30 June 2014, it was announced that he would face a retrial over two counts of conspiring to cause misconduct in public office, after the jury in the original trial was unable to reach a verdict on these charges; however, the retrial was scrapped in April 2015

Coulson was also tried over charges that he had committed perjury in the evidence he gave in the trial of Scottish politician Tommy Sheridan in 2010. This trial took place in May 2015, after the general election. On 3 June 2015, he was cleared of those perjury charges,

== Early life and education ==
Andrew Edward Coulson was born on 21 January 1968. He grew up in Wickford, Essex. He had an older sister, Amanda, and an older brother, Paul. All three attended Beauchamps Comprehensive, a secondary school and sixth form college. Andy Coulson was there from 1979 to 1986. Coulson's parents moved from their Basildon council house to nearby Wickford during his childhood.

== Career ==
Coulson started work at 18 as a junior reporter on the Basildon Echo in 1986. In 1988, he moved to The Sun, working with Piers Morgan on the showbiz column Bizarre. In 1994, he briefly moved to the Daily Mail, but after nine weeks moved back to The Sun to edit Bizarre. He hired Dominic Mohan, who was later promoted to editor.

=== News of the World ===
He became deputy editor of the News of the World, the Sunday sister paper of The Sun, in 2000. Coulson replaced Rebekah Wade as editor in 2003. In an interview with the Press Gazette in 2005, he said that "tabloid newspapers in this country do more for its people than any other newspapers in the world".

Coulson resigned on 26 January 2007 over the News of the World phone hacking affair which would several weeks later see the jailing for four months of the paper's Royal correspondent Clive Goodman. Private investigator Glenn Mulcaire, remunerated by the newspaper, was given a custodial sentence of six months.

On 21 July 2009 Coulson appeared in front of the House of Commons Culture, Media and Sport Select Committee and denied any knowledge of the phone hacking scandal, saying "my instructions to the staff were clear – we did not use subterfuge of any kind unless there was a clear public interest in doing so. They were to work within the PCC code at all times".

In 2008 an employment tribunal upheld a claim of bullying by Coulson while he was at the News of The World. A Stratford employment tribunal upheld a claim of unfair dismissal claimed by senior sports writer Matt Driscoll, and stated "We find the behaviour to have been a consistent pattern of bullying behaviour". The judgement singled out Coulson for making "bullying" remarks in an email to Driscoll. The paper was told to pay Driscoll £800,000.

=== Conservative Party communications director ===
Coulson became the Conservative Party's director of communications on 9 July 2007. Various media stories estimated his salary at between £275,000 and £475,000; the party indicated the latter figure was "inaccurate" and that his salary was "substantially less" but refused to provide an exact figure.

=== Downing Street Director of Communications ===
After David Cameron became Prime Minister on 11 May 2010, he appointed Coulson as Director of Communications for the government at 10 Downing Street. His pay was £140,000, the highest paid special advisor.

Coulson announced his resignation on 21 January 2011 because of continued media coverage of the phone-hacking affair. He commented about the News of the World allegations "I stand by what I've said about those events but when the spokesman needs a spokesman it's time to move on." The overall impact from his tenure came to be known as the "Coulson effect".

In July 2011 questions were raised about Coulson's security vetting at Number Ten. He had not been subjected to the highest level of vetting, "developed vetting", allowing unrestricted access to top secret material. His predecessors had had the highest level of vetting, as did his successor and (after his departure) his deputy. The Guardian said that the disclosure "is understood to have 'absolutely shocked' some Whitehall information staff." According to Chris Bryant MP, senior officials working with Coulson believed that he had the same clearance level as his predecessor. It later emerged that he was still being paid by News International while working for the then opposition leader.

Prior to the jury handing down their verdict after Coulson's trial, Cameron issued a "full and frank" apology for hiring Coulson, saying "I am extremely sorry that I employed him. It was the wrong decision and I am very clear about that." The judge hearing Coulson's trial was critical of the prime minister, pondering whether the intervention was out of ignorance or deliberate, and demanded an explanation.

=== Private consultancy ===
On 7 February 2011, Coulson and his wife established Elbrus Consultants Ltd. The purpose of the company is not recorded by Companies House, but is reportedly a public relations agency. Clients include One Young World. Kate Robertson of One Young World told The Guardian "He can't do One Young World work at the moment, that is absolutely clear".

In January 2016, Coulson launched a new corporate PR agency offering communications strategy services in partnership with Henry Chappell, Coulson Chappell. In March 2017, Coulson Chappell was awarded a contract by the Telegraph Media Group (TMG) to improve the standing of the company's publications, The Daily Telegraph and The Sunday Telegraph.

=== Renewed allegations on phone hacking ===
As the Conservative Party's director of communications, Coulson continued to be subjected to allegations that he was aware of the hacking of phones while serving as the editor of News of the World. On 7 July 2009, John Prescott called on leader of the Conservative Party David Cameron to remove Coulson from his position, after The Guardian revealed further details about phone-hacking by the News of the World. Cameron, though, defended Coulson on the morning of 9 July: "I believe in giving people a second chance. As director of communications for the Conservatives he does an excellent job in a proper, upright way at all times."

On 1 September 2010, The New York Times printed new allegations from former News of the World reporters alleging that Coulson had "actively encouraged" reporters to illegally intercept voicemail messages, and that he "was present during discussions about phone hacking". Coulson has denied these latest claims. Sean Hoare, – showbusiness reporter at News of the World during Coulson's reign – speaking on Five Live, who accused Coulson of lying, has said that indeed Coulson did not ask him to phone hack but veiled his request in "metaphorical language" and asked him to practise his "dark arts". And Clive Goodman, in a letter from 2007: "The practice was widely discussed in the daily editorial conference, until explicit reference to it was banned by the editor."

A report aired on Channel 4's Dispatches in October included remarks made by an unnamed source, said to have been a former senior journalist at the News of the World who worked alongside Coulson. The source alleged that Coulson had personally listened to messages obtained through phone hacking.

He was a witness in HM Advocate v Sheridan and Sheridan, where he denied under oath that he had any knowledge of phone hacking at the News of the World, or that he knew Glenn Mulcaire, the private detective at the centre of controversy.

However, the Crown Prosecution Service said in December 2010 that it had determined that there was insufficient evidence to charge Coulson over allegations that he was aware of phone-hacking at the publication. The CPS said that witnesses interviewed by Metropolitan Police – including those who had previously made allegations through media outlets – had not been willing to provide admissible evidence.

The Guardian reported on 7 July 2011 that Coulson was to be arrested the following day, along with a senior journalist whom the paper refused to name.

Coulson was arrested at Scotland Yard at 10:30 am on 8 July 2011. He was questioned under caution, and later that day released on police bail until October, but made no comment on his release.

On 24 July 2012, Coulson was charged along with seven others for "conspiring to intercept communications without lawful authority from 3 October 2000 to 9 August 2006." These charges were made about 1 year after the Metropolitan Police Service reopened its dormant investigation into phone hacking, about 3 years after the then Assistant Commissioner of the Metropolitan Police Service told the Commons Culture, Media and Sport Committee that "no additional evidence has come to light," 5 years after Coulson and News International executives began claiming that phone hacking was the work of a single "rogue reporter," 10 years after The Guardian began reporting that the Met had evidence of widespread illegal acquisition of confidential information, and 13 years after the Met began accumulating "boxloads" of that evidence, including sources for News of the World journalists while Coulson was editor, but kept it unexamined in trash bags at Scotland Yard.

Coulson's trial over the phone-hacking claims started in October 2013. In June 2014, Coulson was found guilty of one charge of conspiracy to intercept voicemails and he was sentenced to 18 months in prison on 4 July 2014. He was sentenced on 4 July 2014 to 18 months in prison. On 21 November 2014, Coulson was released from prison, having served less than five months of his 18-month prison sentence. It was reported that as a condition of his early release on home detention curfew (HDC) Coulson would have to wear an electronic tag until he had served half of his full sentence.

On 30 June 2014, it was announced that Coulson was to face a retrial, together with the News of the World's former royal editor Clive Goodman, over two counts of conspiring to cause misconduct in public office – in relation to the alleged purchase of confidential royal phone directories in 2005 from a palace police officer – after the jury in the original trial was unable to reach a verdict on them. Other defendants were cleared. On 17 April 2015, the Crown Prosecution Service announced that Coulson's retrial was to be scrapped, along with that of Goodman and the trials of seven other journalists.

=== Perjury trial ===
Coulson was detained and charged with perjury by Strathclyde Police on 30 May 2012 in relation to evidence he had given in the 2010 trial of Scottish politician Tommy Sheridan and Gail Sheridan (HM Advocate v Sheridan and Sheridan) He was scheduled to stand trial in April 2015 but the trial ( HM Advocate v Coulson) was postponed to 11 May 2015 because of the general election.

On 1 June 2015, the judge, Lord Burns, acquitted Coulson. However, the acquittal was suspended while the Crown considered whether to appeal the decision and was therefore not announced until 3 June. Explaining his ruling, Lord Burns said that for Coulson to be found guilty it was necessary for the Crown to prove that the allegedly untrue evidence he had given at the 2010 Sheridan trial had been relevant to the issues in it. The judge added that it was for him, and not the jury, to decide on this aspect of the case and that the Crown's legal submissions had failed to satisfy him that

== In popular culture ==
Coulson was portrayed by Andrew Bone in the 2015 Channel 4 television film Coalition, and by Mark Stobbart in the ITV drama about the News International phone hacking scandal, The Hack.

== Personal life ==
Coulson married his wife, Eloise Patrick, in 2000, with whom he has three children. In October 2013, it was revealed that Coulson had had an affair with Rebekah Brooks that lasted from 1998 to 2007.

== See also ==
- News International phone hacking scandal
- News media phone hacking scandal
- Phone hacking scandal reference lists
- Metropolitan police role in phone hacking scandal

Media offices
Preceded by Paul Connew	Deputy Editor of the News of the World; 2000–2003	Succeeded by Neil Wallis
Preceded by Rebekah Wade	Editor of the News of the World; 2003–2007	Succeeded by Colin Myler
Government offices
Preceded by Simon Lewis	Downing Street Director of Communications; 2010–2011	Succeeded by Craig Oliver
