= David Burns, Lord Burns =

Scottish judge

The Honourable Lord Burns

Senator of the College of Justice
- Incumbent
- Assumed office 2012
- Nominated by: Alex Salmond; As First Minister
- Appointed by: Elizabeth II

Personal details
- Born: 1952 Scotland
- Education: Dundee
- Profession: Advocate
- Website: Judiciary of Scotland

David Spencer Burns, Lord Burns (born 1952) is a Senator of the College of Justice.

Burns was admitted to the Faculty of Advocates in 1977 and became a Queen's Counsel in 1991. Before admission, he worked as a legal assistant in New York and California. He practiced family, personal injury and planning. Between 1989 and 1991, he was full-time Advocate Depute. He was appointed Deputy Commissioner of Social Security. During the Lockerbie trial (2000–2002), Burns was one of the advocates representing Abdelbaset al-Megrahi.

Burns served as a temporary judge from 2002 to 2005, and he became a part-time sheriff in 2007. On 1 June 2012, it was announced he had been appointed a Senator of the College of Justice, and he took up the post on 12 July 2012.
