= Cairde na hÉireann =

Irish Republican organization based in Scotland

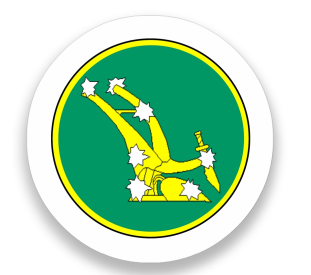
- Cairde na hÉireann's logo consisting of the Starry Plough, an Irish Republican symbol.
- Formation: 2004
- Type: Irish Republicanism, United Ireland
- Purpose: A 32 County Socialist and a Republican United Ireland.
- Location: Scotland
- Affiliations: Sinn Féin, Scottish Republican Socialist Movement

Cairde na hÉireann (CNE) (Irish: Friends of Ireland) is an Irish republican organisation in Scotland.

== Aims and principles ==
Membership of Cairde na hÉireann is open to anyone regardless of faith, race, sex, sexuality, or nationality. The stated aims of Cairde na hÉireann are to:

- campaign for a united Ireland;
- support sister organisations in Ireland;
- promote a new Ireland based on the principles of justice and equality;
- support initiatives aimed at improving the material conditions of the Irish community in Scotland
- campaign against racism and sectarianism.

The group in a submission to the Scottish Executive estimated in 2005 that it represents around 2,000 people, including 300 from the James Connolly society and a number of flute bands with between 55 and 70 members each. 3,000 people had attended their recent marches in Coatbridge.

== History ==
Cairde na hÉireann was formed as a split from the West of Scotland Band Alliance (WoSBA) in 2004. The WoSBA are considered supporters of dissident Republicans and are not recognised by Sinn Féin.

== Marches and controversy ==
The organisation has been involved in discussions with the Scottish Executive over proposals to restrict and regulate marches in Scotland. The group's national organiser at the time, Jim Slavin, said: "I think vetoes and banning marches is not the solution, I think dialogue is a solution and coming to an understanding".

A Cairde na hÉireann march in Glasgow on 21 January 2006 attracted police criticism. The parade was delayed for 30 minutes "as, contrary to permission conditions, there were groups dressed in paramilitary-style clothing". In addition, concerning protests during the parade, Strathclyde Police stated: "Many of those taking part in the procession clearly antagonised the protesters".

In October 2006, a Cairde na hÉireann march was banned from going through Ayr by South Ayrshire Council after police complaints. It was reported the march was banned after the previous year's procession when marchers produced banners declaring "Justice for Peter McBride", in reference to a man killed in Northern Ireland by Ayr soldier James Fisher. They also distributed posters informing the people of Ayr they should be ashamed to have a murderer living among them. South Scotland MSP Phil Gallie, the region which Ayr is part of, who opposed the march, said: "I feel that justice has been done here because this group basically lied to the police last year and therefore cannot be trusted. We simply can’t have people slating our own servicemen and women on their own doorstep."
