= Sole trader insolvency =

According to the Office for National Statistics, sole proprietors represented 23.8% of all UK enterprise in 2010. Of that number, more than half a million sole traders were operating via the PAYE or VAT system alone. Sole traders are a distinct legal entity, operating as one type of UK business structure. In the event of financial problems affecting the business, they are subject to different rules to those that govern companies.

Sole trader insolvency occurs when the business cannot meet financial obligations. It may be that bills cannot be paid on time, leading to debts which eventually attract legal action by creditors. Insolvency does not automatically equate to bankruptcy; definitions of insolvency are provided within the Insolvency Act 1986. Cash flow insolvency occurs when a business cannot meet its credit obligations as they fall due. Balance sheet insolvency occurs when the businesses’ liabilities exceed its assets. According to Business Link there are a number of factors that can lead to sole trader insolvency. These can include late invoicing for goods or services, accepting orders that exceed its financial capacity to deliver, failure to recover debts, excess inventory and unsuitable credit arrangements and often personal drawings taken in excess of profit.

== UK Insolvency statistics ==
During 2010, the recorded number of individual insolvencies in England and Wales was 135,089 according to the UK Government’s Insolvency Service (including provisional figures from the final quarter). The figures had fallen by 13.6% during the final quarter compared to the same quarter during 2009. 12,049 individuals declared formal bankruptcy, a drop of almost a third (29.2%) on the previous year. 12,058 entered formal Individual Voluntary Arrangements (IVAs), representing an annual drop of 5.4%. A further 6,172 entered a formal Debt Relief Order (DRO), an increase of 15.4% on the previous year’s figures. The levels of self-employed bankruptcies had fallen slightly by the third quarter of 2010 to make up 11.9% of the total within England and Wales. This represented an improvement on the number of bankrupt sole traders during the previous year and up to June 2010.

== UK Insolvency Law and sole traders ==
=== Insolvency Act 1986 ===
This legislation provides the legal framework for two key formal insolvency solutions relevant to sole traders: namely bankruptcy and Individual Voluntary Arrangements. It also makes provision for company insolvency

Bankruptcy laws vary somewhat between Scotland, Northern Ireland, Wales and England. In England, Wales & Northern Ireland, the applicable law is the Insolvency Act 1986. Bankruptcy requires the surrender of all valuable assets to the Official Receiver, including any property interests. It is extremely unlikely the business activities would be permitted to continue. Additionally, there are quite a number of other legal restrictions upon the bankrupt individual. Individuals are therefore cautioned by the Insolvency Service to explore whether alternatives exist.

Individual Voluntary Arrangements (IVAs) operate in England, Wales & Northern Ireland as a contractual agreement between the insolvent individual and the creditors they owe money to. IVAs are facilitated by an Insolvency Practitioner and are an agreement that the individual will repay agreed instalments over a fixed period of time. In Scotland, the Protected Trust Deed serves a similar purpose.

=== Insolvency Act 2000 ===
This act was introduced in two stages: 2 April 2001 and 1 January 2003. It made provision for a new moratorium method to address financial difficulties faced by small companies. Relevant to sole traders, it also somewhat amended Individual Voluntary Arrangements procedures.

==== Key amendments for sole traders ====
The Insolvency Act 2000 somewhat modified procedures for Individual Voluntary Arrangements. Previously, under the Insolvency Act 1986 an individual had to initially apply to the court for an interim order. This order would then be followed by the next legal procedures towards arranging the IVA itself. The Insolvency Act 2000 removed the need to apply for an interim order, except where a petition for the individual’s bankruptcy already applied.

There were also changes aiming to fulfil the overall purpose of the IVA, namely coming to an acceptable agreement between the individual and those they owed money to. Two cases were heard in the High Court of circumstances where this interim order had been granted but landlords were nonetheless able to lawfully gain the right of peaceable re-entry / seizing of goods in respect of rent arrears. The Insolvency Act 2000 accordingly introduced amendments aiming to prevent this type of intervention and accordingly promote the negotiation phase instead.

== Insolvency options for sole traders ==
=== Voluntary arrangements ===
It may be possible to continue to trade by negotiating with creditors to gain more flexible payment arrangements. This type of informal arrangement may be facilitated by a business rescue professional but will not be legally binding on creditors. By contrast, Individual Voluntary Arrangements are legally binding on all creditors providing those representing 75% of the total debt owed agree to the IVA proposal.

=== Bankruptcy ===
An individual may voluntarily petition the local Court with bankruptcy jurisdiction for a Bankruptcy Order (BO)to be made, usually by a District Judge. The petition will require a supporting statement of affairs. On the making of the BO, the Court notifies the Official Receiver (OR) and may in certain cases also appoint an Insolvency Practitioner. The OR has a dual function, to investigate the causes of financial failure and report any misconduct and to act as Trustee if no trustee is appointed by the Court. A creditor may petition for an individual’s bankruptcy using a prescribed series of legal steps and must be owed a minimum fixed amount of debt of at least £750. A County Court Judgement must be granted in their favour for that debt. The creditor must then issue a statutory demand for repayment. Should the demand fail to be settled within 21 days, the creditor has the option to proceed with a bankruptcy petition to the court. Following the issue of a bankruptcy order from either route, the individual cedes control of their assets to an Insolvency Practitioner, to be sold to raise funds towards repaying creditors.

== See also ==
- Sole Proprietorship
- Insolvency
