= Personal Insolvency Arrangement =

A Personal Insolvency Arrangement (PIA) is a statutory mechanism in Ireland for individuals who cannot repay their debts as they come due but who wish to avoid bankruptcy. The arrangement is one of the three alternatives authorized under Ireland's Personal Insolvency Act 2012; Debt Settlement Arrangements (DSA) and Debt Relief Notices (DRN) are the other two arrangements. A PIA is a legal agreement between a debtor and their creditors that is mediated and administered by a Personal Insolvency Practitioner (PIP). A PIA usually lasts for a term of six years and must include both unsecured debt and secured debts.

== Eligibility ==
Eligibility criteria for a debtor include:

- The debtor is insolvent, that is they cannot pay debts in full when they are due.
- The debtor owes a debt to at least one secured creditor holding security over Irish property or assets.
- The debtor has secured debts less than €3 million (unless creditors agree to upper limit)
- The debtor has co-operated with their secured creditor under a mortgage arrears process for 6 months.
- The debtor must live in the Republic of Ireland, or ordinarily resided or had a place of business within Ireland.
- The debtor provides a Prescribed Financial Statement and a PIP has examined the debtors financial situation and confirms eligibility.

Furthermore, a debtor must not have any agreements mandated under the instant Act, be bankrupt, nor have accumulated 25% or more of their total debt during the previous 6 months.

== Role of Personal Insolvency Practitioners ==
The Personal Insolvency Act 2012 envisages that Personal Insolvency Arrangements can only be applied for through an approved third party, termed a Personal Insolvency Practitioner. The practitioners must be authorised by the Insolvency Service of Ireland (ISI) and include Solicitors Barristers, Qualified accountants, qualified financial advisers etc. As of 31 October 2013, there were a total of 72 registered Personal Insolvency Practitioners.

== Debts covered under the agreement ==
The type of debts that can be included in a PIA are split into three types; Included, Excludable, and Excluded.

- Included Debts

- Housing loans on the principal private residence
- Loans on investment property
- Mortgages/loans on buy-to-let properties
- Personal guarantees
- Personal loans
- Credit Union loans
- Business/commercial loans
- Credit card balances
- Store cards balances
- Overdrafts

- Excludable debt (debts that can only be included with creditor consent)

- Any taxes, duties, or levies owed or require payment to the State
- Local government charges
- Local authority rates
- Anything owed under the Nursing Home Support Scheme
- Annual service charges payable to apartment and housing estate management companies
- Any debts incurred under the Social Welfare Consolidation Act 2005

- Excluded Debts (debts that cannot be included)

- Court ordered family maintenance payments
- Court fines arising from criminal offenses
- Debts arising from personal injury or wrongful death court-awarded claims
- Debts incurred from fraudulent loans

== Agreement processes authorized under the Act ==
=== Debtor insolvency declaration ===
Initially, the debtor is required to provide a PIP with a full disclosure of his or her financial situation. After appraisal, the PIP suggests best possible agreement. If recommended, the debtor can proceed with the PIA application and appoint the PIP to act on their behalf. A Prescribed Financial Statement is then prepared for the debtor that details key information about a debtor's finances and clearly shows their insolvent status. It must be fully supported by appropriate financial documentation, such as pay slips, bank statements, etc. The debtor makes a statutory declaration in the presence of witnesses to confirm the Prescribed Financial Statement is true and accurate, and completes and signs the additional documents needed to accompany the Statement to apply for a Protective Certificate. The full application is sent to the Insolvency Service of Ireland (ISI).

=== Issuance of Protective Certificate ===
A court is authorized to issue a Protective Certificate to the debtor, which provides PIP giving the debtor 70 days protection from creditors in which they can prepare a PIA proposal.

=== Preparation of PIA proposal ===
After issuance of the Protective Certificate, the PIP is mandated to prepare a draft PIA. During the process, the market value of the secured assets can either be agreed between the debtor, creditor and PIP or the services of an independent valuer can be solicited.

=== Creditors' meeting and approval of PIA ===
After the debtor agrees to the PIA proposal, the PIP is required to call a creditors' meeting in which, through voting, creditors representing at least 65% of the total debts must agree to the proposal, including creditors representing not less than 50% of the unsecured debt and not less than 50% of the secured debt. After acceptance through the vote, the documents are required to be forwarded to ISI, which will notify the Circuit Court. Thus final approval sits with the court, and any creditor's objection will be considered by them. The law requires that after approval the debtor's name, address details, birth year, and PIA start date are made available on the ISI website.

=== Execution of PIA ===
After formal approval by the courts and notification with ISI, debtors are required to make payments to the PIP, which in turn distributes the payments to creditors as per agreements. A PIA has a lifespan of six years.

==== Completion ====
If a debtor completes all of their obligations under the PIA, the agreement is considered complete. At completion, the PIP through creditors finalizes the treatment of the remaining debt balances: unsecured debt balances will be written off, while secured debt balances are discharged as per the PIA agreement. The PIP coordinates the removal of the debtor's information from the Register of Personal Insolvency Arrangements within three months, making the debtor solvent.

==== Failure ====
A PIA will be deemed to have failed if creditors do not agree to the PIA or if the debtor fails to maintain his or her duties and obligations. This can be avoided if a debtor can anticipate a potential problem keeping up with payments, because their PIP may be able to arrange a variation with creditors to ensure a way can be found to continue with the PIA and prevent it from failing.

== Insolvency agreements in the UK ==
In the UK, a similar arrangement exists under the name of individual voluntary arrangement (IVA). IVA has been mandated under the Insolvency Act 1986.
