= Baines and Ernst =

Baines & Ernst
- Type: Private Listed
- Industry: Financial services
- Founded: December 1996
- Headquarters: Manchester, England
- Services: Debt management plans, Debt Relief Orders, Debt settlements, IVA, Bankruptcy and Trust Deed Advisory Services
- Number of employees: 252 (2014)
- Parent: MoneyPlus Group (MoneyPlus.com)
- Website: www.bainesandernst.co.uk

Baines & Ernst (Baines & Ernst Limited) is part of the Paymex Group. Established in Manchester in 1996 as a specialist debt management company, they provide services to help people get out of debt including Debt management plans, Debt Relief Orders and Debt settlements.

The company also offers an advisory service in Individual Voluntary Arrangements and Bankruptcy to people living in England and Wales, and Protected Trust Deeds to people living in Scotland.

== History ==
Baines & Ernst was originally formed as a debt collection company with 50 staff members but quickly evolved into the debt management sector; offering debt advice and debt help to people who had fallen behind on repayments to creditors – the companies they owed money to. In 2009, the company was approved by the Secretary of State as a Competent Authority for Debt Relief Orders in the UK and Wales. The company was also approved to provide Debt Relief Orders to people living in Northern Ireland in 2011.

Baines & Ernst was the first company to be established from its parent company, the Paymex Group. Baines & Ernst associated companies include Baker Evans for Bankruptcy and Baines & Ernst Corporate for business insolvency.

The company's Head Office is located in Manchester City Centre and employs 252 staff as of 2014.

In July 2017, the business and assets of Baines & Ernst were sold to MoneyPlus Group.

== Financial Services ==
Baines & Ernst's main service is the Debt Management Plan – also referred to as a DMP.

A Debt Relief Order – also known as a DRO – came into force in the UK and Wales in April 2009 and in Northern Ireland in 2011 following its introduction in the Tribunals, Courts and Enforcement Act 2007 as a new form of Bankruptcy.

Debt Relief Orders are suitable for people who do not own their own home, have little surplus income and assets and less than £15,000 of debt. Baines & Ernst was approved by the Secretary of State as a Competent Authority for the provision of Debt Relief Orders in the UK, Wales and Northern Ireland. The company provides the DRO service for free but those applying for a DRO must pay a fee of £90 to the Insolvency Service.

== Industry Regulations ==
As of April 2014, Baines & Ernst are authorised and regulated by the Financial Conduct Authority (FCA).

== Industry Memberships ==
- Debt Managers Standards Association (DEMSA)
