= Official receiver =

British court official

An officer of the Insolvency Service of the United Kingdom, an official receiver (OR) is an officer of the court to which they are attached. The OR is answerable to the courts for carrying out the courts' orders and for fulfilling their duties under law. They also act on directions, instructions and guidance from the service's Inspector General or, less often, from the Secretary of State for Business and Trade.

== Responsibilities ==
An OR has the following responsibilities:

- acting as interim receiver or provisional liquidator: At any time after a petition for an insolvency order under section 122 of the Insolvency Act 1986 (c. 45) has been presented, the court may appoint the OR as interim receiver (for an individual) or as provisional liquidator (for a company). This is to protect a debtor's property, or take control of a company' affairs, pending the outcome of the hearing of the petition;
- acting as receiver, trustee or liquidator: The OR becomes receiver and manager when a court makes a bankruptcy order against an individual. The OR becomes the first liquidator when the court makes a winding-up order against a company. The OR is responsible for protecting the assets of the insolvent person or company and will take immediate steps to secure any property or other assets. If no private sector insolvency practitioner (IP) is subsequently appointed, the OR becomes the trustee of the insolvent person's estate or the liquidator or remains the liquidator of the company; and
- acting as supervisor: in a fast-track voluntary arrangement proposed by a bankrupt.

The bankrupt or the company directors must give the OR information about their own or the company's affairs. The OR will interview them, examine their financial records, and make background enquiries of others who have had dealings with them (e.g. banks, accountants etc.). In every case, the OR reports to creditors and shareholders giving details of assets and liabilities.

Depending on the nature and monetary value of the assets, the OR may arrange a meeting of the creditors (and of contributories in a winding-up) to consider appointing an IP to act as trustee or liquidator in his place. Alternatively, the OR may consult the creditors and ask the Secretary of State to appoint an IP. (This is usually done when such an appointment needs to be made quickly – for instance, when there are large amounts of perishable goods).

If an IP is appointed, the OR will hand over administration. Otherwise, the OR acts as trustee or liquidator to sell the assets, distribute the proceeds to creditors, and complete the administration of the estate (mostly achieved within 12 months of the insolvency order). Whether or not the OR continues as trustee or liquidator, they remain responsible for investigating the insolvent's affairs.

== History ==
The office of official receiver was established by the Bankruptcy Act 1883 (46 & 47 Vict. c. 52). Their role was originally confined to personal bankruptcy, but it was extended to companies in compulsory liquidation by the Companies (Winding Up) Act 1890 (53 & 54 Vict. c. 63).

== See also ==
- Indian Corporate Law Service
- Simplified individual voluntary arrangement
- Bankruptcy
- Liquidation
- Administration order
- Administrative receivership
- Protected trust deed (Scotland)
