= Fast-track voluntary arrangement =

A fast-track voluntary arrangement (FTVA), in the United Kingdom, is a binding agreement with a debtors creditors to pay all or part of the money owed to them. A debtor can only enter into it after they have been made bankrupt. In an FTVA an official receiver acts as nominee; that is, he (or she) helps to prepare a proposal that is put to creditors and, if they accept the proposal, acts as supervisor, looking after the arrangement and making payments to creditors in accordance with the proposal.

FTVAs were introduced in 2004 by a 2003 amendment to the Insolvency Act 1986.

== Official receiver's fees ==
The official receiver's fee to act as nominee is currently £300, and as supervisor he also charges 15% of all sums realised. In addition, a registration fee of £35 for the FTVA is payable in order that the FTVA is recorded on the public register of all individual voluntary arrangements (IVAs). The FTVA is cheaper than an ordinary IVA as there are set fees and costs.
