= Debtor and Creditor =

Debtor and Creditor can refer to:

- Debtor
- Creditor

== See also ==
- Debt
