= Bury F.C. financial crisis =

Financial issues at English football club

Bury F.C. suffered periodic financial problems during the early 21st century, going into administration in 2002 and getting into further difficulties in 2012. However, the club, then newly promoted to EFL League One, faced a major financial crisis in the summer of 2019, and, as a result was expelled from the English Football League on 27 August 2019. A fan-owned phoenix club, Bury AFC, was formed while the club's owner separately continued to fight administration and sought Bury's return to the football pyramid. In November 2020, the club went into administration again, and in May 2021 the club's Gigg Lane ground was put up for sale. In August 2021, a fans-backed group, Est.1885, unveiled a bid to buy both the club and Gigg Lane, and a deal was eventually agreed in January 2022. Finalisation of the deal was dependent upon a successful merger with Bury AFC (competing in the North West Counties Football League), but tensions between rival groups delayed agreement until May 2023. On 5 June 2023, the Football Association confirmed that the name "Bury Football Club" could be used again, with the club competing in the Premier Division of the North West Counties Football League.

== Background ==
In 2001–02, financial problems caused by the collapse of ITV Digital brought the club into administration and to the brink of folding, but a supporters' campaign kept the club afloat. Ten years later, in December 2012, Bury again fell into financial difficulty, this time as a result of poor attendances. Property investor Stewart Day became chairman of the club in May 2013, helping to reduce its debts. In December 2018, Day sold the club to businessman Steve Dale for £1.

== 2019 financial crisis ==
In February 2019, Dale paid an outstanding tax bill to avoid a HM Revenue and Customs (HMRC) winding-up order. However, financial problems resurfaced on 2 April after staff and players did not receive their March salaries on time. On 10 April, former head coach Chris Brass, claiming to be a creditor of the club, issued a winding-up petition to be heard in the High Court. The winding-up petition was adjourned until 15 May (after the end of the league season). In addition to Brass's claim, HMRC was claiming approximately £277,000.

On 25 April, Dale said the club's financial problems were "far in excess" of what he understood when he took over, and placed the club on the open market. Around £1.6m was needed to pay wages, HMRC and pensions to the end of May, with only £180,000 income expected during that period. On 19 June, a High Court hearing on the winding-up petition was adjourned until 31 July, to allow additional time for a potential sale.

To secure the club's future, Dale proposed a Company Voluntary Arrangement (CVA) to ensure payment of the club's football creditors in full while unsecured creditors, including HMRC, would receive 25% of monies owed. That was approved by creditors on 18 July. As a result, the winding-up petition was dismissed by the High Court on 31 July.

Bury's preparation for the new season was further impacted by the loss of manager Ryan Lowe and several members of the first-team squad.

On 25 July, the EFL sought further details on how Bury would satisfy the CVA. Without proof of the club's financial viability, Bury could be expelled from the EFL. Satisfactory proof was not provided, and on 29 July the club's opening league match of the season was suspended, as were four further league games.

On 8 August, Bury was given 14 days to provide the EFL with a plan to pay off outstanding creditors. On 12 August, Dale said he would consider selling the club after staff 'implored' him to accept a newly received offer to buy the club, but, on 20 August, he rejected a deal that would have secured the survival of the club, believing he could get a better offer. Bury North MP James Frith wrote to EFL chair Debbie Jevans asking for the expulsion deadline to be extended; Andy Burnham, the Mayor of Greater Manchester, also requested an extension. On 22 August, the EFL gave an extra 48 hours to avoid expulsion after it emerged that four parties were interested in a takeover. Late on 23 August, Dale was said to have agreed a sale to analytics company C&N Sporting Risk. The following morning, an EFL board meeting gave Bury 27 August to complete the sale, though Jevans later said a further short extension might be granted if the sale was very close to conclusion. Shortly before the deadline, however, C&N Sporting Risk pulled out of the deal saying it was "unable to proceed".

=== EFL expulsion ===
On 27 August, the EFL announced that Bury's membership of the league had been withdrawn. Bury were the first club to be expelled from the Football League since Maidstone United in 1992. After the expulsion, it emerged that a late bid from a Brazilian-backed potential buyer had been rejected. The Insolvency Practitioners Association said it would investigate Bury's CVA over allegations that Dale had tried to engineer a payout to a newly formed company, RCR Holdings, run by his daughter's partner, and 140 youth players were released by Bury's academy.

On 30 August, Bury was "actively considering" legal action against the EFL over its expulsion. After local MP James Frith said he would propose that the EFL reinstate Bury in League Two in 2020–21, the EFL said it would consult member clubs. The EFL also announced an independent review of EFL regulations concerning the financial sustainability of member clubs, which in February 2020 concluded that any additional EFL action "would not have made any difference to the eventual outcome"—"a lack of owner funding" ultimately caused Bury's demise, exacerbated by excessive wages paid to players under Day's chairmanship. Meanwhile, Greater Manchester Police confirmed it was investigating a fraud allegation made in June 2019 in relation to Bury's finances. The Frith-led working group's proposal to admit Bury to League Two (backed by the Bury FC Supporters' Trust, Bury South MP Ivan Lewis, Andy Burnham, the Greater Manchester Combined Authority and Bury Metropolitan Borough Council) was sent to the EFL on 20 September, but was rejected at a meeting of the EFL's remaining 71 member clubs on 26 September. Following the EFL ruling, the working group suggested that Bury apply for a place in the National League in 2020–21, subject to ownership and financial issues being resolved.

Another winding-up petition was brought before the High Court by HMRC on 16 October 2019. It was adjourned for 14 days to allow the club more time to settle with small business creditors. Everton chairman Bill Kenwright attempted to give Bury £1m to help save the club, but this was disallowed under EFL conflict of interest rules. On 30 October, the petition adjournment was extended for another 35 days to 4 December after the club argued that it had continued to automatically pay taxes on unpaid wages. The judge agreed that an extension was necessary for HMRC to establish if the club had overpaid. On 4 December, the club was granted a further extension until 18 December with HMRC ordered to process the club's returns and ascertain the exact amount still owed. When the High Court reconvened, this winding-up petition was dismissed; HMRC said an unspecified debt had been paid.

Whilst the formation of the fan-owned phoenix club was underway, Bury FC owner Steve Dale continued to fight administration and for a return to the football pyramid. On 31 January 2020, the club was in danger of liquidation as Dale had failed to pay any money to creditors under the terms of the July 2019 CVA. Dale had to pay at least £2m by 11 February or the CVA would be ended; debts totalling around £5m would become immediately due, with creditors able to petition for the club to be wound up. On 14 February, Dale was reported to have defaulted on the plan to settle outstanding debts, casting fresh doubt over Bury's future, and making liquidation more likely. A month later, on 16 March 2020, Dale was reported to be seeking a new CVA; this followed a formal notice that the previous CVA had been terminated on 9 March. The supervisor of that initial CVA, Steven Wiseglass, warned that if no new CVA is agreed by 1 April, he would seek to wind-up the club and appoint a liquidator. The consortium attempt to complete a solvent takeover of the club fell through at the end of March. In late April, Dale was reported to have spent £250,000 in appointing a QC to lead a legal claim for damages against the EFL, and to have applied to the FA for a place in the National League or National League North (tiers five or six) in the 2020–21 season. However, on 7 August, the application was rejected by the FA, who cited the club's "financial resources, ownership and insolvency status"; the club said it planned to submit an application for the 2021–22 season, but none was sent.

On 30 August 2020, 12 months after the club's EFL expulsion, the Manchester Evening News said: "Bury FC still exists, though, if only on paper. With no players, no league to play in, and no employees to speak of, it is little more than a hollow shell of the club fans knew and loved." The MEN report said that the club "continues to limp on" but its future was uncertain and the danger of liquidation remained, though most fans still hoped for an eventual resurrection. Meanwhile, Dale began making statements on the club website, branding the fan-owned Bury AFC as "fake".

On 27 November 2020, Dale finally placed the club into administration, with Wiseglass appointed administrator. In January 2021, a Nottinghamshire-based businessman and investor in Ilkeston Town, David Hilton, was reported to be interested in buying Bury FC, which was said to have debts of over £15 million.

In May 2021, the club's Gigg Lane ground was put up for sale by the administrator. In June, Wiseglass said he had received two ultimately unsuccessful offers to buy the club, and that a deadline of 5 August had been set for bids to buy Gigg Lane. He also confirmed, in an update to the administration records filed at Companies House, that the club's total liability amounted to £12,545,559. On 26 August, Wiseglass said offers had been received from several 'interested parties', with a fans-backed group, Est.1885, among the bidders to buy the ground and club. Supported by local MPs James Daly and Christian Wakeford and by Bury MBC, the Est.1885 bid was backed by an "anonymous benefactor willing to bankroll ambitions for a fans-led club". On 22 October, the administrators confirmed that Est.1885 had been given exclusivity to buy both the club and Gigg Lane. The benefactor was English-born but now California-based businessman Peter Alexander, a lifelong Shakers fan who also wanted to reconcile any differences with Bury AFC. On 23 December 2021, the UK Government, through the Community Ownership Fund run by the Department for Levelling Up, Housing and Communities, pledged £1m towards the bid to buy back Gigg Lane.

In November 2021, a court order was made extending the period of administration of The Bury Football Club Company Ltd to 27 May 2023 to allow time for the administrator to complete the sale of the stadium and to conclude investigations into the club's financial affairs and the actions of its current and former directors and officers.

On 7 January 2022, Est.1885 said contracts had been exchanged on a deal to buy the stadium, the club's trading name and memorabilia, with plans to resume competitive football in August 2022. On 13 January, Bury MBC agreed a financial contribution of up to £450,000 towards the costs of recommissioning Gigg Lane (this was later made conditional on a successful merger with Bury AFC).

On 18 February 2022, Est.1885 completed the purchase of Gigg Lane from the administrator and announced the acquisition of the club's trading name, history and memorabilia. Est.1885 had been assisted by the Forever Bury supporters' group and said they would soon announce "the rebranding and future role of Forever Bury and the transition of Est.1885". The statement also declared commitment towards "finding a consensual path with Bury AFC". Matt Pickup of Est.1885 said all parties had set a target of football returning to Gigg Lane by August 2022, in time for the 2022–23 season.

On 21 February 2022, it was confirmed that the owner of Gigg Lane—and of the Bury FC trading name—was the newly formed Gigg Lane Stadium Limited, a company limited by guarantee whose members were Gigg Lane Propco Limited and Bury Football Club Supporters' Society Limited, a registered society. This meant that, when a Bury FC team played at Gigg Lane in future, it would represent Gigg Lane Stadium Limited. Meanwhile, the original club incorporated in 1885—The Bury Football Club Company Ltd—remained in administration under the ownership of Steve Dale (its name was changed to CCFB Realisations 2022 Limited in April 2022 so that the new owner of the trading name could assume the original name; Dale was declared bankrupt in July 2022; Stewart Day was also declared bankrupt, in October 2022; and CCFB Realisations 2022 Limited was eventually dissolved in February 2025).

A Bury FC Supporters Society statement on 15 March 2022 said that the club's application to join the Northern Premier League had been rejected. While the FA and Bury MBC favoured a merger with Bury AFC (promoted to the NWCFL Premier Division on 26 March 2022), the statement recognised there were conflicting loyalties: "There are many supporters who have followed Bury AFC who are emotionally invested in the team and enjoying the success. We also have a significant number of supporters who did not choose this path and their feelings have to be seriously considered to avoid division and alienation." There were also FA restrictions about using the Bury FC name as football creditors to the old regime had not been paid.

=== Bury AFC: 2019–2023 ===
Although Bury FC were yet to enter administration and still continued to exist as a dormant club, in December 2019, a group of supporters resolved to form a phoenix club which they named Bury Association Football Club (Bury AFC). Some 300 Bury FC fans came forward to help and they formed a company registered as Bury Football Club (2019) Ltd (trading as Bury AFC). The club was fan-owned on the basis of one member one vote.

The new club immediately applied to the North West Counties Football League, the tenth tier of the English football league system, for membership in the 2020–21 season which was approved.

The 2020–21 season was the club's inaugural season. The FA Vase tie, played on 19 September, was the team's first competitive game, but they lost 2–1. The season was suspended in December due to COVID-19 restrictions, and was subsequently abandoned on 24 February 2021.

In the 2021–22 season, Bury AFC played in the North West Counties Football League Division One North. On 27 March 2022, before a crowd of over 1,800 people, a 4–0 home victory over St Helens Town secured the club's promotion to the NWCFL Premier Division as divisional champions. They finished the following season in 4th place on 83 points, four points from a play-off spot.

=== Merger ===
In May 2022, the Bury FC Supporters Society signed a memorandum of understanding (MoU) regarding the future of the club. Other signatories included Bury MBC, the Football Supporters' Association, Greater Manchester Combined Authority, Shakers Community Society on behalf of Bury AFC, and The Bury Football Club Company Ltd. In July 2022, Bury fans were asked to back a merger of the two principal supporters' groups (BFCSS and the Shakers Community Society) to bring Bury FC back to its "spiritual home with wider benefits for the whole community".

In October 2022, local football supporters were urged to vote in a poll, facilitated by the Football Supporters' Association, regarding a potential amalgamation of BFCSS (who owned Gigg Lane and the Bury FC name) and the Shakers Community Society (who owned the separate phoenix club, Bury AFC). Warned by the FSA that there was no "viable and sustainable alternative to the merger", the two groups both recommended their members to vote in favour. However, amid continuing tensions between the two groups, the proposals failed to reach the required 66% threshold from both societies; the Shakers Community Society voted 94% in favour while the BFCSS vote in favour fell short, at 63%. In late January 2023, it was reported that BFCSS had submitted a detailed proposal to the North West Counties Football League (NWCFL) to restart a professional football club at Gigg Lane, though some of the claims were disputed by the Shakers group.

The second merger vote was announced on 5 May 2023; members of both Bury FC and Bury AFC voted to merge the two clubs. On 5 June 2023, the club said that the FA had confirmed that the name "Bury Football Club" could be used in competition for the first time since August 2019, with the club competing in the Premier Division of the North West Counties League, the ninth tier of the English football pyramid.
