= Debtor =

Legal entity that owes debt to another entity

A debtor or debitor is a legal entity (legal person) that owes a debt to another entity. The entity may be an individual, a firm, a government, a company or other legal person. The counterparty is called a creditor. When the counterpart of this debt arrangement is a bank, the debtor is more often referred to as a borrower.

If X borrowed money from their bank, X is the debtor and the bank is the creditor. If X puts money in the bank, X is the creditor and the bank is the debtor.

It is not a crime to fail to pay a debt. Except in certain bankruptcy situations, debtors can choose to pay debts in any priority they choose. But if one fails to pay a debt, they have broken a contract or agreement between them and a creditor. Generally, most oral and written agreements for the repayment of consumer debt – debts for personal, family or household purposes secured primarily by a person's residence – are enforceable.

For the most part, debts that are business-related must be made in writing to be enforceable by law. If the written agreement requires the debtor to pay a specific amount of money, then the creditor does not have to accept any lesser amount, and should be paid in full.

Also, if there was no actual agreement but the creditor has proven to have loaned an amount of money, undertaken services or given the debtor a product, the debtor must then pay the creditor.

== The history of the term “debtor” ==
Anthropologist David Graeber suggests in Debt: The First 5000 Years that trading began with some form of credit namely the promise to pay later for already handed over goods. Because of this it can be said that debtors and creditors existed even before the implementation of coinage.

The term debtor comes from the word debt, which originated from the French word dette, which came from the Latin word debere, meaning to owe.

== Types of debtors ==
According to numbers released on March 31, 2013 by the U.S. Federal Reserve Board, household debt has passed the $11 trillion mark in the United States. Student loan debt will also soon pass the trillion-dollar mark.

There are many different types of debts which can cause the debtor and creditor relationship to arise. Some of these areas include:

- Bank account debt
- Trade debtors (most commonly used in accounting terms)
- Car loan debt
- Credit card debt
- Council tax debt
- Gambling debt
- Legal court debt
- Loan shark debt
- Overdraft debt
- Parking fines
- Payday loan debt
- Personal loan debt
- Phone debt
- Utility bill debts

Being a debtor is not restricted to an individual, as in business there is also company debt. Many companies heavily invest in accountancy and rely on insolvency solutions to prevent debt from being left aside.

== Legislation ==
In the United Kingdom, the Administration of Justice Act 1970 protects debtors from harassment intended to coerce payment of a debt.

== Default ==
Default occurs when the debtor has not met its legal obligations according to the debt contract, e.g.- it has not made a scheduled payment, or has violated a covenant in the debt contract. Default may occur if the debtor is either unwilling or unable to pay its debt. This can occur with all debt obligations including bonds, mortgages, loans, and promissory notes.

If the debt owed becomes beyond the possibility of repayment, the debtor faces insolvency or bankruptcy; in the United Kingdom and some states of the United States until the mid-19th century, debtors could be imprisoned in debtor's prisons, while in some countries such as Greece debtors are still imprisoned.

== Debtor in Bankruptcy and Individual Voluntary Arrangements ==
An Individual Voluntary Arrangement is a legally binding arrangement supervised by a licensed Insolvency Practitioner, the purpose of which is to enable an individual, sole trader or Partner ("the Debtor") to reach a compromise with his creditors and avoid the consequences of bankruptcy. The compromise should offer a larger repayment towards the creditor's debt than could otherwise be expected were the Debtor to be made bankrupt. This is often facilitated by the Debtor making contributions to the arrangement from his income over a designated period or from a third party contribution or other sources that would not ordinarily be available to a Trustee in Bankruptcy.

== Other uses ==
In the Latin version of the Lord's Prayer, the words Et dimitte nobis debita nostra/Sicut et nos dimittimus debitoribus nostris, the words Debtor and Debt are sometimes translated as Sinner and Sin. This particular understanding of sin, as a form of debt that humanity inherits, is related to the soteriological theory of substitutionary atonement, which states that Jesus died on the cross as a propitiation, or substitute, for sinners.

== See also ==
- Administration order
- Administrative receivership
- Bankruptcy
- Creditor's rights
- Debtors' prison
- Interest expense
- Liquidation
- Simplified Individual Voluntary Arrangement
- Protected Trust Deed (only available in Scotland)
