= Simplified individual voluntary arrangement =

In the United Kingdom, a simplified IVA (SIVA) was a proposed new form of IVA (individual voluntary arrangement), which would have been a formal alternative of clearing debt without being declared bankrupt.

== Tiers ==
The simplified IVA (SIVA) was likely to have been two tiers:

- Tier 1 would have an upper limit of £25–30,000, and
- Tier 2 would have an upper limit of £75,000.

The approval of an SIVA was likely to have been based on a simple majority instead of the existing 75%. The government decided not to proceed with the proposals for SIVA in November 2008.

== Withdrawal ==
In December 2008 The plans announced to modify the Insolvency Act 1986 by introducing SIVAs (Simplified IVA) have been withdrawn from the regulatory marketplace. The association said that the "successful operation of the IVA Protocol has resulted in many of the desired improvements in the IVA marketplace being implemented without the need for further insolvency legislation".

== See also ==
- Individual voluntary arrangement
- Company voluntary arrangement
