= Insolvency Practitioners Association =

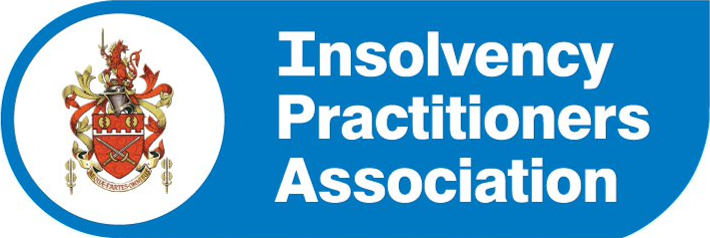
- Formation: 1961
- Founded at: United Kingdom
- Legal status: Recognised Professional Body (RPB)
- Headquarters: London, UK
- President: Louise Brittain
- Vice-President: Amanda Wade
- Deputy Vice-President: Russell Payne
- Chief Executive: Marcial Boo
- Website: https://insolvency-practitioners.org.uk

The Insolvency Practitioners Association (IPA) is a Recognised Professional Body (RPB) for the UK insolvency profession, responsible for licensing and regulation of its Insolvency Practitioner members under insolvency and Anti-Money Laundering (AML) legislation. It is the only such RPB that focuses solely on insolvency. The IPA is also acts as a membership organisation and offers training and qualifications for insolvency practitioners and those in insolvency-related work.

== History ==
The IPA was formed in 1961 as a discussion group of accountants specialising in insolvency. It was incorporated under its present name in 1973.

The Insolvency Act 1986 brought in a statutory authorisation regime for practitioners through seven RPBs, of which the IPA was designated one. There are now four RPBs in the UK.

Its members act as trustees in bankruptcy, nominees and supervisors of individual voluntary arrangements, liquidators, administrators and administrative receivers of companies.

== Governance ==
The Insolvency Service, an executive agency of the UK Government, is the oversight regulator of the insolvency profession. It has overall responsibility on behalf of the Secretary of State for Business and Trade for ensuring that the activities of the RPBs that authorise and licence insolvency practitioners are in line with regulatory objectives set out in part 13 of the Insolvency Act 1986.

These objectives include a system of regulating Insolvency Practitioners which promotes fair and consistent outcomes, maximises returns to creditors and protects and promotes the public interest. As part of its oversight activity, the Insolvency Service undertakes monitoring visits to the RPBs using a risk-based approach to assess their extent and frequency.

The IPA is a Professional Body Supervisor (PBS), responsible for monitoring its members’ compliance with the Money Laundering Regulations. The Office for Professional Body Anti- Money Laundering Supervision (OPBAS) is part of the Financial Conduct Authority (FCA) and is responsible for supervising the IPA and the other PBSs.

== Membership of the IPA ==
The IPA has around 1,500 members. The IPA recently widened access to affiliate membership (AIPA) and introduced a new category of affiliate firm membership for those practices, businesses and organisations which are involved in insolvency related work.

== Insolvency examinations ==
The IPA introduced the Certificate of Proficiency in Insolvency (CPI) examination in 1995. More recently, with the growth of personal insolvency and the increasing range of statutory and non-statutory debt relief/repayment solutions, the Certificate of Proficiency in Personal Insolvency (CPPI) was introduced.

== Insolvency Practitioners' Handbook ==
The IPA publishes an annual Insolvency Practitioners' Handbook which draws together the Code of Ethics, Statements of Insolvency Practice (SIPs) and other regulatory guidance to which Insolvency Practitioners are expected to adhere.

== Volume Provider Regulation Scheme ==
The IPA's Volume Provider Regulation (VPR) Scheme was finalised in late 2018 and came into effect on 1 January 2019. It was created as a direct response to the rapid development of the Individual Voluntary Arrangement (IVA) market. The new approach to regulation was designed to provide assurance that the market was functioning correctly. The IPA implemented the Scheme with the co-operation of volume IVA providers (those who conducted more than 2% of the IVA market at the time).

In July 2019, the Scheme was extended to include Scottish Protected Trust Deeds (PTDs) administered at volume (defined as controlling more than 10% of the PTD market at the time).

During 2023 the definition of volume providers was reviewed with a view to moving away from a percentage basis. The Insolvency Service issued revised guidance which came into effect on 2 October 2023.

A volume provider is now defined by the Insolvency Service as an Insolvency Practitioner or an entity which has at any time within the previous 12 months been responsible for the administration of:

- 1,000 or more cases in which one or more person(s) has acted as nominee in relation to an IVA, and/or
- 5,000 or more cases in which one or more person(s) has acted as supervisor in relation to an IVA, and/or
- 2,000 or more cases in which one or more person(s) has acted as trustee in relation to a trust deed (in Scotland) whether or not the trust deed is protected.
