= Insolvency Service =

Executive agency in the United Kingdom

The Insolvency Service

Agency overview
- Type: Executive agency
- Jurisdiction: United Kingdom
- Employees: 1,800
- Agency executive: Duncan Beach, Chief Executive
- Parent department: Department for Business and Trade
- Website: gov.uk/insolvency-service

The Insolvency Service is a British government executive agency of the Department for Business and Trade with headquarters in London. It has around 1,800 staff, operating from 11 locations across the UK.

The Insolvency Service administers compulsory company liquidations and personal bankruptcies and deals with misconduct through investigation of companies and enforcement. It also makes redundancy payments in cases where a company is insolvent.

== History ==
The Insolvency Service was established under a statutory framework – mainly the Insolvency Act 1986, the Insolvency Act 2000, the Company Directors Disqualification Act 1986 and the Employment Rights Act 1996. Insolvency Service staff were based across the UK in a network of 38 official receiver offices throughout England and Wales.

In April 2003, the Redundancy Payments Service transferred to the Insolvency Service. This enabled a joined-up approach to company failure and any consequential redundancies to be had and this is demonstrated on a frequent basis.

On 1 April 2006, Companies Investigation Branch of BERR transferred to the service. The new debt relief orders which came into force on 6 April 2009 under the Tribunals, Courts and Enforcement Act 2007 are also undertaken by the service.

== Responsibilities ==
The Insolvency Service is responsible for authorising and regulating the insolvency profession. They:

- administer bankruptcies and debt relief orders
- look into the affairs of companies in liquidation, making reports of any director misconduct
- investigate trading companies and take action to wind them up or disqualify the directors if there is evidence of misconduct
- investigate the conduct of directors of companies subject to formal insolvency proceedings, or that have been dissolved
- act as trustee or liquidator where no private sector insolvency practitioner is in place
- issue redundancy payments from the National Insurance Fund
- work to disqualify unfit company directors
- deal with bankruptcy and debt relief restrictions orders and undertakings
- act as a impartial source of information for the public on insolvency and redundancy matters
- advise DBT ministers and other government departments and agencies on insolvency and redundancy related issues
- investigate and prosecute breaches of company and insolvency legislation and other criminal offences on behalf of DBT

== Governance ==
The Agency Chief Executive is the Agency Accounting Officer and is responsible for the day-to-day running of the Service.

The Insolvency Service Board is responsible for the long-term success of the agency. This includes:

- setting strategic aims and objectives
- making sure that leadership and resources are in place to meet these aims
- challenging and supporting management performance
- reporting to DBT

== See also ==
- Administration order
- Administrative receivership
- Bankruptcy
- Liquidation
- Protected trust deed (only available in Scotland)
- Simplified individual voluntary arrangement
- United States Trustee Program
