= Insolvency practitioner =

In the United Kingdom, only an authorised or licensed insolvency practitioner (IP) may be appointed in relation to formal insolvency procedures.

Quite often IPs have an accountancy background. A few active practitioners are lawyers, but it is not necessary to be qualified as either, as since 1986 there has been a direct entry route to the profession.

== Insolvency is a regulated profession ==
In the UK, only a licensed insolvency practitioner can be appointed in relation to formal insolvency procedures for individuals and businesses. Insolvency practitioners are licensed to advise on, and undertake appointments in, all formal insolvency procedures. In the UK, insolvency practitioners are subject to oversight and inspection by their recognised professional body. Insolvency is a regulated profession under the Insolvency Act 1986 and anyone who wishes to practise as an IP needs to pass the JIEB exams; a set of three examination papers set by the Joint Insolvency Examination Board (JIEB). The exams are held once a year, usually in November, and each last 3.5 hours. Once the exams have been passed, it is necessary to meet the authorising body's insolvency experience requirements. Licences are issued by the following recognised professional bodies:

- Insolvency Practitioners Association
- Institute of Chartered Accountants in England & Wales
- Institute of Chartered Accountants of Scotland

As a "competent authority" under the Insolvency Act 1986, the Secretary of State for Business and Trade (DBT) – and, for Northern Ireland, the Department of Enterprise, Trade and Investment – also authorises IPs. The Insolvency Service, an executive agency of DBT, oversees insolvency regulation in Great Britain and each authorising body is represented on the Joint Insolvency Committee, which aims to develop and maintain insolvency standards and best practice guidance, largely by means of Statements of Insolvency Practice (SIPs).

There are currently around 1,500 licensed insolvency practitioners in the United Kingdom, not all of whom take appointments – various lawyers hold licences but rarely use them to take appointments, preferring to advise other practitioners.

== Trade body ==
The Association of Business Recovery Professionals is the leading professional association for insolvency, business recovery and turnaround specialists in the UK. Known by its brand name ‘R3’, it promotes best practices for professionals working with financially troubled individuals and businesses.

== Procedures requiring an insolvency practitioner ==
Under UK law, unless an official receiver already holds office, the following types of formal insolvency procedure must be dealt with by a licensed insolvency practitioner:

- Administrations
- Administrative receiverships
- Bankruptcy
- Company voluntary arrangements
- Compulsory liquidations
- Creditors' voluntary liquidations
- Deeds of arrangement
- Individual voluntary arrangements
- Lump-sum IVAs
- Section 110 reconstruction
- Members' voluntary liquidations
- Protected trust deeds (only available in Scotland)

== See also ==
- Insolvency Act 1986
- Insolvency Service
