= Companies Investigation Branch =

The Companies Investigation Branch (or CIB) was part of the United Kingdom's Department for Business, Enterprise and Regulatory Reform.

Headed by the Inspector of Companies, CIB exercises on behalf of the Secretary of State for Business, Enterprise and Regulatory Reform the statutory powers of enquiry under the Companies Act 1985 and other legislation. These powers are exercisable throughout Great Britain, but not in Northern Ireland. Information obtained can be passed to other regulators for action; can result in the courts being petitioned to wind up the company; can result in an application being made to the courts for individuals to be disqualified from acting as a director of, or in the management of, a company; or can be used in a criminal prosecution of a company or its officers.

Civil servants within CIB carry out most investigations, although occasionally qualified individuals in the private sector are used – usually as a means of dealing with varying work loads, but sometimes because special expertise is required.

On 1 April 2006 CIB became part of the Insolvency Service, an Executive Agency of the Department of Trade and Industry, though its functions are unchanged.
