= StepChange =

British debt counselling organization

StepChange Debt Charity
- Founded: 1993
- Founder: Vic Ware, Malcolm Hurlston
- Region served: United Kingdom
- Services: Debt advice and support
- Employees: 1,150
- Website: stepchange.org
- Formerly called: Consumer Credit Counselling Service

StepChange Debt Charity, formerly the Consumer Credit Counselling Service (CCCS), is the trading name of the Foundation for Credit Counselling, and is a debt counselling charity in the United Kingdom. The organisation offers free debt advise, money management and can be contacted through its freephone telephone helpline or online through its online debt advice tool. In 2022, over 500,000 people contacted the charity for help. The charity also campaigns to change policies and practices that trap people in problem debt.

Its current Chair is Lesley Titcomb CBE. The Chief Executive of the charity is Vikki Brownridge who took over from Phil Andrew in May 2023.

== Services ==
StepChange provides debt advice to clients online and via telephone. Clients have their financial situation evaluated, and are recommended debt solutions, including insolvency options, bankruptcy, individual voluntary arrangements, or debt management plans.

Since early 2021 the charity has also provided eligible clients opportunity to enter “Breathing Space”, allowing them to receive 60 days' respite from interest, fees, and court action to reduce stress and give them time to sort out a debt solution.

StepChange Scotland, which operates under the differing Scottish system, provides specific services to Scottish clients. StepChange Scotland is an approved organisation for setting up debt payment plans through the Debt Arrangement Scheme (DAS).

== History ==
The charity was founded in 1993 when Vic Ware OBE and Malcolm Hurlston introduced the Consumer Credit Counselling Service to the UK via a pilot scheme based in Leeds.

The introduction of debt counselling over the telephone proved to be a success and the charity expanded throughout the late 1990s and early 2000s.

The charity has continued to grow in recent years. In 2007 it established a non-profit individual voluntary arrangement service and in 2010 launched a free equity release advice service.

On 5 November 2012 the charity rebranded as StepChange Debt Charity.

In 2017 the charity was contacted by almost 620,000 people seeking debt help and delivered over 357,000 detailed debt advice sessions. By 2019 the number getting in contact had risen to 635,000, but in 2020 the charity saw a reduced number of only 500,000 people getting in touch, which it attributes to the support measures put in place by the British government and credit industry in the wake of the Covid-19 pandemic.

The charity's head office is in Leeds, England. There are also centres in the English municipalities of Newcastle, Birmingham, Chester, Scotland's largest city of Glasgow, and the Welsh capital of Cardiff. The charity also has an office in London.

== Policy work ==
As well as providing advice, the organisation also campaigns for change to reduce the incidence of problem debt, and successfully worked with other charities to influence the Government to introduce a statutory a "Breathing Space" debt respite scheme. Other campaigning work on overdrafts, credit cards, and high cost credit has resulted in policy changes from the Financial Conduct Authority, and the charity continues to press for the reform of bailiff legislation as part of the Taking Control coalition of charities.

== Funding ==
StepChange Debt Charity is funded mostly by voluntary donations from creditors as well as allocated Government funding through the Money and Pensions Service, and works with over 900 partner organisations. The charity also accepts donations from the general public. In 2020, the charity received income of £60.6m and had operating costs of £63.4m, including a £3.9m increase in staff costs, reflecting increased colleague number during the year. These costs also reflect the improvements made after a decade, to colleague remuneration and benefits under the charity’s Total Reward strategy.
