= Insolvency =

State of being unable to pay one's debts

In accounting, insolvency is the state of being unable to pay the debts, by a person or company (debtor), at maturity; those in a state of insolvency are said to be insolvent. There are two forms: cash-flow insolvency and balance-sheet insolvency.

Cash-flow insolvency is a condition in which a person or company has enough assets to pay what is owed, but does not have the appropriate form of payment. For example, a person may own a large house and a valuable car, but not have enough liquid assets to pay a debt when it falls due. Cash-flow insolvency can usually be resolved by negotiation. For example, the bill collector may wait until the car is sold and the debtor agrees to pay a penalty.

In balance-sheet insolvency, a person or company does not have enough assets to pay all of their debts. The person or company might enter bankruptcy, but not necessarily. Once a loss is accepted by all parties, negotiation is often able to resolve the situation without bankruptcy. A company that is balance-sheet insolvent may still have enough cash to pay its next bill on time. However, most laws will not let the company pay that bill unless it will directly help all their creditors. For example, an insolvent farmer may be allowed to hire people to help harvest the crop, because not harvesting and selling the crop would be even worse for his creditors.

It has been suggested that the speaker or writer should either say technical insolvency or actual insolvency in order to always be clear – where technical insolvency is a synonym for balance sheet insolvency, which means that its liabilities are greater than its assets, and actual insolvency is a synonym for the first definition of insolvency ("Insolvency is the inability of a debtor to pay their debt."). While technical insolvency is a synonym for balance-sheet insolvency, cash-flow insolvency and actual insolvency are not synonyms. The term "cash-flow insolvent" carries a strong (but perhaps not absolute) connotation that the debtor is balance-sheet solvent, whereas the term "actually insolvent" does not.

== Technical definitions ==
Cash-flow insolvency involves a lack of liquidity to pay debts as they fall due.

Balance sheet insolvency involves having negative net assets—where liabilities exceed assets. Insolvency is not a synonym for bankruptcy, which is a determination of insolvency made by a court of law with resulting legal orders intended to resolve the insolvency.

Accounting insolvency happens when total liabilities exceed total assets (negative net worth).

== Consequences ==
The principal focus of modern insolvency legislation and business debt restructuring practices no longer rests on the liquidation and elimination of insolvent entities but on the remodeling of the financial and organizational structure of debtors experiencing financial distress so as to permit the rehabilitation and continuation of their business. This is known as business turnaround or business recovery. Implementing a business turnaround may take many forms, including keep and restructure, sale as a going concern, or wind-down and exit. In some jurisdictions, it is an offence under the insolvency laws for a corporation to continue in business while insolvent. In others (like the United States with its Chapter 11 provisions), the business may continue under a declared protective arrangement while alternative options to achieve recovery are worked out. Increasingly, legislatures have favored alternatives to winding up companies for good.

It can be, in several jurisdictions, grounds for a civil action or even an offence to continue to pay some creditors in preference to other creditors once a state of insolvency is reached.

== Debt restructuring ==
Debt restructurings are typically handled by professional insolvency and restructuring practitioners, and are usually less expensive and a preferable alternative to bankruptcy.

Debt restructuring is a process that allows a private or public company - or a sovereign entity - facing cash flow problems and financial distress, to reduce and renegotiate its delinquent debts in order to improve or restore liquidity and rehabilitate so that it can continue its operations.

== Government debt ==
Although the term "bankrupt" may be used referring to a government, sovereign states do not go bankrupt. This is so because bankruptcy is governed by national law; there exists no domestic entity to take over such a government and distribute assets to creditors, only other countries who are able and willing to act upon the interests of their creditors. This is exemplified heavily throughout the Colonial Era, as well as the political dynamics of contemporary neocolonialism in Africa. Infamous examples appear throughout Chinese history, throughout which European capital was catylitic to conflicts that often resulted in heavy concessions, such as treaty ports. This period is historiographically known as the Century of Humiliation.

Governments can be insolvent in terms of not having money to pay obligations when they are due. If a government does not meet an obligation, it is in default. As governments are sovereign entities, creditors who hold debt of the government cannot easily seize the assets of the government to re-pay the debt (though Vulture funds often find ways to do so). The recourse for the creditor is to request to be repaid at least some of what is owed. However, in most cases, debt in default is refinanced by further borrowing or monetized by issuing more currency (which typically results in inflation or hyperinflation).

== Law ==
Insolvency regimes around the world have evolved in very different ways, with laws focusing on different strategies for dealing with the insolvent. The outcome of an insolvent restructuring can be very different depending on the laws of the state in which the insolvency proceeding is run, and in many cases, different stakeholders in a company may hold the advantage in different jurisdictions. In many jurisdictions, following the 2008 Global Financial Crisis, financial institution-specific insolvency regimes—namely bank resolution and recovery proceedings—were implemented to address the particular challenges of insolvency in the financial sector.

=== Anguilla ===
In Anguilla, the insolvency of individuals is regulated under the Bankruptcy Act (Cap B.15) and corporate insolvency is governed by the Bankruptcy Act (Cap B.15) or the Companies Act (Cap C.65).

=== Australia ===
In Australia, corporate insolvency is governed by the Corporations Act 2001 (Cth). Companies can be put into Voluntary Administration, Creditors Voluntary Liquidation, and Court Liquidation. Secured creditors with registered charges are able to appoint Receivers and Receivers & Managers depending on their charge.

=== British Virgin Islands ===
In the British Virgin Islands, insolvency law is primarily codified in the Insolvency Act, 2003 and the Insolvency Rules, 2005.

=== Canada ===
In Canada, bankruptcy and insolvency are generally regulated by the Bankruptcy and Insolvency Act. An alternative regime is available to larger companies (or affiliated groups) under the Companies' Creditors Arrangement Act, where total debts exceed CA$5 million.

=== Germany ===
In Germany, insolvency proceedings, both for companies and for natural persons, are regulated by the Insolvency Act (Insolvenzordnung), in effect since 1999 but with significant changes in 2012. The goal of insolvency law is the equal and best satisfaction of creditors.

If the interests of creditors are respected, insolvent companies are offered different ways to restructure their businesses, for example by implementing an 'insolvency plan' (Insolvenzplan). While regular insolvency proceedings are led by a court-appointed insolvency administrator, 'debtor-in-possession' proceedings are common since the legislative changes in 2012.

For natural persons, the Verbraucherinsolvenzverfahren (literally "insolvency proceeding for individual consumers") allows discharge of all debts after three years, if certain conditions are met.

=== Hong Kong ===
In Hong Kong, insolvency is primarily governed by the Companies (Winding Up and Miscellaneous Provisions) Ordinance (Cap 32) and the Companies (Winding Up) Rules (Cap 32H).

=== India ===
In India, bankruptcy and insolvency are generally regulated by the Insolvency and Bankruptcy Code 2016. The Insolvency and Bankruptcy Board of India (IBBI) is the regulator for overseeing insolvency proceedings and entities like Insolvency Professional Agencies (IPA), Insolvency Professionals (IP) and Information Utilities (IU) in India.

Insolvent citizens may not contest/be appointed for any public office, nor may they participate in govt exams. They are also not allowed to emigrate out.

=== Iran ===
Iranian government Tax, finance and bankruptcy administration handles corporations. First insolvency law was adopted 1935. Those who claim inability are temporary exempt from debt payment.

=== Ireland ===
In Ireland, insolvency is governed by the Companies Act 2014.

=== Russia ===
In Russia, insolvency law is governed by Federal Law No. 127-FZ "On Insolvency (Bankruptcy)" and Federal Law No. 40-FZ "On Insolvency (Bankruptcy) of Credit Institutions".

=== South Africa ===
In South Africa, owners of businesses that had at any stage traded insolvently (i.e. that had a balance-sheet insolvency) become personally liable for the business's debts. Trading insolvently is often regarded as normal business practice in South Africa, as long as the business is able to fulfill its debt obligations when they fall due.

=== Switzerland ===
Under Swiss law, insolvency or foreclosure may lead to the seizure and auctioning off of assets (generally in the case of private individuals) or to bankruptcy proceedings (generally in the case of registered commercial entities).

=== Turkey ===
Turkish insolvency law is regulated by Enforcement and Bankruptcy Law (Code No: 2004, Original Name: İcra ve İflas Kanunu). The main concept of the insolvency law is very similar to Swiss and German insolvency laws. Enforcement methods are realizing pledged property, seizure of assets and bankruptcy.

=== United Kingdom ===
==== Insolvency Act 1986 ====
In the United Kingdom, the term bankruptcy is reserved for individuals. Insolvency is defined both in terms of cash flow and in terms of balance sheet in the UK Insolvency Act 1986, Section 123, which reads in part:

123.-(1) A company is deemed unable to pay its debts ---
(a) if a creditor (by assignment or otherwise) to whom the company is indebted in a sum exceeding £750 then due has served on the company, by leaving it at the company's registered office, a written demand (in the prescribed form) requiring the company to pay the sum so due and the company has for 3 weeks thereafter neglected to pay the sum or to secure or compound for it to the reasonable satisfaction of the creditor,... (2) A company is also deemed unable to pay its debts if it is proved to the satisfaction of the court that the value of the company's assets is less than the amount of its liabilities, taking into account its contingent and prospective liabilities...

— Insolvency Act 1986, Section 123 (Part IV, Chapter VI), p. 68.

A company which is insolvent may be put into liquidation (sometimes referred to as winding-up). The directors and shareholders can instigate the liquidation process without court involvement by a shareholder resolution and the appointment of a licensed Insolvency Practitioner as liquidator. However, the liquidation will not be effective legally without the convening of a meeting of creditors who have the opportunity to appoint a liquidator of their own choice. This process is known as creditors voluntary liquidation (CVL), as opposed to members voluntary liquidation (MVL) which is for solvent companies. Alternatively, a creditor can petition the court for a winding-up order which, if granted, will place the company into what is called compulsory liquidation or winding up by the court. The liquidator realises the assets of the company and distributes funds realised to creditors according to their priorities, after the deduction of costs. In the case of Sole Trader Insolvency, the insolvency options include Individual Voluntary Arrangements and Bankruptcy.

==== Procedures ====
It can be a civil and even a criminal offence for directors to allow a company to continue to trade whilst insolvent. However, two new insolvency procedures were introduced by the Insolvency Act 1986 which aim to provide time for the rescue of a company or, at least, its business. These are Administration and Company Voluntary Arrangement:

- Administration is a procedure to protect a company from its creditors in order for it to be able to make significant operational changes or restructuring so that it could continue as a going concern, or at least in order to achieve a better outcome for creditors than via liquidation. In contrast to Chapter 11 in the US where the directors remain in control throughout that restructuring process, in the UK an Administrator is appointed who must be a licensed Insolvency Practitioner to manage the company's affairs to protect the creditors of the insolvent company and balance their respective interests. Unless the company itself is saved by this process, the company is subsequently put into liquidation to distribute the remaining funds.
- A Company Voluntary Arrangement (CVA) is a legal agreement between the company and its creditors, based on paying a fixed amount lower than the outstanding actual debt. These are normally based on a monthly payment, and at the end of the agreed term the remaining debt is written-off. The CVA is managed by a Supervisor who must be a licensed Insolvency Practitioner. If the CVA fails, the company is usually put into liquidation.

One particular type of Administration that is becoming more common is called pre pack administration (more information under administration (law)). In this process, immediately after appointment the administrator completes a pre-arranged sale of the company's business, often to its directors or owners. The process can be seen as controversial because the creditors do not have the opportunity to vote against the sale. The rationale behind the device is that the swift sale of the business may be necessary or of benefit to enable a best price to be achieved. If the sale was delayed, creditors would ultimately lose out because the price obtainable for the assets would be reduced.

==== Receivership ====
In addition to the above-mentioned corporate insolvency procedures, a creditor holding security over an asset of the company may have the power to appoint an insolvency practitioner as administrative receiver or, in Scotland, receiver. The process, latterly known as administrative receivership or, in Scotland, receivership, has existed for many years and has often resulted in a successful rescue of a company's business via a sale, but not of the company itself. Since the introduction of the collective insolvency procedure of Administration in 1986, the legislators have decided to set a shelf life on the administrative receivership or, in Scotland, receivership procedure and it is no longer possible to appoint an administrative receiver or, in Scotland, receiver under security created after 15 September 2003.

In individual cases the bankruptcy estate is dealt by an official receiver, appointed by the court. In some cases the file is transferred to RTLU (OR Regional Trustee Liquidator Unit) that will assess your assets and income to see if you can contribute towards paying costs of bankruptcy or even discharge part of your debts.

=== United States ===
Under the Uniform Commercial Code, a person is considered to be insolvent when the party has ceased to pay its debts in the ordinary course of business, or cannot pay its debts as they become due, or is insolvent within the meaning of the Bankruptcy Code. This is important because certain rights under the code may be invoked against an insolvent party which are otherwise unavailable.

The United States has established an insolvency regime which aims to protect the insolvent individual or company from the creditors and balance their respective interests. For example, see Chapter 11, Title 11, United States Code. However, some state courts have begun to find individual corporate officers and directors liable for driving a company deeper into bankruptcy, under the legal theory of "deepening insolvency".

In determining whether a gift or a payment to a creditor is an unlawful preference, the date of the insolvency, rather than the date of the legally declared bankruptcy, will usually be the primary consideration.

== See also ==
- Solvency
