= Financial distress =

State of being unable to repay the creditors of a company

Financial distress is a term in corporate finance used to indicate a condition when promises to creditors of a company are broken or honored with difficulty. If financial distress cannot be relieved, it can lead to bankruptcy. Financial distress is usually associated with some costs to the company; these are known as costs of financial distress.

== Cost ==
A common example of a cost of financial distress is bankruptcy costs. These direct costs include auditors' fees, legal fees, management fees and other payments. Cost of financial distress can occur even if bankruptcy is avoided (indirect costs).

Financial distress in companies requires management attention and might lead to reduced attention on the operations of the company. Similarly liquidity, profitability, asset productivity, activity, and solvency is major cause of corporate financial distress.

Another source of indirect costs of financial distress are higher costs of capital as usually banks increase the interest rates if a state of financial distress occurs. Debt covenants can also be adjusted to provide borrower flexibility to avoid default or bankruptcy. However, these modifications can also result in greater financing costs, increased lender oversight, which can constrain the borrower's operational and financial flexibility.

== Options for relieving financial distress ==
If high debt burden is the cause of financial distress, the company can undergo a debt restructuring. If operational issues are the reason for the distress, the company can negotiate a payment holiday with its creditors, while improving operational efficiency so as to be able to service its debt. If the latter improvements are insufficient, the company may engage in the more extensive turnaround management. See Valuation (finance) § Valuation of a suffering company for discussion. Additionally, a company may seek out alternative sources of capital via asset sales or seeking alternative funding through private equity, hedge funds, or other investors.
