= Company voluntary arrangement =

Voluntary agreement of a company with its business creditors

Under UK insolvency law an insolvent company can enter into a company voluntary arrangement (CVA). The CVA is a form of composition, similar to the personal IVA (individual voluntary arrangement), where an insolvency procedure allows a company with debt problems or that is insolvent to reach a voluntary agreement with its business creditors regarding repayment of all, or part of its corporate debts over an agreed period of time. The application for a CVA can be made by the agreement of all directors of the company, the legal administrators of the company, or the appointed company liquidator.

== Implementation ==
A company voluntary arrangement can only be implemented by an insolvency practitioner (IP), who will draft a proposal for the creditors. A meeting of creditors is held to see if the CVA is accepted. As long as 75% (by debt value) of the creditors who vote agree, then the CVA is accepted. All the company creditors are then bound to the terms of the proposal whether or not they voted. Creditors are also unable to commence further legal action as long as the terms are adhered to, and existing legal action such as a winding-up order ceases.

During the CVA, payments are made in a single monthly amount paid to the insolvency practitioner. The fees charged by the insolvency practitioner will be deducted from these payments. The company is not required to fund any further costs. Companies House will register the fact the company is entering into a CVA and there will be a recording of it on its credit file.

== Overview ==
In order to initiate a CVA, a specific process must be followed to assess the company's viability for the arrangement and to establish a business recovery plan. The CVA process typically includes the following steps:

1. Contact with an Insolvency Practitioner (IP): The company engages an IP to assess its financial situation and determine the suitability of a CVA. This initial consultation is usually free of charge.
2. Information gathering: If a CVA is deemed the best course of action, the IP collects information and drafts a proposal to present to unsecured creditors. This proposal includes details about the company's financial difficulties, assets, liabilities, projected payments, and the expected duration of the CVA.
3. Review of the CVA proposal: The company's directors review the CVA proposal and make necessary revisions. Once finalized, the proposal is sent to all creditors and shareholders.
4. CVA moratorium (optional): To alleviate creditor pressure and halt legal action, the company may apply for a CVA moratorium. Obtaining a CVA moratorium is rare but can be useful for insolvency practitioners.
5. Informal agreement with Unsecured Creditors (Alternative): Instead of a CVA moratorium, an informal agreement with unsecured creditors may be established to prevent legal action. Insolvency practitioners often maintain communication with creditors to support ongoing business activities and facilitate repayments.
6. Creditors' meeting: Creditors and shareholders are given at least 14 days' notice before a meeting where they can vote on the CVA proposal. A minimum of 75% approval is required to pass the proposal, and it may need to be revised if not accepted. A second creditors' vote may be held, excluding connected creditors, where a 50% approval is needed for approval.
7. Commencement of the CVA: Upon approval, the CVA begins, with agreed-upon monthly payments collected by the IP and distributed to creditors on a pro-rata basis. The CVA terms are legally binding, and creditors cannot pursue legal action if the agreement is adhered to.
8. End of the agreement: The CVA concludes at the end of the agreed term if all payments are made and the proposal conditions are met. Outstanding debt may be written off, or the CVA could be extended, depending on circumstances. Creditors may receive varying percentages of their owed amounts, ranging from 1p to 100p in the pound.

== Potential benefits ==
Companies can benefit from a CVA in numerous ways:

- Improves cash flow, quickly.
- Stops pressure from tax while the CVA is being prepared.
- Stops a winding-up petition and gets it adjourned.
- Can rapidly cut costs.
- Can terminate employment, leases and onerous supply contracts.
- Terminates property lease obligations.
- Terminates directors’ and/or managers’ contracts.
- Removes employees with no redundancy payments or lieu-of-notice costs.
- Terminates onerous customer/supplier contracts.
- Board and shareholders generally remain in control of the company.
- Has much lower costs than administration and is not publicly announced like administration is.
- Is a good deal for creditors as they retain the customer and receive some of their debt back over time.

== Role of directors ==
Within a CVA, directors retain control of the business.

Directors have a legal duty to act properly and responsibly and to prioritise the interests of their creditors. The risks of liquidating a business may include disqualification from acting as a director of other companies and also personal reputation as a director. In an extreme case directors can be found personally liable to contribute towards the shortfall in payments to creditors. However, as a company voluntary arrangement is in the best interests of creditors, there is no investigation into the director's conduct.

Under a company voluntary arrangement, directors are not personally liable for the company's debts, unless they have given a personal guarantee. Even if a director has provided a guarantee, a CVA will mean a director is only liable if the company cannot pay and by continuing in business there is a retained source of income.

== Legal impact ==
In the High Court case of Mead General Building Ltd v Dartmoor Properties Ltd, [2009] EWHC 200, Mead were the subject of a CVA, in part because Dartmoor had not paid them some monies due. An adjudicator, appointed to direct how the dispute between the companies should be addressed temporarily, decided that Dartmoor should pay Mead £350,000 of outstanding debt. Dartmoor challenged the adjudicator's decision, declined to pay, and argued that the fact that Mead had a CVA in place jeopardised their financial position if they paid the adjudicated amount. The court was willing to enforce the adjudicator's decision, but also considered whether the CVA should affect the ruling. On the facts of this particular case, the CVA, the IP's assessment and the support of Mead's creditors led the court to believe that Mead could trade its way out of their financial difficulties, and therefore that the adjudicator's award should be enforced.

== See also ==
- UK company law
- US insolvency law
