= Bankruptcy =

Legal status for relief from debts

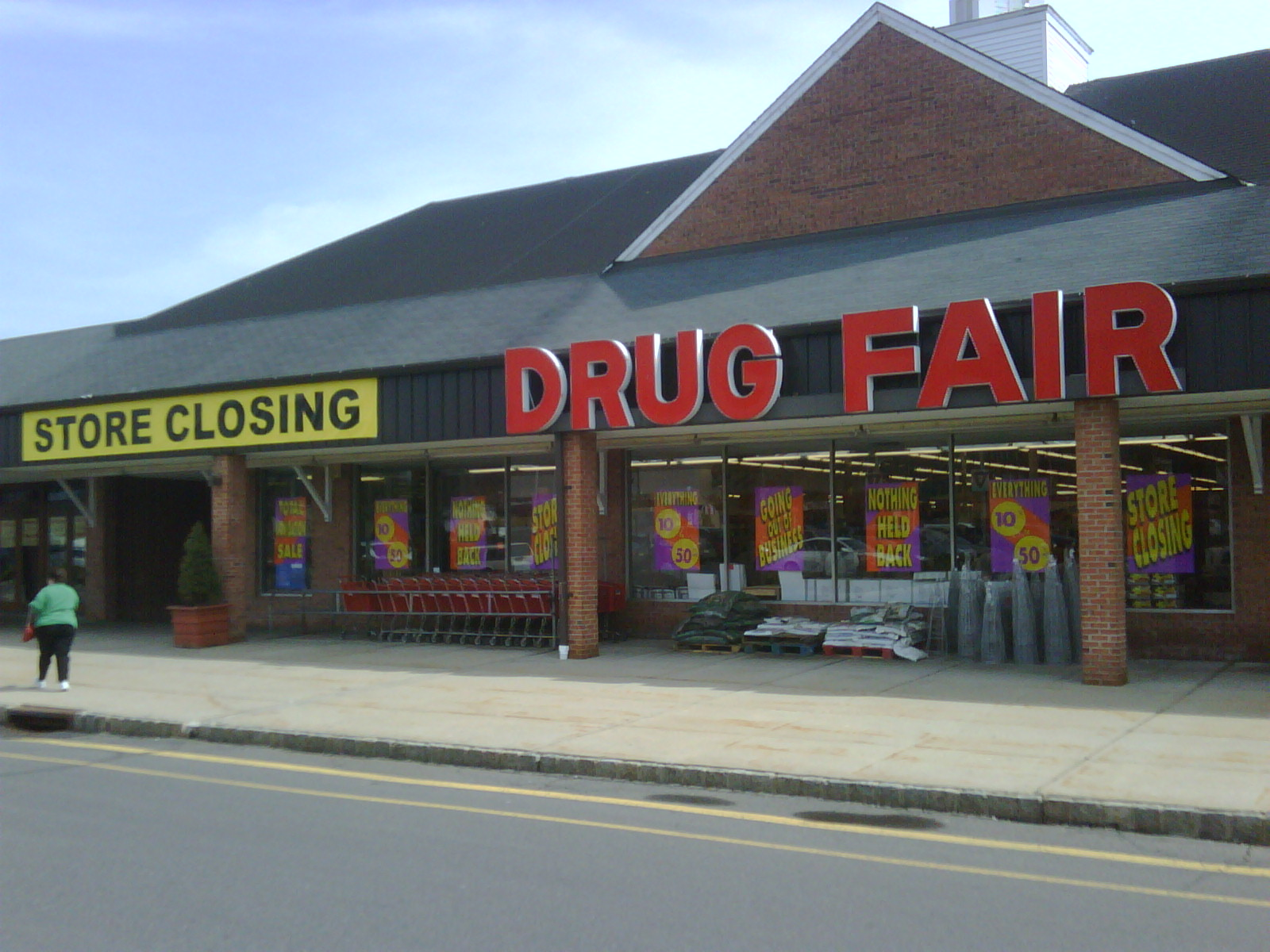
Businesses that file for bankruptcy may have a "store closing" sale to liquidate their stock, such as this Drug Fair.

Bankruptcy is a legal process through which people or other entities who cannot repay debts to creditors may seek relief from some or all of their debts. In most jurisdictions, bankruptcy is imposed by a court order, often initiated by the debtor.

Bankrupt is not the only legal status that an insolvent person may have, meaning the term bankruptcy is not a synonym for insolvency.

== Etymology ==
The word bankruptcy is derived from Italian banca rotta, literally meaning 'broken bank'. The term is often described as having originated in Renaissance Italy, where there allegedly existed the tradition of smashing a banker's bench if he defaulted on payment. However, the existence of such a ritual is doubted.

== History ==
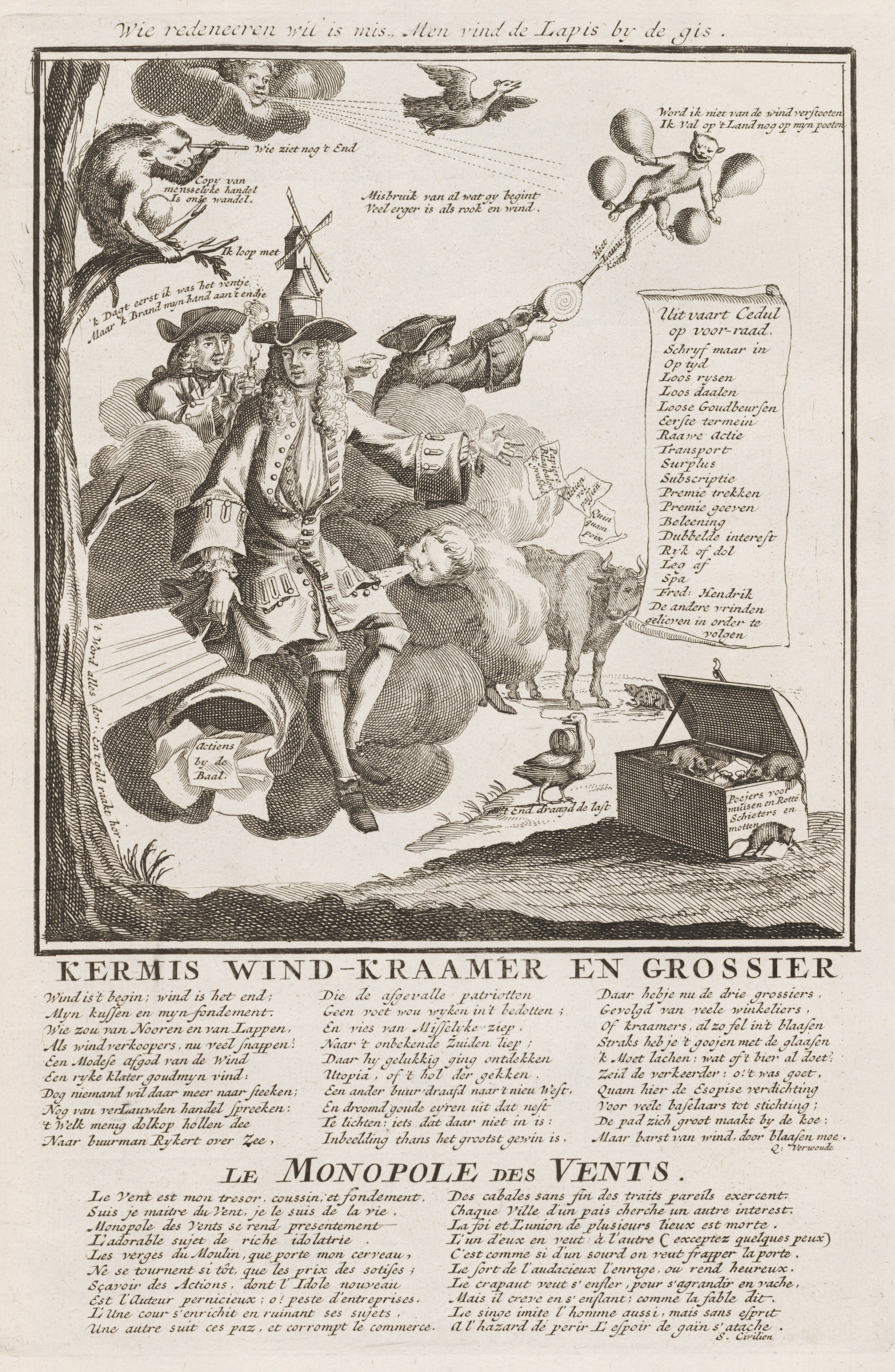
Failure of John Law's Mississippi Company led to French national bankruptcy in 1720.

In Ancient Greece, bankruptcy did not exist. If a man owed and he could not pay, he and his wife, children or servants were forced into "debt slavery" until the creditor recouped losses through their physical labour. Many city-states in ancient Greece limited debt slavery to a period of five years; debt slaves had protection of life and limb, which regular slaves did not have. However, servants of the debtor could be retained beyond that deadline by the creditor and were often forced to serve their new lord for a lifetime, usually under significantly harsher conditions. An exception to this rule was Athens, which by the laws of Solon forbade enslavement for debt; as a consequence, most Athenian slaves were foreigners (Greek or otherwise).

The Statute of Bankrupts of 1542 was the first statute under English law dealing with bankruptcy or insolvency. Bankruptcy is also documented in East Asia. According to al-Maqrizi, the Yassa of Genghis Khan contained a provision that mandated the death penalty for anyone who became bankrupt three times.

A failure of a nation to meet bond repayments has been seen on many occasions. In a similar way, Philip II of Spain had to declare four state bankruptcies in 1557, 1560, 1575 and 1596. According to Kenneth S. Rogoff, "Although the development of international capital markets was quite limited prior to 1800, we nevertheless catalog the various defaults of France, Portugal, Prussia, Spain, and the early Italian city-states. At the edge of Europe, Egypt, Russia, and Turkey have histories of chronic default as well."

== Modern law and debt restructuring ==
The principal focus of modern insolvency legislation and business debt restructuring practices no longer rests on the elimination of insolvent entities, but on the remodeling of the financial and organizational structure of debtors experiencing financial distress so as to permit the rehabilitation and continuation of the business.

For private households, it's important to assess the underlying problems and to minimize the risk of financial distress to recur. It has been stressed that debt advice, a supervised rehabilitation period, financial education and social help to find sources of income and to improve the management of household expenditures must be equally provided during this period of rehabilitation (Refiner et al., 2003; Gerhardt, 2009; Frade, 2010). In most EU member states, debt discharge is conditioned by a partial payment obligation and by a number of requirements concerning the debtor's behavior. In the United States (US), discharge is conditioned to a lesser extent. The spectrum is broad in the EU, with the UK coming closest to the US system (Reifner et al., 2003; Gerhardt, 2009; Frade, 2010). The other member states do not provide the option of a debt discharge. Spain, for example, passed a bankruptcy law (ley concurs) in 2003 which provides for debt settlement plans that can result in a reduction of the debt (maximally half of the amount) or an extension of the payment period of maximally five years (Gerhardt, 2009), but it does not foresee debt discharge.

In the US, it is very difficult to discharge federal or federally guaranteed student loan debt by filing bankruptcy. Unlike most other debts, those student loans may be discharged only if the person seeking discharge establishes specific grounds for discharge under the Brunner test under which a court evaluates three factors:

- If required to repay the loan, the borrower cannot maintain a minimal standard of living;
- The borrower's financial situation is likely to continue for most or all of the repayment period; and
- The borrower has made a good-faith effort to repay the student loans.

Even if a debtor proves all three elements, a court may permit only a partial discharge of the student loan. Student loan borrowers may benefit from restructuring their payments through a Chapter 13 bankruptcy repayment plan, but few qualify for discharge of part or all of their student loan debt.

== Fraud ==
Bankruptcy fraud is a white-collar crime most typically involving concealment of assets by a debtor to avoid liquidation in bankruptcy proceedings. It may include filing of false information, multiple filings in different jurisdictions, bribery, and other acts.

While difficult to generalize across jurisdictions, common criminal acts under bankruptcy statutes typically involve concealment of assets, concealment or destruction of documents, conflicts of interest, fraudulent claims, false statements or declarations, and fee fixing or redistribution arrangements. Falsifications on bankruptcy forms often constitute perjury. Multiple filings are not in and of themselves criminal, but they may violate provisions of bankruptcy law. In the U.S., bankruptcy fraud statutes are particularly focused on the mental state of particular actions. Bankruptcy fraud is a federal crime in the United States.

Bankruptcy fraud should be distinguished from strategic bankruptcy, which is not a criminal act since it creates a real (not a fake) bankruptcy state. However, it may still work against the filer.

All assets must be disclosed in bankruptcy schedules whether or not the debtor believes the asset has a net value. This is because once a bankruptcy petition is filed, it is for the creditors, not the debtor, to decide whether a particular asset has value. The future ramifications of omitting assets from schedules can be quite serious for the offending debtor. In the United States, a closed bankruptcy may be reopened by motion of a creditor or the U.S. trustee if a debtor attempts to later assert ownership of such an "unscheduled asset" after being discharged of all debt in the bankruptcy. The trustee may then seize the asset and liquidate it to benefit the (formerly discharged) creditors. Whether or not a concealment of such an asset should also be considered for prosecution as fraud or perjury would then be at the discretion of the judge or U.S. Trustee.

== By country ==
In some countries, such as the United Kingdom, bankruptcy is limited to individuals; other forms of insolvency proceedings (such as liquidation and administration) are applied to companies. In the United States, bankruptcy is applied more broadly to formal insolvency proceedings. In some countries, such as in Finland, bankruptcy is limited only to companies and individuals who are insolvent are condemned to de facto indentured servitude or minimum social benefits until their debts are paid in full, with accrued interest except when the court decides to show rare clemency by accepting a debtors application for debt restructuring, in which case an individual may have the amount of remaining debt reduced or be released from the debt.

=== Argentina ===
In Argentina, the national Act "24.522 de Concursos y Quiebras" regulates Bankruptcy and Reorganization of individuals and companies; public entities are not included.

=== Armenia ===
A person may be declared bankrupt with an application submitted to the court by the creditor or with an application to recognize his own bankruptcy. Legal and natural persons, including individual entrepreneurs, who have an indisputable payment obligation exceeding 60 days and amounting to more than one million AMD can be declared bankrupt. All creditors, including the state and municipalities, to whom the person has an obligation that meets the above-mentioned minimum criteria can submit an application to declare a person bankrupt by compulsory procedure. Basically, these obligations are derived from the legal acts of the court, transactions, the obligation of the debtor to pay taxes, duties, and other fees defined by law.

At the same time, when being declared bankrupt with a voluntary bankruptcy application, the applicant bears the obligation to prove the fact that the value of his assets is less than his assets by one million AMD or more.

=== Australia ===
In Australia, bankruptcy is a status which applies to individuals and is governed by the federal Bankruptcy Act 1966. Companies do not go bankrupt but rather go into liquidation or administration, which is governed by the federal Corporations Act 2001.

If a person commits an act of bankruptcy, then a creditor can apply to the Federal Circuit Court or the Federal Court for a sequestration order. Acts of bankruptcy are defined in the legislation, and include the failure to comply with a bankruptcy notice. A bankruptcy notice can be issued where, among other cases, a person fails to pay a judgment debt of at least $5,000. A person can also seek to have themselves declared bankrupt for any amount of debt by lodging a debtor's petition with the "Official Receiver", which is the Australian Financial Security Authority (AFSA).

All bankrupts must lodge a Statement of Affairs document, also known as a Bankruptcy Form, with AFSA, which includes important information about their assets and liabilities. A bankruptcy cannot be discharged until this document has been lodged.

Ordinarily, a bankruptcy lasts three years from the filing of the Statement of Affairs with AFSA.

A Bankruptcy Trustee (in most cases, the Official Trustee at AFSA) is appointed to deal with all matters regarding the administration of the bankrupt estate. The Trustee's job includes notifying creditors of the estate and dealing with creditor inquiries; ensuring that the bankrupt complies with their obligations under the Bankruptcy Act; investigating the bankrupt's financial affairs; realising funds to which the estate is entitled under the Bankruptcy Act and distributing dividends to creditors if sufficient funds become available.

For the duration of their bankruptcy, all bankrupts have certain restrictions placed upon them. For example, a bankrupt must obtain the permission of their trustee to travel overseas. Failure to do so may result in the bankrupt being stopped at the airport by the Australian Federal Police. Additionally, a bankrupt is required to provide their trustee with details of income and assets. If the bankrupt does not comply with the Trustee's request to provide details of income, the trustee may have grounds to lodge an Objection to Discharge, which has the effect of extending the bankruptcy for a further three or five years depending on the type of Objection.

The realisation of funds usually comes from two main sources: the bankrupt's assets and the bankrupt's wages. There are certain assets that are protected, referred to as protected assets. These include household furniture and appliances, tools of the trade and vehicles up to a certain value. All other assets of value can be sold. If a house, including the main residence, or car is above a certain value, a third party can buy the interest from the estate in order for the bankrupt to utilise the asset. If this is not done, the interest vests in the estate and the trustee is able to take possession of the asset and sell it.

The bankrupt must pay income contributions if their income is above a certain threshold. If the bankrupt fails to pay, the trustee can ask the Official Receiver to issue a notice to garnishee the bankrupt's wages. If that is not possible, the Trustee may seek to extend the bankruptcy for a further three or five years.

Bankruptcies can be annulled, and the bankrupt released from bankruptcy, prior to the expiration of the normal three-year period if all debts are paid out in full. Sometimes a bankrupt may be able to raise enough funds to make an Offer of Composition to creditors, which would have the effect of paying the creditors some of the money they are owed. If the creditors accept the offer, the bankruptcy can be annulled after the funds are received.

After the bankruptcy is annulled or the bankrupt has been automatically discharged, the bankrupt's credit report status is shown as "discharged bankrupt" for some years. The maximum number of years this information can be held is subject to the retention limits under the Privacy Act. How long such information is on a credit report may be shorter, depending on the issuing company, but the report must cease to record that information based on the criteria in the Privacy Act.

=== Brazil ===
In Brazil, the Bankruptcy Law (11.101/05) governs court-ordered or out-of-court receivership and bankruptcy and only applies to public companies (publicly traded companies) with the exception of financial institutions, credit cooperatives, consortia, supplementary scheme entities, companies administering health care plans, equity companies and a few other legal entities. It does not apply to state-run companies.

Current law covers three legal proceedings. The first one is bankruptcy itself ("Falência"). Bankruptcy is a court-ordered liquidation procedure for an insolvent business. The final goal of bankruptcy is to liquidate company assets and pay its creditors.

The second one is Court-ordered Restructuring (Recuperação Judicial). The goal is to overcome the business crisis situation of the debtor in order to allow the continuation of the producer, the employment of workers and the interests of creditors, leading, thus, to preserving company, its corporate function and develop economic activity. It is a court procedure required by the debtor which has been in business for more than two years and requires approval by a judge.

The Extrajudicial Restructuring (Recuperação Extrajudicial) is a private negotiation that involves creditors and debtors and, as with court-ordered restructuring, also must be approved by courts.

=== Canada ===
Bankruptcy, also referred to as insolvency in Canada, is governed by the Bankruptcy and Insolvency Act and is applicable to businesses and individuals. For example, Target Canada, the Canadian subsidiary of the Target Corporation, the second-largest discount retailer in the United States filed for bankruptcy on 15 January 2015, and closed all of its stores by 12 April. The office of the Superintendent of Bankruptcy, a federal agency, is responsible for ensuring that bankruptcies are administered in a fair and orderly manner by all licensed Trustees in Canada.

Trustees in bankruptcy, 1041 individuals licensed to administer insolvencies, bankruptcy and proposal estates are governed by the Bankruptcy and Insolvency Act of Canada.

Bankruptcy is filed when a person or a company becomes insolvent and cannot pay their debts as they become due and if they have at least $1,000 in debt.

In 2011, the Superintendent of Bankruptcy reported that trustees in Canada filed 127,774 insolvent estates. Consumer estates were the vast majority, with 122,999 estates. The consumer portion of the 2011 volume is divided into 77,993 bankruptcies and 45,006 consumer proposals. This represented a reduction of 8.9% from 2010. Commercial estates filed by Canadian trustees in 2011 4,775 estates, 3,643 bankruptcies and 1,132 Division 1 proposals. This represents a reduction of 8.6% over 2010.

==== Duties of trustees ====
Some of the duties of the trustee in bankruptcy are to:

- Review the file for any fraudulent preferences or reviewable transactions
- Chair meetings of creditors
- Sell any non-exempt assets
- Object to the bankrupt's discharge
- Distribute funds to creditors

==== Creditors' meetings ====
Creditors become involved by attending creditors' meetings. The trustee calls the first meeting of creditors for the following purposes:

- To consider the affairs of the bankrupt
- To affirm the appointment of the trustee or substitute another in place thereof
- To appoint inspectors
- To give such directions to the trustee as the creditors may see fit with reference to the administration of the estate.

==== Consumer proposals ====
In Canada, a person can file a consumer proposal as an alternative to bankruptcy. A consumer proposal is a negotiated settlement between a debtor and their creditors.

A typical proposal would involve a debtor making monthly payments for a maximum of five years, with the funds distributed to their creditors. Even though most proposals call for payments of less than the full amount of the debt owing, in most cases, the creditors accept the deal—because if they do not, the next alternative may be personal bankruptcy, in which the creditors get even less money. The creditors have 45 days to accept or reject the consumer proposal. Once the proposal is accepted by both the creditors and the Court, the debtor makes the payments to the Proposal Administrator each month (or as otherwise stipulated in their proposal), and the general creditors are prevented from taking any further legal or collection action. If the proposal is rejected, the debtor is returned to his prior insolvent state and may have no alternative but to declare personal bankruptcy.

A consumer proposal can only be made by a debtor with debts to a maximum of $250,000 (not including the mortgage on their principal residence). If debts are greater than $250,000, the proposal must be filed under Division 1 of Part III of the Bankruptcy and Insolvency Act. An Administrator is required in the Consumer Proposal, and a Trustee in the Division I Proposal (these are virtually the same although the terms are not interchangeable). A Proposal Administrator is almost always a licensed trustee in bankruptcy, although the Superintendent of Bankruptcy may appoint other people to serve as administrators.

In 2006, there were 98,450 personal insolvency filings in Canada: 79,218 bankruptcies and 19,232 consumer proposals.

==== Commercial restructuring ====
In Canada, bankruptcy always means liquidation. There is no way for a company to emerge from bankruptcy after restructuring, as is the case in the United States with a Chapter 11 bankruptcy filing. Canada does, however, have laws that allow for businesses to restructure and emerge later with a smaller debt load and a more positive financial future. While not technically a form of bankruptcy, businesses with $5M or more in debt may make use of the Companies' Creditors Arrangement Act to halt all debt recovery efforts against the company while they formulate a plan to restructure.

=== China ===
The People's Republic of China legalized bankruptcy in 1986, and a revised law that was more expansive and complete was enacted in 2007.

=== Ireland ===
Bankruptcy in Ireland applies only to natural persons. Other insolvency processes including liquidation and examinership are used to deal with corporate insolvency.

Irish bankruptcy law has been the subject of significant comment, from both government sources and the media, as being in need of reform. Part 7 of the Civil Law (Miscellaneous Provisions) Act 2011 has started this process and the government has committed to further reform.

=== Israel ===
Bankruptcy in Israel is governed by the Insolvency and Rehabilitation Law, 2018. Insolvency proceedings below ₪150,000 will be administered entirely by the Enforcement and Collection Authority. Insolvency proceedings above ₪150,000 individual debtors file the documents will be conducted before the official receiver (the Insolvency Commissioner) and, if a creditor want to file against a debtor, he needs to open process, before the magistrate's court that hears in the district. Company bankruptcy will be conducted before District Court. Simultaneously, with the issue of the order for the commencement of insolvency proceedings, the Insolvency Commissioner shall appoint a trustee for the debtor and an audit will be carried out, in which the debtor's economic capability and his conduct will be examined (lasting approximately 12 months). At the end of this audit a payment plan is established, at the end of which the debtor will receive a discharge. The default scenario is a payment period of three years; however, the court reserves the right to increase or decrease the period depending upon the circumstances of the case. If the debtor has no proven financial ability to pay the creditors, he may be granted an immediate discharge. Since 1996, Israeli personal bankruptcy law has shifted to a relatively debtor-friendly regime, not unlike the American model.

=== India ===
In May 2016, the Parliament of India passed the Insolvency and Bankruptcy Code (IBC), updating outdated corporate insolvency laws. The IBC streamlined the process, reducing delays from a decade to 180 days, and replaced the Board for Industrial and Financial Reconstruction (BIFR) with a market-driven approach.

=== The Netherlands ===
Dutch bankruptcy law is governed by the Dutch Bankruptcy Code (Faillissementswet). The code covers three separate legal proceedings:

1. Bankruptcy (faillissement). The goal of bankruptcy is the liquidation of the assets of the company. Bankruptcy applies only to companies.
2. Surseance van betaling (lit. 'suspension of payments'). This only applies to companies. Its goal is to reach an agreement with the creditors of the company. It is comparable to filing for protection against creditors.
3. Schuldsanering (lit. 'debt reorganization'). This proceeding is designed for individuals only and is the result of a court ruling. The judge appoints a monitor. The monitor is an independent third party who monitors the individual's ongoing business and decides about financial matters during the period of the schuldsanering. The individual can travel out of the country freely after the judge's decision on the case.

=== Russia ===
Federal Law No. 127-FZ "On Insolvency (Bankruptcy)" dated 26 October 2002 (as amended) (the "Bankruptcy Act"), replacing the previous law in 1998, to better address the above problems and a broader failure of the action. Russian insolvency law is intended for a wide range of borrowers: individuals and companies of all sizes, with the exception of state-owned enterprises, government agencies, political parties and religious organizations. There are also special rules for insurance companies, professional participants of the securities market, agricultural organizations and other special laws for financial institutions and companies in the natural monopolies in the energy industry. Federal Law No. 40-FZ "On Insolvency (Bankruptcy)" dated 25 February 1999 (as amended) (the "Insolvency Law of Credit Institutions") contains special provisions in relation to the opening of insolvency proceedings in relation to the credit company. Insolvency Provisions Act, credit organizations used in conjunction with the provisions of the Bankruptcy Act.

Bankruptcy law provides for the following stages of insolvency proceedings:

- Monitoring procedure or Supervision (наблюдение, nablyudeniye);
- Economic recovery (финансовое оздоровление, finansovoe ozdorovleniye);
- External control (внешнее управление, vneshneye upravleniye);
- Liquidation (konkursnoye proizvodstvo) and
- Amicable Agreement (мировое соглашение, mirovoye soglasheniye).

The main face of the bankruptcy process is the insolvency officer (trustee in bankruptcy, bankruptcy manager). At various stages of bankruptcy, he must be determined: the temporary officer in monitoring procedure, external manager in external control, the receiver or administrative officer in the economic recovery, the liquidator. During the bankruptcy trustee in bankruptcy (insolvency officer) has a decisive influence on the movement of assets (property) of the debtor – the debtor and has a key influence on the economic and legal aspects of its operations.

=== Spain ===
In Spain, people who cannot repay their home mortgages may declare bankruptcy. Bankruptcy and foreclosure discharges the obligation to pay mortgage interest, but not mortgage principal. If mortgage principal is not paid, the debtor is placed on a list of untrustworthy people.

=== Switzerland ===
Under Swiss law, bankruptcy can be a consequence of insolvency. It is a court-ordered form of debt enforcement proceedings that applies, in general, to registered commercial entities only. In a bankruptcy, all assets of the debtor are liquidated under the administration of the creditors, although the law provides for debt restructuring options similar to those under Chapter 11 of the U.S. Bankruptcy code.

=== Sweden ===
In Sweden, bankruptcy (Swedish: konkurs) is a formal process that may involve a company or individual. A creditor or the company itself can apply for bankruptcy. An external bankruptcy manager takes over the company or the assets of the person, and tries to sell as much as possible. A person or a company in bankruptcy cannot access its assets (with some exceptions).

The formal bankruptcy process is rarely carried out for individuals. Creditors can claim money through the Enforcement Administration anyway, and creditors do not usually benefit from the bankruptcy of individuals because there are costs of a bankruptcy manager which has priority. Unpaid debts remain after bankruptcy for individuals. People who are deeply in debt can obtain a debt arrangement procedure (Swedish: skuldsanering). On application, they obtain a payment plan under which they pay as much as they can for five years, and then all remaining debts are cancelled. Debts that derive from a ban on business operations (issued by court, commonly for tax fraud or fraudulent business practices) or owed to a crime victim as compensation for damages, are exempted from this—and, as before this process was introduced in 2006, remain lifelong. Debts that have not been claimed during a 3–10 year period are cancelled. Often crime victims stop their claims after a few years since criminals often do not have job incomes and might be hard to locate, while banks make sure their claims are not cancelled. The most common reasons for personal insolvency in Sweden are illness, unemployment, divorce or company bankruptcy.

For companies, formal bankruptcy is a normal effect of insolvency, even if there is a reconstruction mechanism where the company can be given time to solve its situation, e.g. by finding an investor. The government can pay salaries to employees in insolvent companies which do not pay them, but only if the company is declared bankrupt. Therefore, it is normal that trade union do the application for bankruptcy if a supplier has not already done so.

The formal bankruptcy involves contracting a bankruptcy manager, who makes certain that assets are sold and money divided by the priority the law claims, and no other way. Banks have such a priority. After a finished bankruptcy for a company, it is terminated. The activities might continue in a new company which has bought important assets from the bankrupted company.

=== United Arab Emirates ===
The United Arab Emirates Bankruptcy Law came into force on 29 December 2016, and created a single law governing bankruptcy procedures, which had previously been spread across multiple sources. There are two court procedures: first, a procedure for a company that is not yet insolvent, known as a protective composition, and second, a formal bankruptcy that is split into a rescue process (similar to protective composition) or liquidation.

Directors of a company can be held personally liable for its debts.

The Bankruptcy Law does not apply to government bodies, or to companies trading in free zones such as the Dubai International Financial Centre or the Abu Dhabi Global Market, which have their own insolvency laws.

=== United Kingdom ===
Bankruptcy in the United Kingdom (in a strict legal sense) relates only to individuals (including sole proprietors) and partnerships. Companies and other corporations enter into differently named legal insolvency procedures: liquidation and administration (administration order and administrative receivership). However, the term 'bankruptcy' is often used when referring to companies in the media and in general conversation. Bankruptcy in Scotland is referred to as sequestration. To apply for bankruptcy in Scotland, an individual must have more than £1,500 of debt.

A trustee in bankruptcy must be either an Official Receiver (a civil servant) or a licensed insolvency practitioner. Current law in England and Wales derives in large part from the Insolvency Act 1986. Following the introduction of the Enterprise Act 2002, bankruptcy in England and Wales now normally lasts no longer than 12 months, and may be less if the Official Receiver files in court a certificate that investigations are complete. It was expected that the UK Government's liberalisation of the bankruptcy regime would increase the number of bankruptcy cases; initially, cases increased, as the Insolvency Service statistics appear to bear out. Since 2009, the introduction of the Debt Relief Order has resulted in a dramatic fall in bankruptcies, the latest estimates for year 2014/15 being significantly less than 30,000 cases.

UK bankruptcy statistics
Year	Bankruptcies	IVAs	Total
2004	35,989	10,752	46,741
2005	47,291	20,293	67,584
2006	62,956	44,332	107,288
2007	64,480	42,165	106,645
2008	67,428	39,116	106,544

==== Pensions ====
The UK bankruptcy law was changed in May 2000, effective from 29 May 2000. Debtors may now retain occupational pensions while in bankruptcy, except in rare cases.

==== Involuntary bankruptcy ====
In the United Kingdom, creditors can have a person who owes them money declared bankrupt involuntarily by a court. This can be done when a creditor can prove that they are owed a debt of £5,000 or a share of a person's debts totaling at least £5,000. According to Citizens Advice, the reasons for petitioning to have someone declared bankrupt involuntarily can include forcing an individual to sell land or property to pay their debts, simply to punish an individual, to try to stop someone from getting credit in the future, to force an investigation of someone's finances in case they are hiding assets, or to help force an employer to pay wages a group of employees is owed.

=== United States ===
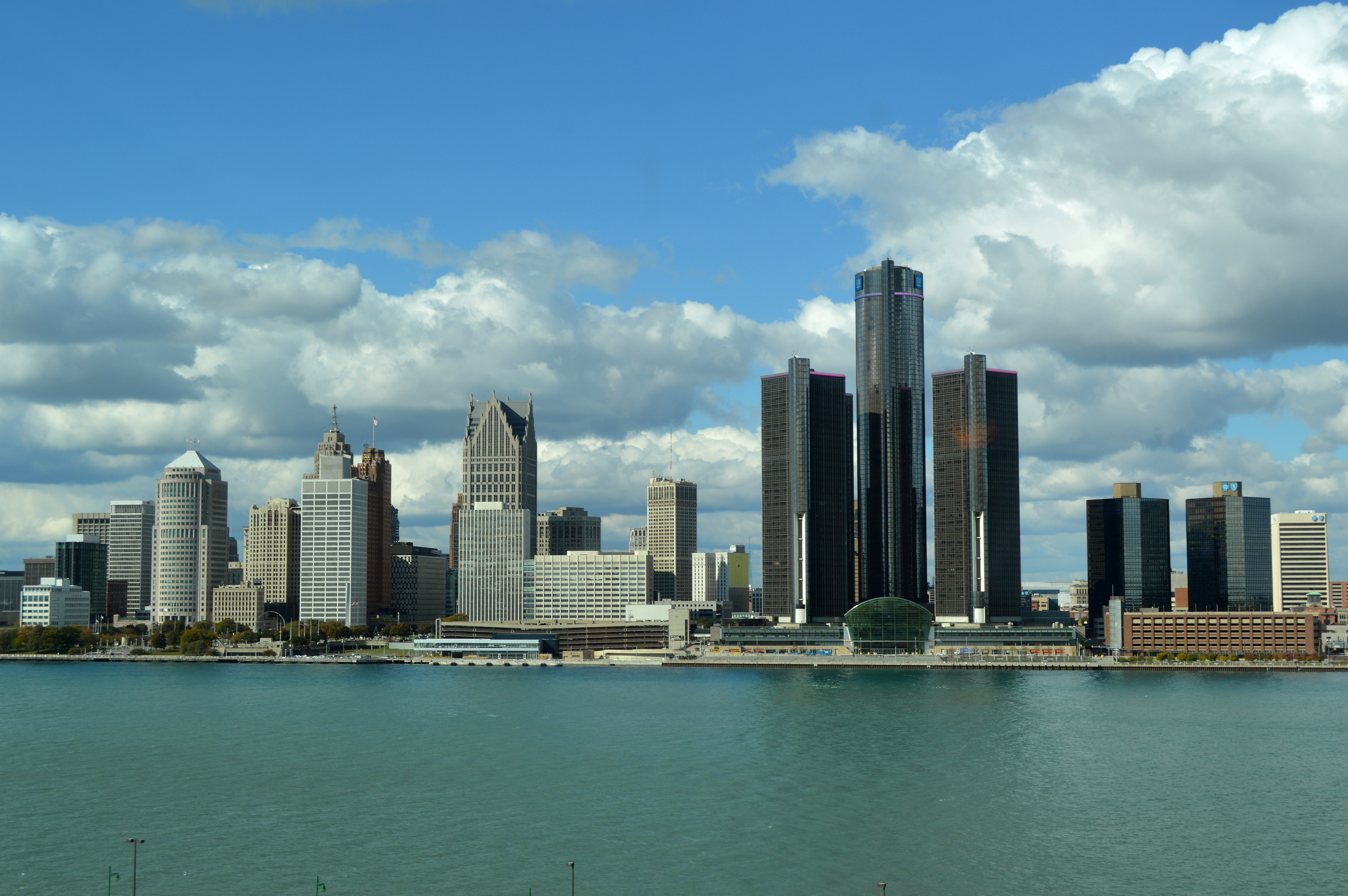
In 2013, Detroit filed the largest municipal bankruptcy case in U.S. history.

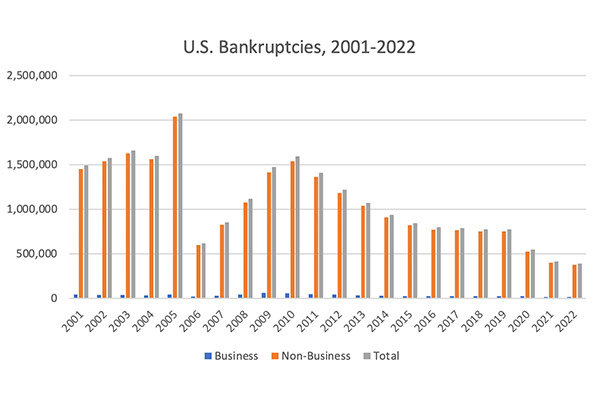
Number of personal and business US bankruptcy filings by year.

Bankruptcy in the United States is a matter placed under federal jurisdiction by the United States Constitution (in Article 1, Section 8, Clause 4), which empowers Congress to enact "uniform Laws on the subject of Bankruptcies throughout the United States". Congress has enacted statutes governing bankruptcy, primarily in the form of the Bankruptcy Code, located at Title 11 of the United States Code.

A debtor declares bankruptcy to obtain relief from debt, and this is normally accomplished either through a discharge of the debt or through a restructuring of the debt. When a debtor files a voluntary petition, their bankruptcy case commences.

==== Debts and exemptions ====
While bankruptcy cases are always filed in United States Bankruptcy Court (an adjunct to the U.S. District Courts), bankruptcy cases, particularly with respect to the validity of claims and exemptions, are often dependent upon State law. A Bankruptcy Exemption defines the property a debtor may retain and preserve through bankruptcy. Certain real and personal property can be exempted on "Schedule C" of a debtor's bankruptcy forms, and effectively be taken outside the debtor's bankruptcy estate. Bankruptcy exemptions are available only to individuals filing bankruptcy.

There are two alternative systems that can be used to exempt property from a bankruptcy estate, federal exemptions (available in some states but not all), and state exemptions (which vary widely between states). For example, Maryland and Virginia, which are adjoining states, have different personal exemption amounts that cannot be seized for payment of debts. This amount is the first $6,000 in property or cash in Maryland, but normally only the first $5,000 in Virginia. State law therefore plays a major role in many bankruptcy cases, such that there may be significant differences in the outcome of a bankruptcy case depending upon the state in which it is filed.

After a bankruptcy petition is filed, the court schedules a hearing called a 341 meeting or meeting of creditors, at which the bankruptcy trustee and creditors review the petitioner's petition and supporting schedules, question the petitioner, and can challenge exemptions they believe are improper.

==== Chapters ====
There are six types of bankruptcy under the Bankruptcy Code, located at Title 11 of the United States Code:

- Chapter 7: basic liquidation for individuals and businesses; also known as straight bankruptcy; it is the simplest and quickest form of bankruptcy available
- Chapter 9: municipal bankruptcy; a federal mechanism for the resolution of municipal debts
- Chapter 11: rehabilitation or reorganization, used primarily by business debtors but sometimes by individuals with substantial debts and assets; known as corporate bankruptcy, it is a form of corporate financial reorganization that typically allows companies to continue to function while they follow debt repayment plans
- Chapter 12: rehabilitation for family farmers and fishermen
- Chapter 13: rehabilitation with a payment plan for individuals with a regular source of income; enables individuals with regular income to develop a plan to repay all or part of their debts; also known as wage earner bankruptcy
- Chapter 15: ancillary and other international cases; provides a mechanism for dealing with bankruptcy debtors and helps foreign debtors clear debts

An important feature applicable to all types of bankruptcy filings is the automatic stay. The automatic stay means that the mere request for bankruptcy protection automatically halts most lawsuits, repossessions, foreclosures, evictions, garnishments, attachments, utility shut-offs, and debt collection activity.

The most common types of personal bankruptcy for individuals are Chapter 7 and Chapter 13. Chapter 7, known as a "straight bankruptcy", involves the discharge of certain debts without repayment. Chapter 13 involves a plan of repayment of debts over a period of years. Whether a person qualifies for Chapter 7 or Chapter 13 is in part determined by income. As many as 65% of all US consumer bankruptcy filings are Chapter 7 cases.

Before a consumer may obtain bankruptcy relief under either Chapter 7 or Chapter 13, the debtor is to undertake credit counseling with approved counseling agencies prior to filing a bankruptcy petition and to undertake education in personal financial management from approved agencies prior to being granted a discharge of debts under either Chapter 7 or Chapter 13. Some studies of the operation of the credit counseling requirement suggest that it provides little benefit to debtors who receive the counseling because the only realistic option for many is to seek relief under the Bankruptcy Code.

Corporations and other business forms normally file under Chapters 7 or 11.

===== Chapter 7 =====
Often called "straight bankruptcy" or "simple bankruptcy", a Chapter 7 bankruptcy potentially allows debtors to eliminate most or all of their debts over a period of as little as three or four months. In a typical consumer bankruptcy, the only debts that survive a Chapter 7 are student loans, child support obligations, some tax bills, and criminal fines. Credit cards, pay day loans, personal loans, medical bills, and just about all other bills are discharged.

In Chapter 7, a debtor surrenders non-exempt property to a bankruptcy trustee, who then liquidates the property and distributes the proceeds to the debtor's unsecured creditors. In exchange, the debtor is entitled to a discharge of some debt. However, the debtor is not granted a discharge if guilty of certain types of inappropriate behavior (e.g., concealing records relating to financial condition) and certain debts (e.g., spousal and child support and most student loans). Some taxes are not discharged even though the debtor is generally discharged from debt. Many individuals in financial distress own only exempt property (e.g., clothes, household goods, an older car, or the tools of their trade or profession) and do not have to surrender any property to the trustee. The amount of property that a debtor may exempt varies from state to state (as noted above, Virginia and Maryland have a $1,000 difference). Chapter 7 relief is available only once in any eight-year period. Generally, the rights of secured creditors to their collateral continues, even though their debt is discharged. For example, absent some arrangement by a debtor to surrender a car or "reaffirm" a debt, the creditor with a security interest in the debtor's car may repossess the car even if the debt to the creditor is discharged.

Ninety-one percent of US individuals who petition for relief under Chapter 7 hire an attorney to file their petitions. The typical cost of an attorney is $1,170.00. Alternatives to filing with an attorney are: filing pro se, hiring a non-lawyer petition preparer, or using online software to generate the petition.

To be eligible to file a consumer bankruptcy under Chapter 7, a debtor must qualify under a statutory means test. The means test was intended to make it more difficult for a significant number of financially distressed individual debtors whose debts are primarily consumer debts to qualify for relief under Chapter 7 of the Bankruptcy Code. The "means test" is employed in cases where an individual with primarily consumer debts has more than the average annual income for a household of equivalent size, computed over a 180-day period prior to filing. If the individual must take the means test, their average monthly income over this 180-day period is reduced by a series of allowances for living expenses and secured debt payments in a very complex calculation that may or may not accurately reflect that individual's actual monthly budget. If the results of the means test show no disposable income (or in some cases a very small amount) then the individual qualifies for Chapter 7 relief. An individual who fails the means test will have their Chapter 7 case dismissed, or may have to convert the case to a Chapter 13 bankruptcy.

If a debtor does not qualify for relief under Chapter 7 of the Bankruptcy Code, either because of the Means Test or because Chapter 7 does not provide a permanent solution to delinquent payments for secured debts, such as mortgages or vehicle loans, the debtor may still seek relief under Chapter 13 of the Code.

Generally, a trustee sells most of the debtor's assets to pay off creditors. However, certain debtor assets will be protected to some extent by bankruptcy exemptions. These include Social Security payments, unemployment compensation, limited equity in a home, car, or truck, household goods and appliances, trade tools, and books. However, these exemptions vary from state to state.

===== Chapter 11 =====
In Chapter 11 bankruptcy, the debtor retains ownership and control of assets and is re-termed a debtor in possession (DIP). The debtor in possession runs the day-to-day operations of the business while creditors and the debtor work with the Bankruptcy Court in order to negotiate and complete a plan. Upon meeting certain requirements (e.g., fairness among creditors, priority of certain creditors) creditors are permitted to vote on the proposed plan. If a plan is confirmed, the debtor continues to operate and pay debts under the terms of the confirmed plan. If a specified majority of creditors do not vote to confirm a plan, additional requirements may be imposed by the court in order to confirm the plan. Debtors filing for Chapter 11 protection a second time are known informally as "Chapter 22" filers.

In a corporate or business bankruptcy, an indebted company is typically recapitalized so that it emerges from bankruptcy with more equity and less debt, with potential for dispute over the valuation of the reorganized business.

===== Chapter 13 =====
In Chapter 13, debtors retain ownership and possession of all their assets but must devote some portion of future income to repaying creditors, generally over three to five years. The amount of payment and period of the repayment plan depend upon a variety of factors, including the value of the debtor's property and the amount of a debtor's income and expenses. Under this chapter, the debtor can propose a repayment plan in which to pay creditors over three to five years. If the monthly income is less than the state's median income, the plan is for three years, unless the court finds just cause to extend the plan for a longer period. If the debtor's monthly income is greater than the median income for individuals in the debtor's state, the plan must generally be for five years. A plan cannot exceed the five-year limit.

Relief under Chapter 13 is available only to individuals with regular income whose debts do not exceed prescribed limits. If the debtor is an individual or a sole proprietor, the debtor is allowed to file for a Chapter 13 bankruptcy to repay all or part of the debts. Secured creditors may be entitled to greater payment than unsecured creditors.

In contrast to Chapter 7, the debtor in Chapter 13 may keep all property, whether or not exempt. If the plan appears feasible and if the debtor complies with all the other requirements, the bankruptcy court typically confirms the plan and the debtor and creditors are bound by its terms. Creditors have no say in the formulation of the plan, other than to object to it, if appropriate, on the grounds that it does not comply with one of the Code's statutory requirements. Generally, the debtor makes payments to a trustee who disburses the funds in accordance with the terms of the confirmed plan.

When the debtor completes payments pursuant to the terms of the plan, the court formally grant the debtor a discharge of the debts provided for in the plan. However, if the debtor fails to make the agreed upon payments or fails to seek or gain court approval of a modified plan, a bankruptcy court will normally dismiss the case on the motion of the trustee. After a dismissal, creditors may resume pursuit of state law remedies to recover the unpaid debt.

=== European Union ===
In 2004, the number of insolvencies reached record highs in many European countries. In France, company insolvencies rose by more than 4%, in Austria by more than 10%, and in Greece by more than 20%. The increase in the number of insolvencies, however, does not indicate the total financial impact of insolvencies in each country because there is no indication of the size of each case. An increase in the number of bankruptcy cases does not necessarily entail an increase in bad debt write-off rates for the economy as a whole.

Bankruptcy statistics are also a trailing indicator. There is a time delay between financial difficulties and bankruptcy. In most cases, several months or even years pass between the financial problems and the start of bankruptcy proceedings. Legal, tax, and cultural issues may further distort bankruptcy figures, especially when comparing on an international basis. Two examples:

- In Austria, more than half of all potential bankruptcy proceedings in 2004 were not opened, due to insufficient funding.
- In Spain, it is not economically profitable to open insolvency/bankruptcy proceedings against certain types of businesses, and therefore the number of insolvencies is quite low. For comparison: In France, more than 40,000 insolvency proceedings were opened in 2004, but under 600 were opened in Spain. At the same time the average bad debt write-off rate in France was 1.3% compared to Spain with 2.6%.

The insolvency numbers for private individuals also do not show the whole picture. Only a fraction of heavily indebted households file for insolvency. Two of the main reasons for this are the stigma of declaring themselves insolvent and the potential business disadvantage.

Following the soar in insolvencies in the previous decade, a number of European countries, such as France, Germany, Spain and Italy, began to revamp their bankruptcy laws in 2013. They modelled these new laws on Chapter 11 of the U.S. Bankruptcy Code. Currently, the majority of insolvency cases have ended in liquidation in Europe rather than the businesses surviving the crisis. These new law models are meant to change this; lawmakers are hoping to turn bankruptcy into a chance for restructuring rather than a death sentence for the companies.

EU policy aims to ensure that "honest entrepreneurs" are afforded a second chance at business development. A faster start-up programme for people affected by bankruptcy operating in Denmark and a scheme to support Belgian business owners and self-employed persons were highlighted in a 2008 European Commission Communication as good practice examples in this field.

== Effective sovereign bankruptcy ==
Technically, states do not collapse directly due to a sovereign default event itself. However, the tumultuous events that follow may bring down the state, so in common language, states would be described as being bankrupted.

An example of this is when the Goguryeo–Sui War in 614 A.D. ended in the disintegration of Sui dynasty China within 4 years, although their enemy Goguryeo (occupying modern Korea) also seemingly entered into decline and fell some 56 years later.

== See also ==
- Bankruptcy Act
- Bankruptcy alternatives
- Creditor's rights
- Debt consolidation
- Debt relief
- Debt restructuring
- Debtor in possession
- Default
- DIP Financing
- Distressed securities
- Financial distress
- Individual voluntary arrangement
- Insolvency
- Judicial estoppel
- Liquidation
- Protected trust deed
- Sole Trader Insolvency (UK)
- Stalking Horse Agreement
- Tools of trade
- Turnaround ADR
