= Individual voluntary arrangement =

Alternative to bankruptcy

An individual voluntary arrangement (IVA) is a formal alternative in England and Wales for individuals wishing to avoid bankruptcy. In Scotland, the equivalent statutory debt solution is known as a protected trust deed.

The IVA was established by and is governed by Part VIII of the Insolvency Act 1986. It constitutes a formal repayment proposal presented to a debtor's creditors via an insolvency practitioner. Usually but not necessarily, the IVA comprises only the claims of unsecured creditors and leaves the rights of secured creditors largely unchanged. Insolvency practitioners charge initial and ongoing fees that are in addition to the debt.

An IVA is a contractual arrangement with creditors and can be as flexible as an individual's own circumstances. It can therefore be based on capital, income, third-party payments or a combination of those.

In this process, a debtor who has enough money left over after priority creditors and essential expenses, may be able to arrange an individual voluntary arrangement. (After taking independent advice, debtors with less serious problems may wish to consider a debt management plan.)

The analogous procedure for businesses is the company voluntary arrangement.

== Process ==
Creditors take a decision at a creditors' meeting called to consider the IVA proposal. The return to creditors is often higher than they would receive in bankruptcy. A vote is taken – by value. 75% in value of those creditors who vote at the meeting by person or by proxy must agree in order for the arrangement to be approved. If any of those voting are 'associates' (usually business associates, friends and family) then a second count is taken and 50% of non-associated creditors must approve it.

IVAs were originally designed to provide relief to debts generated as a result of business insolvency. Since the late 1990s increasing levels of consumer debt have led to many insolvent individuals with non-business-generated debts seeking the legal protection offered within an IVA. IVAs may be popular with people who have assets which they wish to protect. These assets, such as high-equity properties and expensive cars etc., are not directly at risk under an IVA – as they may be in a bankruptcy.

== Advantages and disadvantages ==
The advantages and disadvantages of an IVA compared with other debt solutions are particular to a debtor's individual circumstances and professional advice should be sought to decide on the best option.

=== Stigma ===
An IVA is a private agreement between a debtor and creditors. As of 6 April 2009, bankruptcy is no longer advertised in the local newspaper, only in the London Gazette. IVA is not advertised. Both debtors in an IVA and bankruptcy are listed publicly on the Personal Insolvency Register - anyone can view the Insolvency Register but it is mainly used by credit reference agencies who use it to update credit records (an IVA will affect your credit record but this is the same as with other debt solutions), and creditors who will use the Insolvency Register to help them make a decision on whether they should lend money to potential customers. It is unlikely neighbours will check the Register, which can be a worry people assume when they find out they are going to be listed on a public register.

=== Length ===
An income-based IVA can often last up to five years, although it can be any length. Homeowners may find their income based IVA term can be extended by 12 months in lieu of equity, if they own equity in a property which cannot be released into the IVA for the benefit of their creditors.

A bankrupt is normally automatically discharged after one year or less if the bankrupt is eligible for an early discharge. An income payments agreement or order in bankruptcy (if one is applied, depending on the individual's disposable income) will not last for more than three years and payments are generally much lower than under an income based IVA.

=== Obtaining credit ===
Unlike bankruptcy, an IVA does not statutorily restrict a debtor from obtaining credit, although the proposal may do so. In bankruptcy however one legally can obtain credit of up to £500 without disclosing one's status as a bankrupt. After a bankrupt is discharged there is nothing in law to stop the discharged bankrupt gaining credit.

=== Ability to trade ===
Bankruptcy will usually dissolve a partnership and prevent a debtor from acting as a director of a company. A self-employed trader will have to disclose the fact that he or she is bankrupt when obtaining credit, for example when dealing with suppliers. There are no such implications with an IVA, although lenders often ask.

=== Credit rating ===
Although arguably an IVA is seen as more positive than bankruptcy in the eyes of creditors, as it shows a certain commitment to repaying debt, in reality an IVA is likely to have an equally detrimental effect on a debtor's credit rating as bankruptcy. Usually a debtor's credit rating is already poor before an IVA or bankruptcy is considered. Both bankruptcy and an IVA will stay on a debtor's credit file for six years from the start of the IVA or bankruptcy.

=== Fees and Disbursements ===
There are two separate fees payable in an IVA. Both of these fees are paid as part of the Arrangement and are included in the monthly contributions made to the IVA. These fees do not generally affect the total amount payable, but instead reduce the final dividend that each creditor hopes to receive from the IVA. As a result, an Insolvency Practitioner must agree his fees with voting creditors before an IVA is accepted.

The nominee's fee is a fee charged in relation to the work performed up to the point when the IVA is agreed. It is reclaimed from payments into the IVA before any dividend is paid to creditors.

The supervisor's fee is an ongoing fee in relation to the work performed during an IVA. It is reclaimed from payments into the IVA at regular intervals, as agreed with voting creditors. This could be quarterly or annually depending on the rules stipulated in the individual's proposal.

Some debt management companies try to include an extra IVA arrangement fee.

An IVA will also charge disbursements throughout the duration of the IVA, to cover any costs incurred by the supervisor managing the arrangement. Disbursements are split into category 1 and category 2 disbursements. Category 1 disbursements are costs directly related to arrangement and payments made to any third parties. Examples of these disbursements are bonds, PPI and mis-selling searches and set-up fees.

Category 1 disbursements cannot be capped by creditors.

Category 2 disbursements are related to the insolvency arrangement, however are not made to a third party. They include shared or allocated costs on a reasonable basis. Examples of this are business mileage, printing and photocopying and postage

=== The home ===
Perhaps the biggest advantage to an IVA over bankruptcy is the control the debtor may have over their home. In bankruptcy, the debtor's assets will vest in the Trustee (some assets are excluded, notably those used as tools of trade, ordinary household contents). This will usually include equity in their property and the trustee may force its sale. An IVA proposal may exclude the property altogether, or propose a re-mortgage or offer income based contributions for a longer period in lieu of the debtor's equitable interest in the property. The supervisor may register a restriction on the property to ensure that his or her consent is required before the property is, for example, sold or re-mortgaged.

=== Failure ===
If an IVA fails because an individual can not keep up with the repayments (or agree new terms with the trustee and creditors), then bankruptcy becomes a real possibility. Because a significant proportion of IVA repayments go towards payment of the nominee's and supervisor's fees, people who have failed an IVA often find they had not paid as much of the debt off as they had expected.

Additionally, creditors will also add on interest and charges to the debts from the meeting of creditors date to the date of failure (currently 8% per annum), thereby increasing the level of debt.

== Roles of the insolvency practitioner ==
An IVA can only be administered by a licensed insolvency practitioner. At each stage of the IVA process, the insolvency practitioner's role changes.

=== Adviser ===
The adviser does not have to be an insolvency practitioner, though often is. The adviser should inform the debtor of all the solutions available, commonly including dealing with priority debts first, re-mortgage, consolidating debts into a loan, debt management, bankruptcy, a Debt Relief Order, and IVA. The adviser should look at all the debtor's circumstances, what they own, what they owe, and their household income & expenditure to advise the best solution. The adviser may charge for debt advice, however most IVA providers will offer advice without any upfront cost. Charitable debt advice agencies include Citizens Advice Bureau, StepChange Debt Charity, and Christians Against Poverty who may suggest debt management measures that do not involve an IVA.

=== Nominee ===
If an IVA is considered appropriate, the insolvency practitioner will become the nominee. There is a misapprehension that it is the nominee's role to advise the debtor on drafting a proposal to the creditors. This is not the case. The legislation is clear that this is the task of the debtor and his or her advisers, which nevertheless may be the nominee's firm.

It is instead the nominee's task to review the proposal on which he has been asked to act, and to report on it.

In practice, the proposal is generally a standard document which is modified to the each debtor's particular circumstance. Common terms will include:

An analysis of the debtor's income (A) and expenditure (B). From this, the debtor's disposable income is calculated (A)−(B) and this will become the amount that will be paid into the IVA periodically (usually monthly). The period is usually five years, but can be any length. The proposal will usually state that if the disposable income increases during the term of the IVA, the amount to be paid will also increase proportionately.

A background history explaining how the debtor's financial difficulties arose.

Details of any assets that are to be realised or excluded. For example, how the matrimonial home will be dealt with, pension schemes, share save schemes, vehicles, etc.

The ability to call future meetings of creditors in the event that circumstances change, to modify the terms of the IVA.

Restrictions on obtaining credit. This is because a debt incurred after the approval of the IVA could result in a bankruptcy petition from a creditor, which would almost certainly cause the IVA to fail.

=== Chairman ===
The Chairman will hold the meeting of creditors and negotiate with the debtor and creditors to approve the proposal. It is common for creditors to ask for modifications to the proposal at the meeting. Common modifications put forward by major banks include restricting the debtor from obtaining credit, ensuring payments increase if the debtor's income increases, specifying a minimum return such as 40 pence in the pound, and insisting that the supervisor fails the IVA if the debtor misses 3 or more payments, and petitions for the debtor's bankruptcy.

=== Supervisor ===
If the IVA is approved, the insolvency practitioner named as supervisor in the approved IVA becomes the Supervisor of the IVA. This involves reporting annually to the creditors, debtor and the court. It also involves monitoring that the debtor is complying with the terms of the arrangement, agreeing creditor claims, making payments to creditors and generally ensuring that the arrangement progresses in accordance with the terms of the proposal. The debtor must comply with all reasonable requests of the supervisor, which may include periodically providing bank statements, accounts, wage slips etc.

== See also ==
- Administrations
- Administrative receiverships
- Bankruptcy
- Citizens Advice Bureau
- Company voluntary arrangement – the equivalent for companies
- Fast-track voluntary arrangement
- Liquidations
- Personal Insolvency Arrangement – a statutory mechanism in Ireland
- Trust deeds – only available in Scotland
- Simplified individual voluntary arrangement
- Sole trader insolvency
