= Protected trust deed =

A protected trust deed, overseen by the Accountant in Bankruptcy, is a voluntary but formal arrangement that is used by Scottish residents where a debtor (who can be a natural person or partnership) grants a trust deed in favor of the trustee which transfers their estate to the trustee for the benefit of creditors. Any person wanting to make an application for a protected trust deed must have been a resident of Scotland for at least six months prior to making the application.

This can be a way for people to deal with debt problems by protecting the debtor from the legal enforcement of debts which are included in the trust deed, but only once it has become protected. It will not reverse any action that has been taken prior to the trust deed, such as earning or bank arrestments, although the trustee may negotiate the lifting of any arrestment. Many people who enter trust deeds are able to keep their homes, but where there is equity, that equity will normally have to be realized to swell the estate. This can be achieved by third-party buyouts or remortgaging, but in extreme cases may be through the sale of the debtor's home.

== Benefits ==
Certain trust deeds may be registered as “protected”, thereby preventing creditors from petitioning for the debtor's sequestration. The main advantage of entering into a trust deed is that all correspondence is directed to the trustee, who handles all of the communication with the creditors. There is no court involvement, unless the debtor refuses to cooperate with the trustee.

The arrangement is likely to lessen issues from creditors while all the associated interest and charges from unsecured debts (in the trust deed) are frozen (unless the debtor becomes able to pay interest prior to discharge). After a minimum of four years the remainder of the debt can be written off. Generally, only disposable income is used to pay creditors, but other assets such as furniture could also be liquidated to help make contributions.

== Negatives ==
The main disadvantage of a trust deed is that existing enforcement action, such as earning and bank arrestments may continue to be effective and homeowners will be required to deal with equity in their home, should they have any. This can normally be dealt with without selling, although where there is an excessive amount of equity the debtor may be required to sell the property. Normally, equity can be dealt with by remortgaging, or extra monthly payments.

The trust deed does not stop a person from being self-employed. While in the protected trust deed, a person may not incur debt of more than £500. A common misconception is that credit can continue to be used while in a trust deed, however, this could result in criminal charges. When entering a trust deed a default will be placed on the debtor's credit file which will last for six years. Some people are unable to sign a trust deed because of their contract of employment states they cannot enter an insolvency solution. All protected trust deeds that fall under the Court of Session and within the territorial jurisdiction of Scotland are advertised as a public record in the AiB Register. Heavy penalties can accrue for missing a payment (or, depending upon circumstances and the view of the trustee, no penalties at all). Taking out future debts becomes difficult.

== Securing a trust deed ==
In order to enter such an agreement with your creditors, you must be a resident of Scotland. You need to consult the services of an insolvency practitioner who will be able to explain all your options to you, based on your present financial situation. The qualified practitioner will evaluate your income to debt ratio, such as mortgage, council tax, utility bills, and all other outgoings. Whatever is left from your earnings will be divided in equal proportions to pay towards your debts.

If, after learning how a trust deed works, you do decide to go ahead, the necessary paperwork will have to be signed. There are two types of trust deed – protected and unprotected. An unprotected trust deed is not binding for a creditor (company or other) who doesn't agree to the terms. A protected trust deed meanwhile is binding for the creditor, although they have a five-week period in which to appeal. It's in the interest of the trustee to have the trust deed protected, but it's not essential.

== Obligations ==
When one agrees to enter into a trust deed, you take on the responsibilities and obligations of a regular legally binding contract to repay your debt. As such when one agrees to the terms of the trust deed you commit to:

- Full co-operation with the trustee.
- To pay the agreed monthly contribution on time.
- To not enter into any additional credit agreements.
- To advise the trustee of any unexpected windfalls or payments or that your financial circumstances change.

Where, however, you experience a change in circumstances during your trust deed, such as unemployment, the trustee should review your finances to assess what is an appropriate level of contribution. This may mean you will only have to pay a reduced contribution or no contribution. Likewise, if during a trust deed your circumstances improve, one may be required to pay an increased monthly contribution.

Where one's circumstance change for the worse and you cannot maintain your level of contribution, although one may be allowed to pay a reduced contribution or no contribution you will still need to make arrangements to realize any equity in your property.

Where a trustee refuses to discharge the debtor at the end of the trust deed for failing to cooperate with the trustee, it may still be possible for the debtor to appeal to the sheriff for a discharge, especially where it can be shown they either didn't refuse to cooperate or couldn't reasonably be expected to.
