= Insolvency Act 1986 =

Act of the Parliament of the United Kingdom

Insolvency Act 1986 (Note: Section 444.)
- Act of Parliament
- Parliament of the United Kingdom
- Long title: An Act to consolidate the enactments relating to company insolvency and winding up (including the winding up of companies that are not insolvent, and of unregistered companies); enactments relating to the insolvency and bankruptcy of individuals; and other enactments bearing on those two subject matters, including the functions and qualification of insolvency practitioners, the public administration of insolvency, the penalisation and redress of malpractice and wrongdoing, and the avoidance of certain transactions at an undervalue
- Citation: 1986 c. 45
- Territorial extent: England and Wales; Scotland (in part) (Note: Section 440.); Northern Ireland (in part) (Note: Section 441.)

Dates
- Royal assent: 25 July 1986
- Commencement: 19 December 1986 (Note: Section 443. The Insolvency Act 1985 (Commencement No. 5) Order 1986.)
Other legislation
Amends	Landlord and Tenant Act 1709; Bills of Sale Act (1878) Amendment Act 1882; Deeds of Arrangement Act 1914; Bankruptcy Act 1914; Third Parties (Rights against Insurers) Act 1930; Companies Act 1947; Agricultural Marketing Act 1958; Land Charges Act 1972; Recess Elections Act 1975; Restrictive Trade Practices Act 1976; British Aerospace Act 1980; See § Repealed enactments
Repeals/revokes	See § Repealed enactments
Amended by	Drug Trafficking Offences Act 1986; Income and Corporation Taxes Act 1988; Road Traffic (Consequential Provisions) Act 1988; Court of Session Act 1988; Law Reform (Miscellaneous Provisions) (Scotland) Act 1990; Tribunals and Inquiries Act 1992; Pension Schemes Act 1993; Statute Law (Repeals) Act 1993; Drug Trafficking Act 1994; Gas Act 1995; Employment Tribunals Act 1996; Employment Rights Act 1996; Trusts of Land and Appointment of Trustees Act 1996; Scotland Act 1998; Postal Services Act 2000; Abolition of Feudal Tenure etc. (Scotland) Act 2000; Land Registration Act 2002; Commonhold and Leasehold Reform Act 2002; Mental Capacity Act 2005; Government of Wales Act 2006; Postal Services Act 2011; Criminal Justice and Courts Act 2015; Corporate Insolvency and Governance Act 2020; Sentencing Act 2020
Relates to	Company Directors Disqualification Act 1986

Status: Amended

Text of statute as originally enacted

Revised text of statute as amended

Text of the Insolvency Act 1986 as in force today (including any amendments) within the United Kingdom, from legislation.gov.uk.

The Insolvency Act 1986 (c. 45) is an act of the Parliament of the United Kingdom that provides the legal platform for all matters relating to personal and corporate insolvency in the UK.

== Background ==
The act followed the publication and most of the findings in the Cork Report, including the introduction of the Individual Voluntary Arrangement (IVA) and Company Voluntary Arrangement (CVA) procedures.

Elements of the act were updated by the Enterprise Act 2002, which came into effect on 1 April 2004 and introduced amongst other things the popular "out-of-court" administration route, and the allocation of a limited amount of funding released from assets, known as the "prescribed part", which could be made available to support ordinary unsecured creditors ahead of secured creditors. This limit was initially £600,000, but it was increased to £800,000 by the Insolvency Act 1986 (Prescribed Part) (Amendment) Order 2020 (SI 211/2020) on 6 April 2020 to maintain the real value of the limit.

Those considering the main act should also refer to the Insolvency Rules 1986 and numerous Regulations and other amending legislation since 1986, and also to the best practice which applies to the administration of formal insolvency matters set out in the Statements of Insolvency Practice (SIPs) approved by the insolvency practitioner authorising bodies.

Further updates to the act were made by the Corporate Insolvency and Governance Act 2020, which provided a moratorium for companies that were likely to become insolvent and gave additional reliefs for businesses that were adversely impacted by the COVID-19 pandemic.

== Provisions ==
The act essentially governs issues relating to personal bankruptcy and Individual Voluntary Arrangements and all administrative orders relating to company insolvency.

=== Companies winding up ===
- Part I - Company Voluntary Arrangements
- Part II - Administration Orders
- Part III - Receivership (ss 22-72H)
  - Chapter I - Receivers and Managers (England and Wales)
  - Chapter II - Receivers (Scotland)
  - Chapter III - Receivers Powers in Great Britain as a whole
- Part IV - Winding Up of Companies Registered Under the Companies Acts (ss 73-219)
  - Chapter I - Preliminary
  - Chapter II - Voluntary Winding Up (Introductory and General)
  - Chapter III - Members' Voluntary Winding Up (ss 91-96)
  - Chapter IV - Creditors' Voluntary Winding Up (ss 97-106)
  - Chapter V - Provisions Applying to both kinds of Winding up
  - Chapter VI - Winding Up by the Court (ss 117-162)
  - Chapter VII - Liquidators
  - Chapter VIII - Provisions of general application in winding up
  - Chapter IX - Dissolution of companies after winding up
  - Chapter X - Malpractice before and during liquidation; penalisation of companies and company officers; investigations and prosecutions (ss 206-219). Section 213 lies within this part, and provides for individuals who are aware that business has been carried on with the intent to defraud the company's creditors to be called upon to contribute to the company’s assets. Section 216 prevents the "re-use" of a company name or very similar name when a new company takes the place of a company being liquidated.
- Part V - Winding Up Unregistered Companies (ss 220-229)
- Part VI - Miscellaneous Provisions applying to Companies which are Insolvent or in Liquidation
- Part VII - Interpretation for first group of parts

=== Insolvency of individuals – bankruptcy ===
- Part VIII - Individual Voluntary Arrangements
- Part IX - Bankruptcy (ss 264-371)
- Chapter I - Bankruptcy Petitions - Bankruptcy Orders
- Chapter II - Protection of Bankrupt's Estate and Investigation of his Affairs
- Chapter III - Trustees in Bankruptcy
- Chapter IV - Administration by Trustee
- Chapter V - Effect of Bankruptcy on certain rights, transactions etc.
- Chapter VI - Bankruptcy Offences
- Chapter VII - Powers of Court in Bankruptcy
- Part X - Individual Insolvency: General Provisions
- Part XI - Interpretation for second group of parts

=== Miscellaneous matters ===
- Part XII - Preferential debts in company and individual insolvency
- Part XIII - Insolvency Practitioners and their qualifications (ss 338-398)
- Part XIV - Public Administration (ss 399-410)
- Part XV - Subordinate Legislation
- Part XVI - Provisions against debt avoidance (England and Wales Only)
- Part XVII - Miscellaneous and General
- Part XVIII - Interpretation
- Part XIX - Final Provisions

==== Repealed enactments ====
Section 438 of the act repealed 6 enactments, listed in schedule 12 to the act.

Enactments repealed by section 438
Citation	Short title	Extent of repeal
1970 c. 8	Insolvency Services (Accounting and Investment) Act 1970	The whole act.
1976 c. 60	Insolvency Act 1976	Section 3.
1985 c. 6	Companies Act 1985	In section 463(4), the words "Subject to section 617".
1985 c. 6	Companies Act 1985	Sections 467 to 485.
1985 c. 6	Companies Act 1985	In section 486, in the definition of "company" the words "other than in Chapter II of this Part"; and the definitions of "instrument of appointment", "prescribed", "receiver" and "register of charges".
1985 c. 6	Companies Act 1985	Sections 488 to 650.
1985 c. 6	Companies Act 1985	Sections 659 to 664.
1985 c. 6	Companies Act 1985	Sections 665 to 674.
1985 c. 6	Companies Act 1985	Section 709(4).
1985 c. 6	Companies Act 1985	Section 710(4).
1985 c. 6	Companies Act 1985	Section 724.
1985 c. 6	Companies Act 1985	Schedule 16.
1985 c. 6	Companies Act 1985	In Schedule 24, the entries relating to section 467; all entries thereafter up to and including section 641(2); and the entry relating to section 710(4).
1985 c. 65	Insolvency Act 1985	Sections 1 to 11.
1985 c. 65	Insolvency Act 1985	Section 15.
1985 c. 65	Insolvency Act 1985	Section 17.
1985 c. 65	Insolvency Act 1985	Section 19.
1985 c. 65	Insolvency Act 1985	Sections 20 to 107.
1985 c. 65	Insolvency Act 1985	Section 108(1) and (3) to (7).
1985 c. 65	Insolvency Act 1985	Sections 109 to 211.
1985 c. 65	Insolvency Act 1985	Sections 212 to 214.
1985 c. 65	Insolvency Act 1985	Section 216.
1985 c. 65	Insolvency Act 1985	Section 217(1) to (3).
1985 c. 65	Insolvency Act 1985	Sections 221 to 234.
1985 c. 65	Insolvency Act 1985	In section 235, subsections (2) to (5).
1985 c. 65	Insolvency Act 1985	In section 236, subsections (3) to (5).
1985 c. 65	Insolvency Act 1985	In Schedule 1, paragraphs 1 to 4, and sub-paragraph (4) of paragraph 5.
1985 c. 65	Insolvency Act 1985	Schedules 3 to 5.
1985 c. 65	Insolvency Act 1985	In Schedule 6, paragraphs 5, 6, 9, 15 to 17, 20 to 22, 25 to 44 and 48 to 52.
1985 c. 65	Insolvency Act 1985	Schedule 7.
1985 c. 65	Insolvency Act 1985	In Schedule 9, paragraphs 1 and 4 to 24.
1985 c. 65	Insolvency Act 1985	Schedule 10.
1985 c. 66	Bankruptcy (Scotland) Act 1985	In Schedule 7, paragraphs 19 to 22.
1986 c. 44	Gas Act 1986	In Schedule 7, paragraph 31.

=== Schedules ===
- Schedule B1, on the new administration procedure after the Enterprise Act 2002.
