= National Foundation for Credit Counseling =

Financial counseling organization

- Founded: January 1951
- Type: NPO
- Location(s): Members serving all 50 states, Washington DC and Puerto Rico
- Services: Bankruptcy Counseling, Budget Counseling, Credit Counseling, Housing Counseling, Financial Education, Reverse Mortgage Counseling, Student Loan Counseling,
- Website: www.nfcc.org

The National Foundation for Credit Counseling (NFCC), founded in 1951, is the largest and longest-serving nonprofit financial counseling organization in the United States. NFCC member agencies provide access to financial counseling services for consumers. The organization's headquarters is in Washington, DC and is led by Mike Croxson, their Chief Executive Officer.

== Services ==
NFCC member agencies provide financial reviews and education to more than a million consumers each year in person, over the phone, or online. Every NFCC member agency client receives comprehensive money management services based on their individual needs. NFCC member agencies provide a variety of services including:

- Credit/Debt Counseling
- Bankruptcy Counseling
- Housing Counseling- includes first-time homebuyers, reverse mortgage counseling, foreclosure prevention,
- Debt Management Plans
- Credit Report Reviews
- Financial Education
- Additionally, one-third of NFCC members are multi-service agencies specializing in community-based social service programs such as youth mentoring, foster care, and substance abuse programs.

The NFCC provides counselor certification for nonprofit credit counselors employed by their member agencies in the areas of credit card debt, student loans, housing and small business owners coaching.

Consumers who seek help figuring out how to repay their debts or reach their financial goals contact the NFCC for assistance with their financial services needs, including credit counseling, bankruptcy, financial education, and housing counseling. NFCC member agencies set their own fees and fees vary based on state regulations. The NFCC provides funding for scholarships based on display of need of the consumer.

The NFCC has member offices in every state and U.S. territory, including Puerto Rico and the District of Columbia.

== Standards ==
Every NFCC member agency is accredited by the Council on Accreditation (COA) to ensure standards are maintained as a nonprofit financial counseling agency. COA is an independent, third party, nonprofit accrediting organization.

See also

- Credit counseling
- Debt settlement

== International expansion ==
In 2017 the NFCC extended its service beyond the United States by adding its first International Affiliate. The Credit Counselling Society, Canada's largest non-profit credit counseling organization, became the first International Affiliate after becoming certified by the Council on Accreditation (COA).
