= Uniform Debt-Management Services Act =

The Uniform Debt-Management Services Act was promulgated in 2005 by the Uniform Law Commissioners. It provides the states with a comprehensive act governing national administration of debt counseling and management in a fair and effective way.

Consumer debt counseling and management services have been available to individuals with serious credit problems going back to the 1950s. There are generally two kinds of services that have been available. Some of these services have provided counseling coupled with assisting debtors in establishing programs to pay off debts over an extended time. Others have provided consolidation and management services, in which agreements are reached with creditors to settle on a percentage of debt. Most of these services have collected a periodic amount from the debtors from which payment to creditors has been made. The general objective of these services has been debt satisfaction without resort to bankruptcy.

The history of debt counseling and management services is checkered. There have been numerous abuses and efforts to counter abuses statutorily in many states. These services have been criticized for their efforts to steer debtors away from bankruptcy when it may have been more advantageous and less costly to debtors to file. Many states prohibit for-profit debt management services while permitting nonprofit debt counseling services. One of the continuing controversies is whether for profit services should be allowed even if regulated.

However, federal bankruptcy reform effective in 2005 has changed the perspective on such services. For an individual to file for Chapter 7 bankruptcy, that individual will in most cases have to show that consumer debt counseling/management has been sought and attempted.

In 2005, just in time for consideration in the state legislatures, the Uniform Law Commissioners promulgated the Uniform Debt-Management Services Act (UDMSA). It provides the states with a comprehensive act governing these services that will mean national administration of debt counseling and management in a fair and effective way.

In March 2008, several important amendments were made to the UDMSA. With these amendments, more than 20 states are executed to introduce the act in 2009.

UDMSA may be divided into three basic parts: registration of services, service-debtor agreements and enforcement. Each part contributes to the comprehensive quality of the Uniform Act.

Registration

No service may enter into an agreement with any debtor in a state without registering as a consumer debt-management service in that state. Registration requires submission of detailed information concerning the service, including its financial condition, the identity of principals, locations at which service will be offered, form for agreements with debtors and business history in other jurisdictions. To register, a service must have an effective insurance policy against fraud, dishonesty, theft and the like in an amount no less than $250,000.00. It must also provide a security bond of a minimum of $50,000.00 which has the state administrator as a beneficiary. If a registration substantially duplicates one in another state, the service may offer proof of registration in that other state to satisfy the registration requirements in a state. A satisfactory application will result in a certificate to do business from the administrator. A yearly renewal is required.

Agreements

In order to enter into agreements with debtors, there is a disclosure requirement respecting fees and services to be offered, and the risks and benefits of entering into such a contract. The service must offer counseling services from a certified counselor and a plan must be created in consultation by the counselor for debt-management service to commence. The contents of the agreements and fees that may be charged are set by the statute. There is a penalty-free three-day right of rescission on the part of the debtor. The debtor may cancel the agreement also after 30 days, but may be subject to fees if that occurs. The service may terminate the agreement if required payments are delinquent for at least 60 days.

Any payments for creditors received from a debtor must be kept in a trust account that may not be used to hold any other funds of the service. There are strict accounting requirements and periodic reporting requirements respecting funds held.

With respect to debt settlement services, the UDMSA provides for an overall fee cap based on the amount saved by the consumer (30% of the difference between the principal amount owed upon initiation of the service and the amount the debt is ultimately settled for).

Enforcement

The Act prohibits specific acts on the part of a service including: misappropriation of funds in trust; settlement for more than 50% of a debt with a creditor without a debtor’s consent; gifts or premiums to enter into an agreement; and representation that settlement has occurred without certification from a creditor. Enforcement of the Uniform Act occurs at two levels, the administrator and the individual level. The administrator has investigative powers, power to order an individual to cease and desist; power to assess a civil penalty up to $10,000.00, and the power to bring a civil action. An individual may bring a civil action for compensatory damages, including triple damages if a service obtains payments not authorized in the Uniform Act, and may seek punitive damages and attorney’s fees. A service has a good faith mistake defense against liability. The statute of limitations pertaining to an action by the administrator is four years, and two years for a private right of action.

Banks as regulated entities under other law are not subject to the Uniform Act, as are other kinds of activities that are incidental to other functions performed. For example, a title insurer that provides bill-paying service that is incidental to title insurance is not subject to it.

UDMSA provides comprehensive regulation of debt counseling and management services. It becomes an essential part of the law of creditor and debtor as bankruptcy reform enacted by Congress in 2005 takes effect.

== UDMSA & Debt Settlement Trade Associations ==
Due to the rise of debt settlement as a debt relief alternative to bankruptcy, groups working in the industry established trade associations to help secure industry standards that will protect consumers against unethical business practices. These trade associations were also established to lobby state governments to adopt the recommendations of the UDMSA. The two major trade associations are the United States Organization for Bankruptcy Alternatives (USOBA) , and The Association of Settlement Companies (TASC) .

These organizations publish on their websites information about the UDMSA, debt settlement and the debt settlement industry.
