= National Credit Regulator =

South African government agency

National Credit Regulator (NCR) is a South African government agency that regulates the credit industry in South Africa.

The NCR was established under National Credit Act 34 of 2005 (the Act).

The NCRt is tasked with carrying out education, research, policy development, registration of industry participants, investigation of complaints, and ensuring enforcement of the Act. The Act requires the NCR to promote an accessible credit market, particularly to address the needs of historically disadvantaged persons, low income persons, and remote, isolated or low density communities. The NCR is also tasked with the registration of credit providers, credit bureaus and debt counsellors; and enforcement of compliance with the Act. It is active in promoting financial inclusion policy and a member of the Alliance for Financial Inclusion.

== The role of the National Credit Regulator ==
The National Credit Regulator has to

- Register credit providers, credit bureau and debt counsellors, and monitor the conduct of these parties;
- Educate and create awareness of the protection which the Act offers;
- Research the credit market and monitor access to credit and the cost of credit to identify factors that may undermine access to credit, competitiveness and consumer protection;
- Advise government on policy and legislation;
- Receive and investigate complaints and ensure that consumer rights are protected, and refer these to the correct agencies and;
- Enforce the Act and take action against contravening institutions.

The NCR also registers Payment Distribution Agencies (known as PDAs) - who handle money on behalf of consumers under debt review and help distribute their funds to credit providers; as well as Alternative Dispute Resolution Agents (known as ADRs) - who assist resolve consumer disputes with credit providers.

== The National Consumer Tribunal ==
The National Consumer Tribunal (known as the NCT) hears cases on non compliance with the Act, issues fines and provides redress to consumers.

Consumers, Payment Distribution Agencies, Alternative Dispute Resolution Agents, Debt Counsellors and credit providers may appeal to the Tribunal against any decision of the NCR .

The Tribunal is a separate institution that is independent of the National Credit Regulator. The Tribunal currently consists of a Chairperson, Deputy Chairperson and 15 Tribunal Members. The NCT is an agency within the Department of Trade, Industry and Competition (DTIC).

== See also ==
- List of financial supervisory authorities by country

== Sources ==
- Debtfree DIGI - SA's Debt Counselling and Debt Review industry magazine
- National Credit Regulator
- Debt Counselling SA
- The National Debt Review Center
- The National Consumer Tribunal
- Sandton Debt Counselling
