= Credit Solutions of America =

American debt settlement company

- Company type: Private company
- Industry: Financial services
- Founded: 2003 in Dallas, Texas
- Defunct: 2012
- Fate: Closed down after regulatory issues
- Headquarters: Richardson, Texas, United States
- Key people: Mr. Sisson, President
- Products: debt settlement
- Number of employees: 1,200 (2012)

Credit Solutions of America (CSA) was an American debt settlement company based in Dallas, Texas. At its peak it had more than 1,200 employees and served more than 250,000 customers. It was established in 2003 and closed down in 2012.

== Background ==
Debt settlement companies negotiate with creditors to accept reduced payments on unsecured debt, like credit cards and medical debt. CSA settled more than $1.1 billion of debt from 2003 to 2012, with an average settlement of 45 cents on the dollar.

In 2007, the company was recognized by JD Powers and Associates, for excellence in satisfying its customers. CSA had also been certified as ISO 9000:2008 from BSI, which was a result of ongoing company wide audits by an independent third party to ensure quality management systems.

The company had a community service group called "CSA Cares," through which employees volunteered over 20,000 hours with Dallas/Fort Worth area nonprofit organizations.

A March 2010, CBS Early Show story on the debt settlement industry criticized Credit Solutions of America's business practices, and provided consumer advice for debt settlement counseling.
