= Credit agreements in South Africa =

Credit agreements in South Africa are regulated under the National Credit Act (NCA) No. 34 of 2005, which promotes responsible lending and protects consumers from unfair credit practices. Replacing the Credit Agreements Act of 1980, the NCA applies to various credit forms, including loans, credit cards, and installment sales. It also established the National Credit Regulator (NCR) and National Consumer Tribunal to oversee compliance and resolve disputes, ensuring a fair and transparent credit market.

== Credit agreement ==
An agreement is a credit agreement if it provides for a deferral or delay of payment, and if there is a fee or interest charged for the deferred payment. The Act does not require that a credit agreement be in writing and signed by both parties, although this is implied throughout the Act. A credit agreement may be a credit facility, a credit transaction or a credit guarantee (or a combination of these). These three terms are defined in section 8 of the Act.

=== Credit facility ===
A credit facility is an agreement in terms of which a credit provider supplies goods or services, or pays an amount to the consumer. The consumer's obligation to pay the price or repay the money is deferred, in exchange for which the consumer pays interest and fees. Examples of a credit facility are credit advanced

- on an overdrawn cheque account in terms of an overdraft facility; or
- on a credit card account.

=== Credit transaction ===
A “credit transaction” may refer any one of a number of different types of transactions. Most important for present purposes are the follow

Installment agreements - In terms of instalment agreements, movable goods (like furniture, clothing or a car) are sold, the price is paid in instalments, and the item is delivered to the consumer. The consumer becomes owner only once all instalments have been paid.

Unsecured money loans - Unsecured money loans are usually smaller money loans (micro-loans) re-payable in installments, where the lender is given no security for re-payment of the debt. Micro lending as a category of the NCR usually speaks to credit providers that can borrow a maximum amount of R8 000 for a period of up to 6 months.

Pawn transactions - In terms of pawn transactions, money is lent and the borrower provides an item of property as security, the resale value of which is greater than the loan. The creditor is entitled to sell the property if the money is not repaid by an agreed date, and to keep the proceeds of the sale.

Mortgage agreements - Mortgage agreements are money loans secured by the registration of a mortgage bond over land, the proceeds of which are usually used to buy land or housing.

Secured loans - In terms of secured loans, money is paid, and the credit provider receives a pledge of any movable property or something else of value as security for repayment of the loan.

Leases of movable goods - Leases of movable goods—that is, not land or housing—would include, for example, a fax machine or a motor car, with rent being paid in instalments, together with fees and interest. (If interest and fees are not charged, it will not be a credit transaction in terms of the Act). The total instalments will usually amount to the value of the item let. Once all instalments are paid, ownership passes to the consumer. This is contrary to the common law of lease. If, however, the agreement provides that ownership will always remain with the lessor, it will still be a credit transaction in terms of the Act.

=== Credit guarantees ===
In terms of a credit guarantee, a third party agrees to pay to a creditor the amount due by a consumer, on demand (as, for example, in the case of suretyship, in terms of which personal security is provided for the debt of another person resulting from an overdrawn Cheque account).

=== Incidental credit agreements ===
Incidental credit agreements occur when goods or services are provided to a consumer over a period of time and a fee or interest is charged only if payment is not made by an agreed date. Examples include

- accounts for municipal services, such as water or electricity; and
- sales of clothing where no interest is charged provided that the account is paid by a certain date.

Incidental credit agreements do not fall under the definition of credit agreements

== See also ==
- Credit (finance)
- South African law
- Credit counseling

== Notes ==
- Otto The National Credit Act Explained (LexisNexis, 2006).
- JW Scholtz et al. Guide to the National Credit Act [looseleaf] (LexisNexis, 2011).
