= National Foundation for Debt Management =

The National Foundation for Debt Management (NFDM) is a United States credit counseling agency. The organization is incorporated, but is organized as a non-profit. This group focuses on consumer education on debt practices. They also focus on distributing personal finance information to the public.
