= Credit counseling =

Process to help debtors

Credit counseling (known in the United Kingdom as debt counseling) is a process used to help individual debtors overcome their debt through financial education, budgeting, debt management plans (DMPs) – known in the United Kingdom as the individual voluntary arrangement (IVA) – and a variety of other tools with the goal of reducing and ultimately eliminating debt.

Credit counseling is often provided by credit counseling agencies (CCAs). These agencies work with consumers to help them understand their financial situations and explore the best ways to repay their debts.

Regulations on credit counseling and credit counseling agencies vary by country and sometimes within regions of the countries themselves. In the United States, individuals filing bankruptcy are required to receive credit counseling.

== Overview ==
In the United States, the modern practice known as ‘‘credit counseling’’ was initiated by creditor banks and credit card companies during the mid-1960s to address the growing volume of consumer debt and personal bankruptcies. Although there is variation from country to country and even in regions within countries, consumer debt is primarily made up of home loans, credit card debt, student loans, medical debt and car loans.

Credit counseling is provided by credit counseling agencies (CCAs). Most reputable CCAs are nonprofits with low fees that offer services through local offices, online or by phone.

Credit counseling agencies are staffed by counselors who are certified and trained in the areas of consumer credit, money and debt management, and budgeting. When a consumer works with a CCA, their counselor reviews their financial situation and helps develop a personalized plan to pay off debt.

The counselor might recommend that the consumer enroll in a debt management plan to help repay their unsecured debts. The counselor would then develop a consolidated payment schedule with the consumer and their creditors. The creditors may agree to lower the interest rates, and may waive fees associated with the account. The consumer makes a single monthly payment to the credit counseling agency, which distributes those funds to the creditors enrolled in the debt management plan.

In the United States, nonprofit credit counseling agencies have historically been funded in part by "fair share" payments: creditors participating in a debt management plan voluntarily return to the agency a percentage of the payments they receive through the plan. Fair share rates declined from 12–15 percent of plan payments in the 1990s to 8 percent in 2001 and about 5 percent by 2010, and creditors increasingly tied the payments to consumers' completion of plans.

Other debt reduction strategies may include debt consolidation loans, the debt snowball method, reverse mortgages and other options. In debt consolidation, one new loan replaces multiple unsecured credit debts. The debt snowball method is a budgeting approach that addresses debt systematically by paying off the smallest debt first, then rolling the money that used to go to that bill to pay off the next smallest debt and so on. Reverse mortgages allow older homeowners to immediately access the equity they have built up in their homes and defer payment of the loan until they die, sell or move out of the home.

== Criticism ==
Globally, some debt reduction methods have been associated with predatory practices. Some companies claiming to help consumers fail to meet required standards, charge unlawful or unreasonable fees, fail to provide affordable solutions for consumers, and neglect to make customers aware of free debt services available elsewhere.

In the United States, credit counseling and debt management plans are sometimes confused with risky debt settlement programs, but the two strategies are significantly different. Credit counseling agencies work with creditors and secure their approval for each debt management plan. Debt settlement company clients may be subject to collection efforts, including negative credit reporting and lawsuits, while the companies attempt to negotiate settlements.

Debt management plans also involve costs and limitations. Under a DMP, the consumer repays 100 percent of the principal owed, plus interest at reduced rates, typically over three to five years; creditors are generally unwilling to reduce principal on debts enrolled in a plan. Enrollment typically requires closing the credit card accounts included in the plan. Creditor participation in a DMP is voluntary, and consumers are screened for eligibility; a 2006–2007 industry survey found that 30 percent of counseled consumers could not qualify for a plan because of insufficient income.

Counseling agencies have historically been funded in part through "fair share" payments — a percentage of plan payments returned to the agency by creditors — an arrangement that observers have described as a potential conflict of interest, since it can create incentives to enroll consumers in repayment plans even when other options might serve them better. Rigorous independent research on DMP outcomes remains limited, though available studies have found that consumers who enroll in and begin plans experience lower rates of bankruptcy and greater credit score improvement than similar consumers who do not enroll.

Debt settlement programs are typically offered by for-profit companies to people with significant credit card debt. These programs are aimed at negotiating a “settlement,” or lump sum payment, with the creditor that is less than what is owed. However, debt settlement companies typically charge high fees, any amount that is forgiven is usually considered taxable income, and the consumer’s credit score can be significantly negatively impacted.

== Regulations by country ==
=== United States ===
In the United States, credit counseling agencies are subject to regulation by the Federal Trade Commission (FTC), the nation’s consumer protection agency; the Internal Review Service (IRS); and the U.S. Trustee Program (USTP) at the Department of Justice. Different states may regulate debt management plans individually, and Attorneys General are empowered to protect state citizens from fraud. Some states regulate credit counseling companies, such as by requiring licensure and limiting fees. Many states do not have laws that directly regulate the credit counseling industry.

Under Section 501(q) of the Internal Revenue Code, enacted as part of the Pension Protection Act of 2006, revenue that a tax-exempt credit counseling organization receives from creditors attributable to debt management plan services may not exceed 50 percent of its total revenue; the cap was phased in for existing organizations between 2008 and 2011. Following the cap, some creditors shifted support to grants not tied to debt management plan services, and client fees and government housing counseling funds grew as a share of agency revenue.

Two professional membership organizations represent credit counseling agencies in the United States. The National Foundation for Credit Counseling (NFCC), established in 1951, and the Financial Counseling Association of America (FCAA), established in 1993, set industry standards, provide consumer protection guidelines and offer compliance oversight. The NFCC and FCAA refer consumers to member agencies that meet the industry’s rigorous ethical standards to act in the best interest of the consumer. Member agencies help consumers by providing financial education, budget help, credit counseling, student loan counseling, debt management plans, housing counseling and bankruptcy counseling and education.

=== United Kingdom ===
In the United Kingdom, the Financial Conduct Authority is responsible for the regulation of consumer credit and has established a Debt Management Plan Protocol. It can impose fines for improper conduct.

=== European Union ===
Elsewhere in the European Union, regulation and non-regulation of Credit counseling agencies and their approaches, including DMPs, are widely varied. In Sweden, guidelines for credit counseling are loosely provided by the Swedish Confederation of Professional Employees (TCO) and creditors are encouraged to use them in lieu of the court system. In Ireland, the Irish Congress of Trade Unions (ICTU) provides debt resolution information directly to debtors. In Latvia, a debt advisory company called LAKRA works with employers to assist indebted employees.

=== Canada ===
The Financial Consumer Agency of Canada (FCAC) advises Canadians to do their research and find a trustworthy organization and a qualified counselor. They suggest making sure an agency is in good standing with a provincial or national association. They recommend looking carefully at the agency's advertising to see if it sounds too good to be true. Claims or misrepresentations to look out for can include repaying only a fraction of your debt, quickly fixing your credit score, or claiming to be part of a government program.

They also suggest consumers inquire about an agency's services, costs, and counselor qualifications. The FCAC has also warns Canadians to be careful of companies offering to help them pay off their debt or repair their credit. Things to watch out for include guarantees to solve debt problems and using high interest loans to pay off debt. Some of these companies also claim that they can file a consumer proposal on behalf of a consumer. However, the FCAC points out that only a qualified licensed insolvency trustee can help someone with a consumer proposal or bankruptcy.

=== South Africa ===
The National Credit Regulator (NCR) was established as the regulator under the National Credit Act No. 34 of 2005 (The Act) and is responsible for the regulation of the South African credit industry. It is tasked with carrying out education, research, policy development, registration of industry participants, investigation of complaints, and ensuring the enforcement of the Act.

The NCR is also tasked with the registration of credit providers, credit bureau and debt counsellors; and with the enforcement of compliance with the Act. Debt Counseling was introduced and enforced in 2007. This enabled over-indebted consumers to seek relief in accordance to the National Credit Act (NCA). The NCA has been amended several times since its inception and various new regulations published.

In South Africa debt counselling (as done through the courts by NCR registered debt counsellors) is seen as legitimate and legally recognised process while the use of the term credit counselling is often associated with scams or fake services that are not regulated.

The Debt Counsellors Association of South Africa has a list of trusted debt counsellors https://www.dcasa.co.za/debt-counsellor-near-me/

=== Malaysia ===
In Malaysia, credit counseling services are primarily associated with the Agensi Kaunseling dan Pengurusan Kredit, an agency established by Bank Negara Malaysia in 2006 to promote financial literacy and assist individuals in managing debt. AKPK provides financial education, budgeting advice, and debt management programmes aimed at helping consumers regain financial stability through structured repayment plans.

Credit counseling in Malaysia typically involves assessing an individual’s financial situation, followed by guidance on money management, restructuring of outstanding debts, and negotiation with financial institutions where necessary. Services are generally focused on improving long-term financial behaviour while reducing immediate financial distress.

In addition to government-linked initiatives, private sector platforms have emerged to complement the ecosystem by offering alternative or supplementary advisory services in line with the Consumer Credit Act 2025 (CCA 2025). These may include digital financial advisory tools, debt restructuring assistance, and consumer advocacy support. One such platform is Hammersmith DCMA (Debt Counselling & Management Agency), which provides financial advisory, debt management solutions, and a complaint management system designed to represent consumers’ concerns to relevant stakeholders.

The Malaysian credit counseling landscape reflects a broader approach that combines financial education, structured debt repayment, and consumer protection mechanisms to address rising household debt and promote responsible financial management.

== See also ==
- National Foundation for Debt Management
