= Debt snowball method =

Personal finance strategy

The debt snowball method is a debt-reduction strategy, whereby one who owes on more than one account pays off the accounts starting with the smallest balances first, while paying the minimum payment on larger debts. Once the smallest debt is paid off, one proceeds to the next larger debt, and so forth, proceeding to the largest ones last. This method is sometimes contrasted with the debt stacking method, also called the debt avalanche method, where one pays off accounts on the highest interest rate first.

The debt snowball method is most often applied to repaying revolving credit – such as credit cards. Under the method, extra cash is dedicated to paying debts with the smallest amount owed.

== Methodology ==
The basic steps in the debt snowball method are:

1. List all debts in ascending order from smallest balance to largest. This is the method's most distinctive feature, in that the order is determined by amount owed, not the rate of interest charged.
2. Commit to pay the minimum payment on every debt.
3. Determine how much extra can be applied towards the smallest debt.
4. Pay the minimum payment plus the extra amount towards that smallest debt until it is paid off. Note that some lenders (mortgage lenders, car companies) will apply extra amounts towards the next payment; in order for the method to work the lenders need to be contacted and told that extra payments are to go directly toward principal reduction. Credit cards usually apply the whole payment during the current cycle.
5. Once a debt is paid in full, add the old minimum payment (plus any extra amount available) from the first debt to the minimum payment on the second smallest debt, and apply the new sum to repaying the second smallest debt.
6. Repeat until all debts are paid in full.

In theory, by the time the final debts are reached, the extra amount paid toward the larger debts will grow quickly, similar to a snowball rolling downhill gathering more snow, hence the name.

The theory appeals to human psychology: by paying the smaller debts first, the individual, couple, or family sees fewer bills as more individual debts are paid off, thus giving ongoing positive feedback on their progress towards eliminating their debt.

== Pros and cons ==
In either method, fixing the cause of the debt (this does not include one's home loan) must be addressed, that is balance of income vs spending.

=== Pros ===
The debt snowball method goal is to motivate the person in debt to continue paying off the debt. There is an emotional reward associated with quickly paying off a small debt, which can motivate people to continue with the plan.

=== Cons ===
The Debt Avalanche method, in contrast, focuses on paying off highest interest rate first and will result in less payments to interest assuming one follows through with the plan. The small debt, with lower interest rate will stay around longer. The debt snowball method has larger high-interest debts around longer, thus may take more time to pay off.

== Example ==
An example of the debt snowball method in action is shown below. In a real payoff scenario the different interest rates on debts will affect payoff times and might make the method less efficient than other plans. However, for the sake of illustrating the method, the example ignores accruing interest.

A person has the following amounts of debt and additional funds available to pay debt (the debt is listed with the smallest balance first, as recommended by the method):

- Credit Card A – $250 balance – $25/month minimum
- Credit Card B – $500 balance – $26/month minimum
- Car payment – $2500 balance – $150/month minimum
- Personal loan – $5000 balance – $200/month minimum
- The debtor has an additional $100/month which can be devoted to repayment of debt.

The additional $100 is first directed toward Card A and, together with the $25 minimum payment, pays off the balance in two months. This is illustrated in the following table, with the prioritized debt indicated in bold.

Month	Card A	Card B	Car	Personal
0	**250**	500	2500	5000
1	**125**	474	2350	4800
2	**0**	448	2200	4600

Paying off Card A leaves $125 free for additional payment: the original $100, plus the $25 previously committed to minimum payments on Card A. This amount is added to Card B's $26 minimum payment, thereby paying it off in three more months.

Month	Card B	Car	Personal
2	**448**	2200	4600
3	**297**	2050	4400
4	**146**	1900	4200
5	**0**	1750	4000

A total of $151 is then free for additional payment, and is applied to the car loan for a total monthly car payment of $301. This pays off the car loan in another six months.

Month	Car	Personal
5	1750	4000
6	1449	3800
7	1148	3600
8	847	3400
9	546	3200
10	245	3000
11	0	2800

The available $301 would then be added to the personal loan's minimum payment for a total payment of $501. This would pay off the personal loan in another six months, leaving the debtor debt-free after a total of 17 months. Since the example omits interest, any payment order could pay off the debts in the same amount of time, but the snowball method avoids long waits between successive payoffs. If the debtor had prioritized debts in the reverse order, the first payoff (Card A) would have taken ten months and the rest an additional seven.

== Effectiveness ==
In situations where one debt has both a higher interest rate and higher balance than another debt, the debt snowball method prioritizes the smaller debt. From a purely hypothetical perspective paying the higher interest debt would be more effective, though this line of reasoning also assumes mathematical factors are more important than behavioral or emotional factors in reducing unwanted debts.

Several researchers have found the snowball method is more likely to lead to debt elimination, despite the snowball's perceived flaws when considered from a purely mathematical perspective. In a 2012 study by Northwestern's Kellogg School of Management, researchers found that "consumers who tackle small balances first are likelier to eliminate their overall debt" than trying to pay off high interest rate balances first. A 2016 study in Harvard Business Review came to a similar conclusion:

We tested a variety of hypotheses and ultimately determined that it is not the size of the repayment or how little is left on a card after a payment that has the biggest impact on people's perception of progress; rather it's what portion of the balance they succeed in paying off. Thus focusing on paying down the account with the smallest balance tends to have the most powerful effect on people's sense of progress – and therefore their motivation to continue paying down their debts.

Author and radio host Dave Ramsey, a proponent of the debt snowball method, concedes that an analysis of the subject from a purely mathematical and interest rate perspective leans toward paying the highest interest debt first. However, Ramsey also states his opinion that personal finance is "20 percent head knowledge and 80 percent behavior" and he argues people trying to reduce debt often need "quick wins" (i.e., paying off the smallest debt) in order to remain motivated toward debt reduction. Ramsey Solutions has done internal studies which found debt snowball method tends to be more effective in real-world situations.

Research by Moty Amar and colleagues agreed that debtors are inclined to pay small debts first, which they attributed to "debt account aversion", i.e., the desire to reduce the number of outstanding debts regardless of balance or interest expense and focus on a "tangible sense of progress". However, they also found when debtors in a laboratory simulation are restricted from paying off small debts in full, and are instead shown the interest that will accrue as a result of their choice, they tend to make the mathematically optimal decision.

Research by Evan McAllister, based on survey and research data from the Federal Reserve, found a slight majority of people report the avalanche is more effective than the snowball. McAllister adds the snowball may be more effective for some people, and has the added benefit of potentially helping change financial habits for the better.

A 2023 paper by Nurazleena Ismail and Hilmiah Ahmad stated both avalanche and snowball methods have their merits and shortcomings, and also noted reducing unwanted debt levels had cognitive elements that can be as important as mathematical analysis. The authors cited nudge theory to argue individual personality traits must be considered and there is no ideal debt payment method that will work for everyone in all scenarios.

== See also ==
- Personal finance
- Alternative financial service
- Debt consolidation
- Debt management plan
