= Medical debt =

Debt incurred by individuals due to health care costs

Medical debt refers to debt incurred by individuals due to health care costs and related expenses, such as an ambulance ride or the cost of visiting a doctor.

Medical debt differs from other forms of debt because it is usually incurred accidentally or faultlessly. People do not plan to fall ill or hurt themselves, and healthcare remedies are often unavoidable; medical debt is often treated with more sympathy than other kinds of debt resulting in advice that people ought not try to convert it to credit card debt.

== United States ==
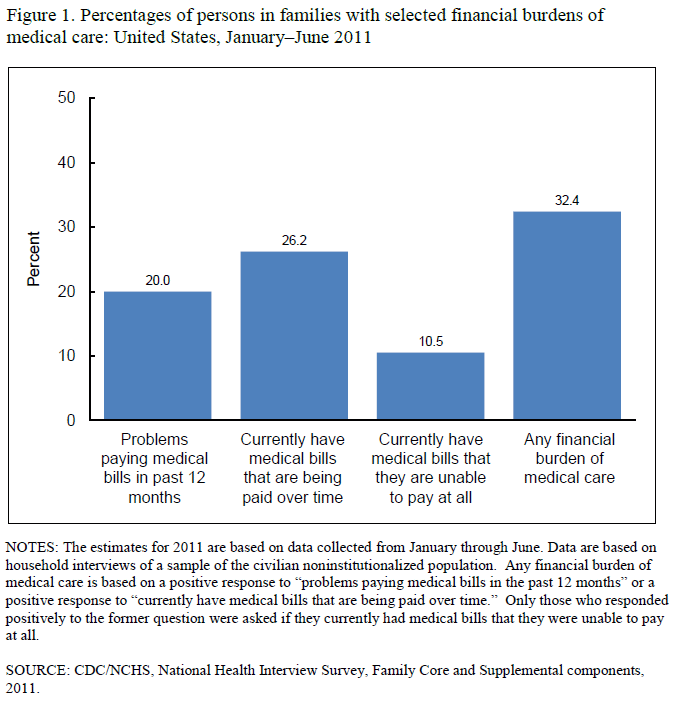
Percentages of persons in families with selected financial burdens of medical care: United States, January–June 2011. From National Health Interview Survey.

Medical debt is an especially notable phenomenon in the United States. According to a 2019 poll from the Pew Research center, American citizens are much more worried about health care issues as a top public matter and concern, especially medical expenses, rather than the economy and terrorism.

In less developed nations those on low income in need of treatment will often avail themselves of whatever help they can from either the state or NGOs without going into debt, and in most developed countries public coverage of healthcare costs are comprehensive. But in the US, even when the patient has insurance coverage, including coverage under the Patient Protection and Affordable Care Act of 2010, considerable medical costs remain the patient's responsibility. Consequently, medical debt has been found by a 2009 study to be the primary cause of personal bankruptcy. One of the surveys that has been conducted by the Kaiser Family Foundation showed that the amount of debt incurred by individuals for health care costs is likely to cause personal bankruptcy. The study, which involved adults with employer-sponsored insurance, found that while 20% of those surveyed have been approached by agencies, almost 9% of people declared their bankruptcy due to the health expenses.

A 2007 survey found about 70 million Americans either have difficulty paying for medical treatment or have medical debt. According to research done in 2019, especially adults who are between 18–64 years and those lacking health insurance coverage are familiar with medical financial hardship in the US. It is estimated that up to 200 billion dollars of medical debt is owed in the United States; the state that owes the lowest amount of medical debt is Hawaii at 2.3%.

Using 2023 National Health Interview Survey data, the Centers for Disease Control and Prevention reported that 21.2 percent of adults with disabilities lived in families that had problems paying or were unable to pay medical bills during the preceding 12 months, compared with 9.6 percent of adults without disabilities; the disparity appeared in every age group.

Studies have found people are most likely to accumulate large medical debts when they do not have health insurance to cover the costs of necessary medications, treatments, or procedures—in 2009 about 50 million Americans had no health coverage. However, about 60% of those found to have medical debt were insured. Health insurance plans rarely cover all health-related expenses; for insured people, the gap between insurance coverage and the affordability of health care manifests as medical debt. As with any type of debt, medical debt can lead to an array of personal and financial problems—including having to go without food and heat plus a reluctance to seek further medical treatment. Aggressive debt collecting has been highlighted as an aggravating factor. A study has found about 63% of adults with medical debt avoided further medical treatment, compared with only 19% of adults who had no such debt.

In the United States, one of the largest concerns of medical debt stems from high medical costs. For example, in a 2011 study of fees paid to physicians for office visits and hip replacement procedures across the United States and several other wealthy countries, the patients in the United States paid 27% more for office visits and 70% more for hip replacement procedures. Similarly, the United States charges an average of $75,345 for a heart bypass operation whereas the same operation in other wealthy countries, such as the Netherlands and Switzerland, costs $15,000 to $36,000 on average. In general, data has shown that individuals in the United States pay nearly double the amount of money on healthcare in their lifetime than those in other wealthy countries. As these healthcare costs continue to rise, a lack of insurance or insurance that does not cover all fees causes a rise in out-of-pocket expenses. In addition, those with medical debts may increase in the future due to increasing patient cost-sharing and rising health care costs.

Medical debt is consuming Americans, in fact, it is the number one cause of bankruptcy, because more than 60% of Americans deplete their savings due to some unexpected healthcare cost. Passage of the Patient Protection and Affordable Care Act (PPACA), sometimes described as Obamacare, is associated with a reduction in medical debt, by helping lower income persons obtain comprehensive health insurance or qualify for Medicaid coverage.

According to a study conducted in 2012 by Demos, it was determined that among indebted households 62% cited out-of-pocket medical expenses as a contribution to their debt. As these medical fees continue to rise and out-of-pocket expenses continue to grow, Americans are at much higher risk of falling into medical debt whether insured or not.

In May 2023, President Biden publicly discouraged all Americans from using medical credit cards to pay for their medical bills due to the credit cards' high interest rates.

== Medical debt in other countries ==
The threat of unmanageable medical debts is less common for those in Western Europe, Japan and Australia. A 2019 study of health provision carried out for the Los Angeles Times reported in the United Kingdom, Sweden, France, Germany and Japan about 2.8% of citizens struggled with high medical bills compared to about 16.6% of Americans. In the same year, a World Health Organization analysis of the spending of patients in 36 countries found that only 1 household in 90 in the Netherlands risked facing prohibitive medical expenses. According to another report by the Los Angeles Times, countries such as the United Kingdom and Canada that have state-funded health provision, and Germany and the Netherlands where private insurers have tight limits on the amount of patients may be charged, few people struggle to afford medical expenses. Research based on available data from 2018 indicated that the amount of unaffordable health care by individuals in the USA (7.4%) was considerably higher than European states such as France where only 1.9% of people faced concerns regarding medical bills, Germany (2.4%), the UK (1.4%), the Netherlands (1.1%), and non-European countries such as Australia (3.2%) and Japan (2.6%). The study found that although health care expenses are cheaper in other countries in comparison with the US, such countries faced difficulties such as overcrowding in UK hospitals and long waiting lists in Canada.

== Medical debt in bankruptcy ==
Medical debt is considered as a non-priority unsecured debt in Chapter 7 bankruptcy. In other words, medical debts are paid only after assets are applied to the debt of creditors who hold priority debt, and thus medical debts are often discharged in their entirety at the conclusion of the bankruptcy process. If the bankrupt estate has sufficient assets such that a part of the medical debt is repaid through bankruptcy, any remaining outstanding medical debt that is included in the bankruptcy case will be discharged.

Share of Debtors Citing Specific Contributors to Their Bankruptcy: United States, 2013–2016.
Reasons Cited as Contributors to Bankruptcy	(A) Very Much Agree, %	(B) Somewhat Agree, %	(A) + (B) Very Much or Somewhat Agree, %
Medical-related reasons
Medical expenses	37.0	21.5	58.5
Medical problems causing work loss	27.9	16.5	44.3
Either of above	44.2	22.3	66.5
Change in family size such as birth or death	13.7	7.9	21.6
Any of above	50.1	21.4	71.5
Other reasons
Income loss (including persons with medically related work loss)	61.5	16.3	77.8
Unaffordable mortgage or foreclosure	29.2	15.8	45.0
Spending/living beyond means	17.2	27.2	44.4
Student loans	14.3	11.1	25.4
Divorce/separation	18.5	5.9	24.4
Tried to help friends/relatives	12.7	15.7	28.4

US bankruptcy filings the last five years.
	Business	Non-business	Total
2022	13,481	374,240	387,721
2021	14,347	399,269	413,616
2020	21,655	522,808	544,463
2019	22,780	752,160	774,940
2018	22,232	751,186	773,418

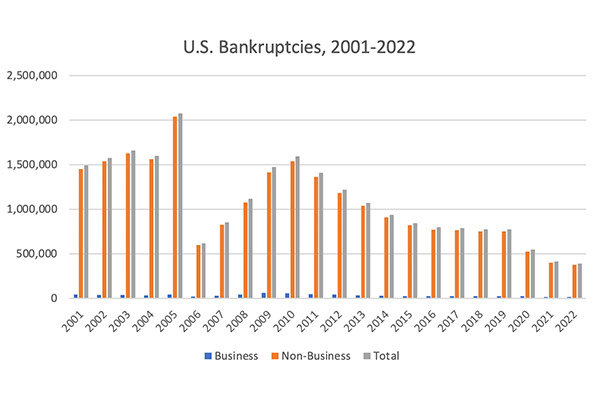
Number of personal and business US bankruptcy filings by year.

== Settlement of medical debt ==
=== Public programs ===
In order to tackle the issue, an advocacy organization, Physicians for a National Health Program thinks of a special program which would enhance insurance coverage for Americans. Under that single-payer health care system, Medicare for All is advocated for the resemblance of the health care services with that work in Canada, where all individuals are free to consult a doctor generally without paying a bill at all. The survey has demonstrated that 56% of citizens supported that national plan in 2019.

=== Financial assistance by organizations ===
The PAN Foundation is considered to be "an independent, national 501 (c)(3) organization dedicated to helping federally and commercially insured people living with life-threatening, chronic and rare diseases with the out-of-pocket costs for their prescribed medications" and the non-profit organization has provided approximately 1 million patients those are underinsured with a financial aid equaling to $3 billion since 2004. Apart from that, the national organization "providing free, professional support services and information to help people manage the emotional, practical and financial challenges of cancer", CancerCare has provided $39.7 million as a financial assistance to reportedly 24,767 people in order to help with treatment-related medical costs.

=== Debt negotiation ===
According to Dr. Marty Makary, the professor of health policy and management at Johns Hopkins Bloomberg School of Public Health and a surgeon at the Johns Hopkins Hospital, debt negotiation is achievable before, during and after the health care services in the process of a high costing of medical expenses.

On the other hand, the issue of inaccuracy is common in the health care sector related to the price of services and in case of any inaccuracy is better to be reviewed before the negotiation process. Dr. Carolyn McClanahan, the founder and director of financial planning at Life Planning Partners, says that patients should double-check whether they received all the services for which they are billed. America's Debt Help Organization encourages patients to check the medical bills for the common mistakes such as double billing, fraudulent charges and coding (typo) errors with the insurance company as the first course of action before going into the debt negotiation process.

=== Debt forgiveness ===
In 2016 John Oliver forgave $14.9 million of medical debt on his Last Week Tonight show. The debt was purchased for just $60,000 through a company named "Central Asset Recovery Professionals" (or CARP, a pun on the bottom feeding fish) which Oliver said had cost just $50 to create. After the purchase he reportedly received a portfolio offering the names, current addresses and Social Security numbers of about 9,000 people which was sent to the RIP Medical Debt organization in order to have the debt forgiven.

In 2018, two local women from the Finger Lakes region in New York partnered with the nonprofit RIP Medical Debt after fundraising for the purpose of debt collection for debt forgiveness. The nonprofit looks for bundled packages of debt from first or third party agencies which the group negotiates to purchase at discounted prices (pennies on the dollar). The two women initially raised $12,500 and used this money to purchase $1.5 million of medical debt through RIP Medical Debt, which was then forgiven.

=== Debt consolidation ===
Debt consolidation may be an option for those who carry medical debt on credit cards, by providing a reduced interest rate.

== See also ==
- Charge description master
- Financial toxicity
- Health care in the United States
- Health care systems by country
- Health economics
- Health insurance
- International comparisons
- Underinsured
