= Financial toxicity =

Financial toxicity describes the negative impact medical expenses can have on patients in terms of their health-related quality of life. It leads to negative mental and physical effects as well as, in some cases, bankruptcy, loss of job or income, or even homelessness.

== Background ==
The term financial toxicity was used in a 2009 article about the cancer drug industry "as a side effect of cancer drug treatment, along with nausea and hair loss".

The cost of medical treatment has become a major complication of treatment in the United States, leading to suffering comparable to physical suffering and damaging a person's ability to recover from their illness, according to a 2013 study published in The Oncologist Journal. Patients can forgo treatments or opt for less-cost treatments, which can have a negative impact on their health.

== Prevalence ==
In a study from Oregon, almost 20% of older adults with advanced cancer experienced financial toxicity. This was assessed using 3 simple questions: "At any time in the past 3 months have you taken less medication than was prescribed for you because of the cost?" (Delayed medications); the second question was, "When you think about the amount of income that you have available in a typical month, is there enough for your food and housing costs?" (income available) and the third question was, "When you think about the amount of income that you have available in a typical month, is it enough for things you really need like clothing, medicine, repairs to the home or transportation" (enough income).

== Risk factors ==
As of 2020, preexisting debt, prediagnosis conditions, type of employment like hourly versus salaried, and asset levels are "areas in need of further study" according to the National Cancer Institute. Certain types of cancer treatments requiring daily attendance to a clinic or healthcare provider can increase the risk of financial toxicity on patients.

== Interventions ==
Since 2009, the American Society of Clinical Oncology has recommended ~ guidance on how healthcare professionals talk to patients about costs. Providing financial information and counseling patients with "financial navigators" have been suggested. However, cancer treatment cost information is transparent.

Increasing insurance accessibility and putting trauma-informed treatment practices in place, with the result that health insurance helps lessen financial toxicity.

== See also ==
- Medical debt
