= Consumer leverage ratio =

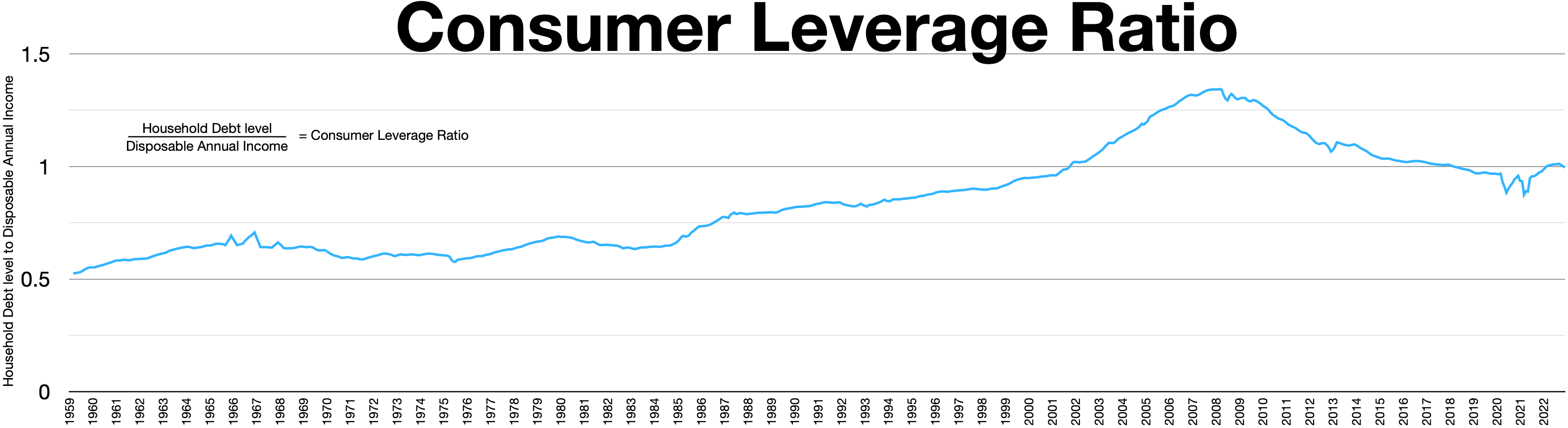
Consumer Leverage Ratio in the US

The consumer leverage ratio (CLR) is the ratio of total household debt to disposable personal income. The Federal Reserve separately reports household debt service payments as a percentage of disposable personal income. The Bureau of Economic Analysis publishes disposable personal income data.

$\mbox{Consumer leverage ratio} = {\mbox{Total household debt} \over \mbox{Disposable personal income}}$

The concept has been used to quantify the amount of debt an average consumer has, relative to their disposable income. In essence, the consumer leverage ratio demonstrates how many years it would take an average consumer to pay off their debt if their entire annual disposable income went toward it.

== Overview ==
The concept, popularized by William Jarvis and Dr. Ian C MacMillan in a series of articles in the Harvard Business Review, is being used in economic analysis and reporting, having been compared to other relevant economic indicators since the 1970s.

The consumer leverage ratio in the US was increasing in the years before the 2008 financial crisis, peaking at 1.29x in 2007 and decreasing ever since. As of the fourth quarter of 2016, the ratio in the US stood at 1.04x. The historical average of this ratio since late 1975 is approximately 0.9x.

Many economists argue the rapid growth in consumer leverage has been the primary fuel of corporate earnings growth in the past few decades and thus represents significant economic risk and reward to the US economy. Jarvis and MacMillan quantify this risk within specific businesses and industries in a ratio form as "Consumer Leverage Exposure" (CLE).

== See also ==
- Debt-to-income ratio — the percentage of a consumer's monthly gross income that goes toward paying debts.
- Debt ratio — the percentage of company assets that are provided via debt.
- Debt-to-GDP ratio — the ratio between government debt and the national GDP.
- Consumer economics
- Economic indicators
