= Consumer debt =

Amount owed by individual consumers

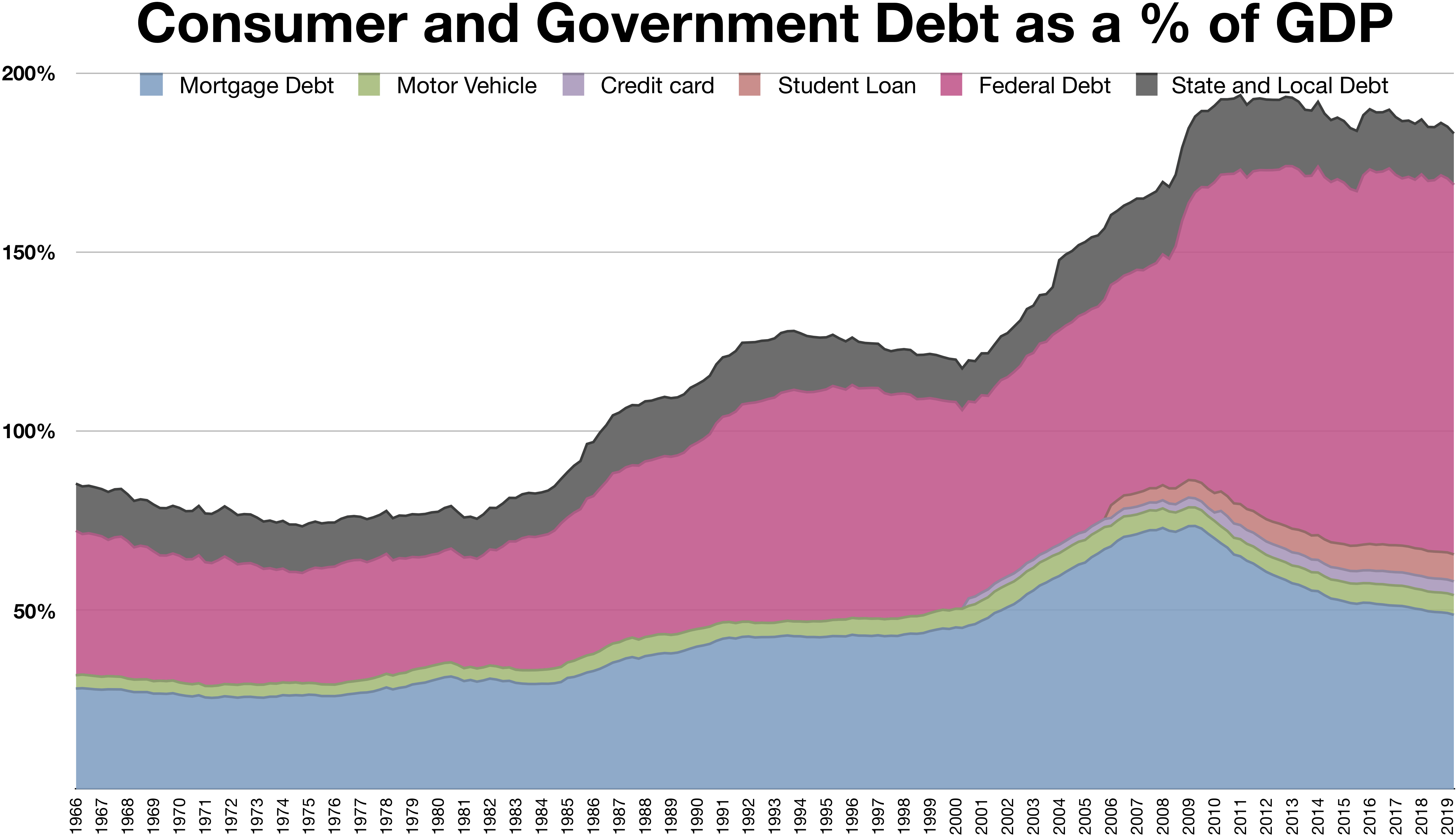
Consumer and Government Debt as a % of GDP (United States)

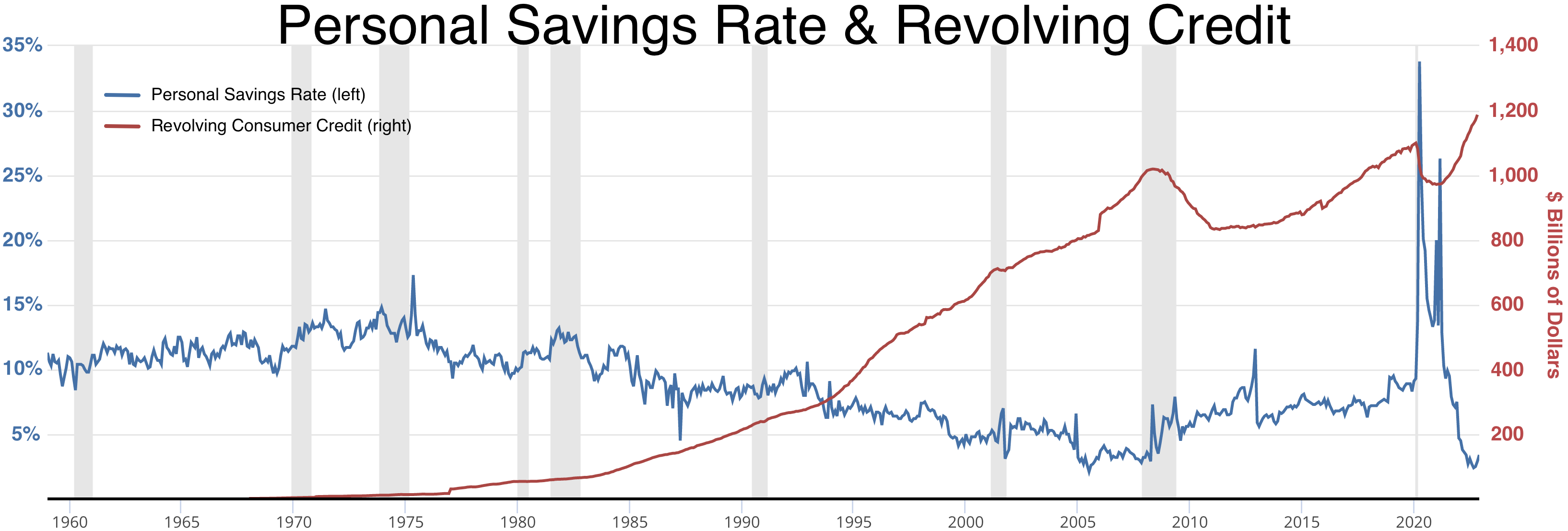
Personal savings & consumer credit in the US Personal savings rate (left) Revolving credit (right)

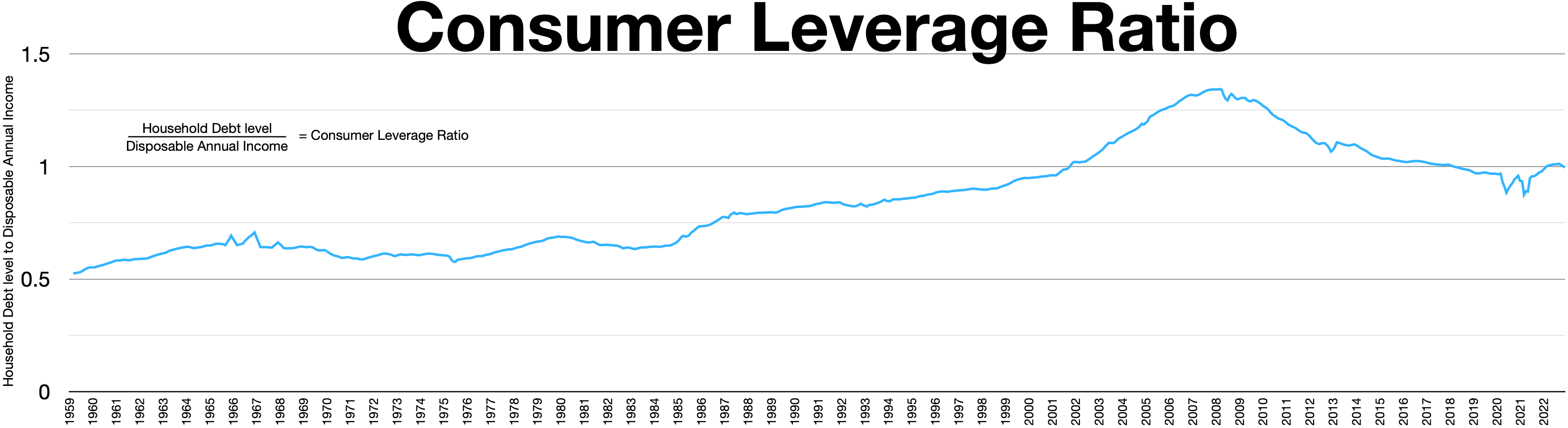
Consumer leverage ratio

In economics, consumer debt is the amount owed by consumers (as opposed to amounts owed by businesses or governments). It includes debts incurred on purchase of goods that are consumable and/or do not appreciate. In macroeconomic terms, it is debt which is used to fund consumption rather than investment.

The most common forms of consumer debt are credit card debt, payday loans, student loans and other consumer finance, which are often at higher interest rates than long-term secured loans, such as mortgages.

Long-term consumer debt is often considered fiscally suboptimal. While some consumer items such as automobiles may be marketed as having high levels of utility that justify incurring short-term debt, most consumer goods are not. For example, incurring high-interest consumer debt through buying a big-screen television "now", rather than saving for it, cannot usually be financially justified by the subjective benefits of having the television early.

In many countries, the ease with which individuals can accumulate consumer debt beyond their means to repay has led to a growth in the debt consolidation industry and credit counseling. Debt also leads to a lower credit score and may have effects on mental health.

The amount of debt outstanding versus the consumer's disposable income is expressed as the consumer leverage ratio. On a monthly basis, this debt ratio is advised to be no more than 20 percent of an individual's take-home pay. The interest rate charged depends on a range of factors, including the economic climate, perceived ability of the customer to repay, competitive pressures from other lenders, and the inherent structure and security of the credit product. Rates generally range from 0.25 percent above base rate, to well into double figures. Consumer debt is also associated with predatory lending, although there is much debate as to what exactly constitutes predatory lending.

In recent years, an alternative analysis might view consumer debt as a way to increase domestic production, on the grounds that if credit is easily available, the increased demand for consumer goods should cause an increase in overall domestic production. The permanent income hypothesis suggests that consumers take debt to smooth consumption throughout their lives, borrowing to finance expenditures (particularly housing and schooling) earlier in their lives and paying down debt during higher-earning periods.

Personal debt is on the rise, particularly in the United States and the United Kingdom. According to the US Federal Reserve's 2024 statistics, the US household debt service ratio was at its lowest level since its peak in the Fall of 2007 in 2021, but has since risen.

== Debt-to-GDP ratio, consumer leverage ratio ==
A country's private debt can be measured as a 'debt-to-GDP ratio', which is the total outstanding private debt of its residents divided by that nation's annual GDP. A variant is the consumer leverage ratio, which is the ratio of debt to personal income.

== List of countries ==
List of countries by consumer debt as % of GDP
Country/Region	1960	2016	2025
Afghanistan	–	3.6	–
Albania	–	34.5	–
Algeria	–	23.5	–
American Samoa (US)	–	–	–
Andorra	–	–	–
Angola	–	21.0	–
Antigua and Barbuda	–	48.3	–
Argentina	–	14.0	5.70
Armenia	–	48.9	–
Aruba (Netherlands)	–	–	–
Australia	–	142.9	114.00
Austria	–	85.6	41.60
Azerbaijan	–	26.6	–
Bahamas, The	–	68.2	–
Bahrain	–	–	–
Bangladesh	–	44.4	–
Barbados	–	–	–
Belarus	–	25.9	–
Belgium	–	64.7	56.80
Belize	–	56.8	–
Benin	–	21.8	–
Bermuda (UK)	–	–	–
Bhutan	–	46.5	–
Bolivia	–	64.2	–
Bosnia and Herzegovina	–	54.3	–
Botswana	–	32.3	–
Brazil	–	62.2	37.60
British Virgin Islands (UK)	–	–	–
Brunei	–	44.3	–
Bulgaria	–	53.6	–
Burkina Faso	–	26.6	–
Burundi	–	16.7	–
Cambodia	–	69.7	–
Cameroon	–	20.8	–
Canada	–	–	100.60
Cape Verde	–	63.0	–
Cayman Islands (UK)	–	–	–
Central African Republic	11.2	12.8	–
Chad	3.5	10.2	–
Channel Islands (UK)	–	–	–
Chile	22.1	112.1	43.80
China	–	156.7	–
Colombia	22.9	47.1	–
Comoros	–	26.5	–
Congo, Dem. Rep.	–	7.8	–
Congo, Rep.	22.2	25.0	–
Costa Rica	27.0	59.3	–
Croatia	–	61.6	–
Cuba	–	–	–
Curaçao (Netherlands)	–	–	–
Cyprus	–	230.1	–
Czech Republic	–	51.8	–
Denmark	44.5	–	–
Djibouti	–	–	–
Dominica	–	51.5	–
Dominican Republic	5.8	28.4	–
Ecuador	25.6	29.4	–
Egypt	–	34.1	–
El Salvador	–	45.6	–
Equatorial Guinea	–	19.1	–
Eritrea	–	–	–
Estonia	–	72.6	–
Eswatini	–	21.6	–
Ethiopia	–	–	–
Faroe Islands (Denmark)	–	–	–
Fiji	–	89.9	–
Finland	36.8	95.5	62.90
France	20.0	97.6	59.70
French Polynesia (France)	–	–	–
Gabon	8.2	13.6	–
Gambia, The	–	–	–
Georgia	–	62.0	–
Germany	–	77.5	–
Ghana	4.6	19.6	–
Gibraltar	–	–	–
Greece	12.2	107.7	–
Greenland (Denmark)	–	–	–
Grenada	–	56.1	–
Guam (US)	–	–	–
Guatemala	10.1	34.3	–
Guinea	–	12.9	–
Guinea-Bissau	–	7.1	–
Guyana	11.2	45.5	–
Haiti	–	18.3	–
Honduras	9.9	56.3	–
Hong Kong	–	203.8	–
Hungary	–	34.9	–
Iceland	46.9	87.3	–
India	7.9	49.8	47.80
Indonesia	–	39.4	–
Iran	12.9	–	–
Iraq	8.5	–	–
Ireland	30.1	49.2	–
Isle of Man (UK)	–	–	–
Israel	13.5	65.4	–
Italy	–	86.1	–
Ivory Coast	–	22.7	–
Jamaica	15.7	32.1	–
Japan	56.3	185.0	–
Jordan	–	75.1	–
Kazakhstan	–	34.3	–
Kenya	–	32.9	–
Kiribati	–	–	–
Kosovo	–	39.3	–
Kuwait	–	–	–
Kyrgyzstan	–	21.2	–
Laos	–	–	–
Latvia	–	67.4	–
Lebanon	–	111.9	–
Lesotho	–	17.5	–
Liberia	–	–	–
Libya	–	–	–
Liechtenstein	–	–	–
Lithuania	–	43.0	–
Luxembourg	–	100.1	–
Macau	–	118.1	–
Madagascar	–	13.2	–
Malawi	–	10.5	–
Malaysia	8.9	124.0	69.80
Maldives	–	37.3	–
Mali	–	25.4	–
Malta	–	87.1	–
Marshall Islands	–	–	–
Mauritania	–	–	–
Mauritius	–	96.4	–
Mexico	20.6	35.0	17.40
Micronesia, Fed. Sts.	–	23.4	–
Moldova	–	30.6	–
Monaco	–	–	–
Mongolia	–	58.7	–
Montenegro	–	51.2	–
Morocco	12.0	65.4	–
Mozambique	–	34.5	–
Myanmar	6.2	20.7	–
Namibia	–	56.7	–
Nauru	–	–	–
Nepal	1.0	81.0	–
Netherlands	18.4	111.2	93.80
New Caledonia (France)	–	–	–
New Zealand	15.5	–	–
Nicaragua	15.4	38.7	–
Niger	–	13.7	–
Nigeria	3.7	15.7	–
North Korea	–	–	–
North Macedonia	–	47.4	–
Northern Mariana Islands (US)	–	–	–
Norway	32.7	145.0	–
Oman	–	75.6	–
Pakistan	11.1	16.2	–
Palau	–	–	–
Palestine	–	42.0	–
Panama	17.8	91.0	–
Papua New Guinea	–	–	–
Paraguay	9.1	54.4	–
Peru	12.5	36.2	–
Philippines	12.0	44.7	–
Poland	–	54.8	–
Portugal	39.5	112.2	53.90
Puerto Rico (US)	–	–	–
Qatar	–	79.4	–
Romania	–	28.2	–
Russia	–	–	21.40
Rwanda	–	21.2	–
Saint Kitts and Nevis	–	56.5	–
Saint Lucia	–	86.8	–
Collectivity of Saint Martin (France)	–	–	–
Saint Vincent and the Grenadines	–	50.8	–
Samoa	–	80.1	–
San Marino	–	–	–
São Tomé and Príncipe	–	26.4	–
Saudi Arabia	–	58.0	–
Senegal	14.8	33.1	–
Serbia	–	44.1	–
Seychelles	–	26.9	–
Sierra Leone	2.8	5.6	–
Singapore	–	132.9	–
Sint Maarten (Netherlands)	–	–	–
Slovakia	–	57.1	–
Slovenia	–	47.4	–
Solomon Islands	–	39.0	–
Somalia	–	–	–
South Africa	–	144.7	–
South Korea	5.7	143.3	88.60
South Sudan	–	–	–
Spain	31.4	111.8	–
Sri Lanka	7.3	46.0	–
Sudan	8.9	8.9	–
Suriname	–	33.3	–
Sweden	38.2	129.6	–
Switzerland	96.0	177.7	–
Syria	25.3	–	–
Taiwan	–	–	–
Tajikistan	–	19.2	–
Tanzania	–	14.3	–
Thailand	10.1	147.4	–
Timor-Leste	–	–	–
Togo	–	39.3	–
Tonga	–	38.1	–
Trinidad and Tobago	8.5	41.3	–
Tunisia	–	81.2	–
Turkey	17.7	70.3	–
Turkmenistan	–	–	–
Turks and Caicos Islands (UK)	–	–	–
Tuvalu	–	–	–
Uganda	6.5	13.7	–
Ukraine	–	47.3	–
United Arab Emirates	–	85.9	–
United Kingdom	17.6	135.9	–
United States	70.9	192.7	–
Uruguay	31.0	28.2	–
Uzbekistan	–	–	–
Vanuatu	–	68.5	–
Venezuela	14.0	–	–
Vietnam	–	123.8	–
US Virgin Islands (US)	–	–	–
Yemen	–	–	–
Zambia	–	13.0	–
Zimbabwe	–	–	–

== See also ==
- Consumerism
- Consumer credit risk
- Household debt
