= Debt consolidation =

Form of debt refinancing

Debt consolidation is a form of debt refinancing that entails taking out one loan to pay off many others. This commonly refers to a personal finance process of individuals addressing high consumer debt, but occasionally it can also refer to a country's fiscal approach to consolidate corporate debt or government debt. The process can secure a lower overall interest rate to the entire debt load and provide the convenience of servicing only one loan or debt. Debt consolidation is sometimes offered by loan sharks, charging clients exorbitant interest rates. Further regulation has been discussed as a result.

== Overview ==
Debt generally refers to money owed by one party, the debtor, to a second party, the creditor. It is generally subject to repayments of principal and interest. Interest is the fee charged by the creditor to the debtor, generally calculated as a percentage of the principal sum per year known as an interest rate and generally paid periodically at intervals, such as monthly. Debt can be secured with collateral or unsecured.

Although there is variation from country to country and even in regions within country, consumer debt is primarily made up of home loans, credit card debt and car loans. Household debt is the consumer debt of the adults in the household plus the mortgage, if applicable. In many countries, especially the United States and the United Kingdom, student loans can be a significant portion of debt but are usually regulated differently than other debt. The overall debt can reach the point where a debtor is in danger of bankruptcy, insolvency, or other fiscal emergency. Options available to overburdened debtors include credit counseling and personal bankruptcy.

Other consumer options include:

- debt settlement, where an individual's debt is negotiated to a lesser interest rate or principal with the creditors to lessen the overall burden;
- debt relief, where part or whole of an individual debt is forgiven; and
- debt consolidation, where the individual is able to acquit the current debts by taking out a new loan.

Sometimes the solution includes some of each of these tactics.

=== Process ===
The bulk of the consumer debt, especially that with a high interest, is repaid by a new loan. Most debt consolidation loans are offered from lending institutions and secured as a second mortgage or home equity line of credit. These require the individual to put up a home as collateral and the loan to be less than the equity available.

The overall lower interest rate is an advantage that debt consolidation loan offers to consumers. Lenders have fixed costs to process payments and repayment can spread out over a larger period. However, such consolidation loans have costs: fees, interest, and "points" where one point equals to one percent of the amount borrowed. In some countries, these loans may provide certain tax advantages. Because they are secured, a lender can attempt to seize property if the borrower goes into default.

Personal loans comprise another form of debt consolidation loan. Individuals can issue debtors a personal loan that satisfies the outstanding debt and creates a new one on their own terms. These loans, often unsecured, are based on the personal relationship rather than collateral.

In United States, there are certain companies and private law firms addressed as debt relief companies and/or debt consolidation companies that provide professional debt consolidation services. A consumer can approach them for debt help and make only one monthly payment to them. This payment will then be disbursed by these companies among the various creditors the consumer is indebted to. Many other countries, alongside the United States, also have such professional services for the benefit of consumers struggling with household debt.

== Student loan consolidation ==
In the United States, student loans which are part of the Federal Direct Student Loan Program are consolidated somewhat differently from in the UK, as federal student loans are guaranteed by the U.S. government.

=== Australia ===
Australia's student loan system once allowed 35 years to pay back loans, but currently allows 15. Those seriously delinquent on student loans face arrest at the border.

=== Japan ===
In Japan, an increasing number of student loans are in arrears. In response, the nation is taking harsher steps when it comes to lending determinations. In an effort to prevent future defaults, Japan has begun associating loan approvals to academic performance.

=== United Kingdom ===
In the UK student loan entitlements are guaranteed, and are recovered using a means-tested system from the student's future income. Student loans in the UK can not be included in bankruptcy, but do not affect a person's credit rating because the repayments are deducted from salary at source by employers, similar to income tax and National Insurance contributions. Many students, however, struggle with commercial debt well after their courses have finished.

=== United States ===
In a federal student loan consolidation, a weighted average interest rate is assigned to the consolidation loan, rounded up to the nearest eighth. Federal student loan consolidation is sometimes incorrectly referred to as refinancing. Unlike some private sector debt consolidation, student loan consolidation does not incur any fees for the borrower.

== See also ==
- List of accounting topics
- Debt management plan
