= Debt settlement =

Settlement negotiated with a debtor's unsecured creditor

Debt settlement (also called debt reduction, debt negotiation or debt resolution) is a settlement negotiated with a debtor's unsecured creditor. Commonly, creditors agree to forgive a large part of the debt: perhaps around half, though results can vary widely. When settlements are finalized, the terms are put in writing. It is common that the debtor makes one lump-sum payment in exchange for the creditor agreeing that the debt is now cancelled and the matter closed. Some settlements are paid out over a number of months. In either case, as long as the debtor does what is agreed in the negotiation, no outstanding debt will appear on the former debtor's credit report.

== History ==
As a concept, lenders have been practicing debt settlement for thousands of years. However, the business of debt settlement became prominent in the USA during the late 1980s and early 1990s, when bank deregulation, which loosened consumer lending practices, followed by an economic recession, placed consumers in financial hardship.

With charge-offs (debts written-off by banks) increasing, banks established debt settlement departments whose staff were authorized to negotiate with defaulted cardholders to reduce the outstanding balances in the hope of recover funds that would otherwise be lost if the cardholder filed for Chapter 7 bankruptcy. Typical settlements ranged between 25% and 65% of the outstanding balance.

== Process ==
Debt settlement is the process of negotiating with creditors to reduce and extinguish overall debts in exchange for a lump sum payment. A successful settlement occurs when the creditor agrees to forgive a percentage of the total account balance. Normally, only unsecured debts, not secured by real assets like homes or autos, can be settled. Unsecured debts include medical bills and credit card debt; but not public student loans, auto financing or mortgages. If the alternative is not to be able to recover the security in a timely or economical manner, the creditor may choose to settle. This is an economic transaction and sub justice to the creditor's interests. For the debtor, the settlement makes obvious sense: they avoid the stigma and intrusive court-mandated controls of bankruptcy while still lowering their debt balances, sometimes by more than 50%. For the creditor, they regain trust that the borrower intends to pay back what he can of the loans and not file for bankruptcy (in which case, the creditor risks losing all moneys owed).

Negotiating with a collection agency or junk debt buyer is somewhat similar to negotiating with a credit card company or other original creditor. However, many collection agencies (or junk debt buyers) will agree to take less of the owed amount than the original creditor, because the junk debt buyer has purchased the debt for a fraction of the original balance. As a part of the settlement, the consumer can request that collection is removed from the credit report, which is generally not the case with the original creditor. Even if the collection account has been removed from the consumer credit report as a condition of settlement, as agreed during negotiations, the negative marks from the original credit card company will still remain, according to Maxine Sweet, a spokeswoman for credit reporting agency Experian.

=== United Kingdom ===
In the UK one can appoint an arbiter or legal entity to negotiate with the creditors. Creditors often accept reduced balances in a final payment; this is called "full and final settlement". However, with debt settlement the reduced amount can be spread over an agreed term.

In the UK creditors such as banks, credit card and loan companies and other creditors are already writing off huge amounts of debt. Most creditors are open to negotiations and are willing to accept reductions of 50% or more. Debt settlement allows the debtor to spread payments out over a set term, instead of having to pay a lump sum in one go which is the case with full and final settlement.

UK debt settlement is not to be confused with full and final settlement, where debt management companies have been known to hold on to client funds; in which case the creditors get nothing until they decide to settle. Furthermore, the debt management company usually instructs the consumer not to make any payments to creditors. The intended effect is to scare creditors into settling the debt for less than the full amount. Typically, however, creditors simply begin collection procedures, which can include filing suit against the consumer in court. As long as consumers continue to make minimum monthly payments, creditors will not negotiate a reduced balance. However, when payments stop, balances continue to grow because of late fees and ongoing interest.

=== United States ===
Enrollment in a debt settlement program typically begins with the company reviewing a consumer's debts and proposing a savings plan. The consumer then stops making payments to creditors and instead deposits funds into a dedicated account, which under Federal Trade Commission rules must be held at an FDIC-insured bank or NCUA-insured credit union and must be owned and controlled by the consumer. As funds accumulate — typically over a period of two to four years — the company negotiates settlement offers with individual creditors. If the consumer approves an offer, the creditor is paid directly from the dedicated account. If the offer is declined, the debt relief company restarts negotiations. Under the FTC's Telemarketing Sales Rule, a debt relief company can only collect its fee after a payment is successfully made toward a settlement, and the consumer has complete control of their money and can decide to drop out without repercussions.

U.S. debt settlement differs slightly. There are several indicators that few consumers actually have their debt eliminated by full and final settlement. A survey of US debt settlement companies conducted by Harvard Kennedy School economist Will Dobbie, found that 34.4% of enrollees had 75 percent or more of their debt settled within three years. Data released by the Colorado Attorney General showed that only 11.35 percent of consumers who had enrolled more than three years earlier had all of their debt settled. And when asked to show that most of their customers are better off after debt settlement, industry leaders said that would be an "unrealistic measure."

Consumers can arrange their own settlements by using advice found on websites, hire a lawyer to act for them, or use debt settlement companies. In a New York Times article, Cyndi Geerdes, an associate professor at the University of Illinois law school, states "Done correctly, [debt settlement] can absolutely help people". However, stopping payments to creditors as part of a debt settlement plan can reduce a consumer's credit score by 65 to 125 points, with higher impacts on those who were current on their payments prior to enrolling in the program. And missed payments can remain on a consumer's credit report for seven years even after a debt is settled.

Legitimate settlement companies do not charge any upfront fees; this would be a Federal Trade Commission (FTC) rule violation.

They may also take a monthly fee from customer bank accounts for their service, possibly reducing the incentive to settle with creditors quickly. One expert advises consumers to look for companies that charge only after a settlement is made, and charge about 25 percent of the outstanding balance at the time it's reduced. Other experts say debt settlement is a flawed model altogether and should be avoided.

== Professional debt settlement ==
Depending on the country, different laws regulate professional debt settlement companies. In the United States, debt relief companies are required to provide information in advance of a consumer signing up for the services, including the cost and the terms. A legitimate company will use a Federal Deposit Insurance Corporation-insured trust account. Once enough funds are built up the negotiation process can begin with each creditor individually. Trust accounts, also known as "special purpose accounts", are often held by a bank, and managed by a bank agent (who charges a monthly maintenance fee). Accounts can also be held by creditors, or may be sold to a collections agency for an average of $0.15 on the dollar, in which case debt can still be negotiated.

A consumer makes monthly payments to the debt settlement company, or to the bank (or bank agent) who holds the "trust" account. A portion of each payment is taken as fees for the debt settlement company, and the rest is put into the trust account. The consumer is told not to pay anything to the creditors. The debt settlement company's fees are usually specified in the enrollment contract, and may range from 10% to 75% of the total amount of debt to be settled. FTC regulations effective October 27, 2010, restrict debt settlement companies from collecting any fees from a debtor client for services until settlement with the creditor has been reached and at least one payment made. It must be said that these processes, in the U.S.A. are to be evaluated on a case by case and State by State basis as some states allow for third party debt negotiations if the debtor is not a private citizen.

=== Advantages ===
Settlement companies generally package their settlements into a larger bulk settlement with the creditor for 15–60% of the existing balances. The debt settlement companies typically have built up a relationship during their normal business practices with the credit card companies and can come to a settlement agreement quicker and at a more favorable rate than a debtor acting on their own. During the 2008 financial crisis, more credit card companies were willing to settle existing credit card debts rather than add to their already large written off bad debt. Legal action can be taken against the creditor if they violate the FDCP act. A good settlement company works with their clients to protect them. Debtors can be sued by creditors seeking to recover debts and interest. This can be avoided by using companies with good standings and practices that protect consumers from these procedures. A good debt settlement company will handle calls from the credit card companies, and from collection agencies. Calls will slow down as the settlement company makes contact with the creditors. Good settlement companies will arrange monthly update calls, establish a plan where the debtor can miss a payment or two, or finish the plan six months earlier if consistent with all monthly payments. The main advantage is to delegate a third party, who is not emotionally involved, to negotiate on the debtors behalf.

Debt settlement enables consumers to resolve outstanding accounts for less than the full balance owed, since creditors may agree to accept a reduced lump-sum or structured payment in place of the original debt. Consumer-finance publications reporting on 2022 industry data found that, after accounting for settlement-company fees, consumers who successfully settled enrolled debts generally paid less than the amounts originally owed. Although not every enrolled account was ultimately settled, some consumers chose to leave their programs after resolving enough debt to regain financial stability.

Most debts that reach settlement have already been charged off by the creditor or fallen into severe delinquency, typically after twelve months or more without payment. Because debt settlement can impact a person's credit standing and does not guarantee that all debt will be resolved, it is generally considered a better fit for some financial situations than others.

=== Disadvantages ===
Debt settlement companies generally take a percentage of the savings of the forgiven debt as the fee for their services. Some people choose these services because they prefer to have a professional way to manage the negotiation process. Having a specific strategy in that place can make the process of paying off debt feel more organized and may lead to a faster resolution than managing it alone.

Plans of 36 months or less have a higher completion rate than terms that are greater than 36 months.

Credit card accounts may go into collection after they are charged off, typically 180 days after the last payment on the account but it's not that common because collection agents only pay 1 to 12 cents to the dollar to creditors for the debt. Most creditors would rather settle for 30 to 60 cents to the dollar with the debtor directly.

== Creditor's incentives ==
The creditor's primary incentive is to recover funds that would otherwise be lost if the debtor filed for bankruptcy. The other key incentive is that the creditor can often recover more funds than through other collection methods. Collection agencies and collection attorneys charge commissions as high as 40% on recovered funds. Bad debt purchasers buy portfolios of delinquent debts from creditors who give up on internal collection efforts and these bad debt purchasers pay between 1 and 12 cents on the dollar, depending on the age of the debt, with the oldest debts being the cheapest. Collection calls and lawsuits sometimes push debtors into bankruptcy, in which case the creditor often recovers no funds.

== Common objections ==
Damages credit — Credit reports will show evidence of debt settlements and the associated FICO scores will be lowered temporarily as a result. However, if a "paid in full" letter is obtained from the creditor, the debtor's credit report should show no sign of a debt settlement. Additionally, as debtors settle their accounts the score starts to go back up again. Some Debt Settlement companies offer Credit Repair in their programs in order to erase some of the negative remarks on credit reports.

Potential for lawsuits — Though few creditors wish to push borrowers toward bankruptcy (and perhaps government protection against all debts), there is always the possibility of a lawsuit whenever debts go unpaid. In the debt settlement process the debtor's accounts remain in default until a settlement is agreed. While the debts are in default the creditor or its assignee reserve the right to file a lawsuit against a debtor, but it is highly unlikely that they will. Generally speaking, most creditors do not want to incur legal costs to collect money on a debt that they know they are going to collect anyway through the negotiating process, especially if the debtor is working with a credible debt negotiating company. A good debt negotiating company will provide some sort of legal expenses insurance to protect their clients in the unlikely event of legal action by a creditor.

Eligibility of debts — In addition, the specific debts of the borrowers themselves affect the success of negotiations. Tax liens and domestic judgments remain unaffected by attempts at settlement. Recent law has granted special powers to student loans creditors, even those not federally subsidized, to attach bank accounts without possibility of Chapter 7 bankruptcy protection. Also, some individual creditors, including Discover Card, for example, tend to resist negotiations aggressively.

Tax consequences — Another common objection to debt settlement is that debtors whose debts are partially canceled outside the bankruptcy system will need to report the canceled portion of the debt as taxable income. (IRS Publication Form 982) The Internal Revenue Service (IRS) considers any amount of forgiven debt as taxable income. Under the Foreclosures and Repossessions section, the IRS mentions that the forgiving creditor must provide the taxpayer with a 1099-C tax form for "forgiven debt amounts" of $600 or greater. The 1099-C form will list the amount of forgiven debt and interest in Box 2. Taxpayers with portions of personal loans forgiven may not subtract the interest reported in Box 3 from the amount of reported income on this form.

However, the IRS does not require taxpayers to report forgiven debt if the tax payer was insolvent at the time the creditor forgave the debt. Being insolvent means that the amount of a debtor's debts are greater than his/her assets (how much money and property the debtor owns). However, the IRS adds that "you cannot exclude any amount of canceled debt that is more than the amount by which you are insolvent."

For example, if a taxpayer is $10,000 in debt and owns $3,000 in assets, he/she cannot exclude more than $7,000 of forgiven debt from his/her income tax. Any forgiven debt over $7,000 that year must be reported as taxable income.

== Regulations ==
The FTC's 2010 update to the Telemarketing Sales Rule (TSR) imposes several requirements on debt relief providers. Fees may not be collected until a debt has been renegotiated, settled, or otherwise resolved, the customer has agreed to the result, and the customer has made at least one payment toward it. Providers that require customers to set aside funds in a dedicated account must ensure the account is held at an insured financial institution, that the customer owns and controls the funds, and that the customer may withdraw from the service at any time without penalty. The rule also requires providers to disclose specific risks before a customer enrolls — including potential damage to the customer's credit score and the possibility that creditors may sue or continue collection efforts — and prohibits providers from making false or unsubstantiated claims about their results.

Regulation of debt settlement also varies by state, with some states imposing registration, licensing, or bonding requirements beyond the federal rule. California has required debt settlement providers serving state residents to register with its Department of Financial Protection and Innovation, and Tennessee's Debt Resolution Services Act added state licensing and bonding requirements.

== Criticism ==
In May 2009, the New York Attorney General issued subpoenas to fourteen "debt settlement" companies, looking for violations of New York law. On May 19, 2009, the New York Attorney General filed suit against two "debt settlement" firms and their affiliates, alleging violations related to fraudulent business practices and false advertising.

A March 2010 CBS Early Show story on the debt settlement industry cast a harsh light on major debt settlement firm Credit Solutions of America's business practices, and provided consumer advice for debt settlement counseling.

== See also ==
- Debt
- Debt consolidation
- Debt restructuring
- Bankruptcy
- Credit counseling
- Sponsored repayment
- List of finance topics
- Uniform Debt-Management Services Act
