= Debt management plan =

Debt management plan (DMP) is an agreement between a debtor and a creditor that addresses the terms of an outstanding debt. This commonly refers to a personal finance process of individuals addressing high consumer debt. Debt management plans help reduce outstanding, unsecured debts over time to help the debtor regain control of finances. The process can secure a lower overall interest rate, longer repayment terms, or an overall reduction in the debt itself.

== Overview ==
DMPs for consumers are often negotiated by a credit counseling agency on behalf of the debtor. Credit counseling agencies often address the debt by working with the debtor to set a budget based on their regular income and expenditures that will then include one regular bill payment that is allocated across the creditor(s). Agencies will negotiate on behalf of the debtor to lower payments and interest rates with creditors. Some of the agencies are non-profits that charge no or non-fee rates, while others can be for-profit and include high fees. The effect on the debtor's overall credit score will vary. In the United Kingdom, as well as DMPs, residents can also apply for an Individual voluntary arrangement (IVAs), which can give the debtor a discount on their debt.

== Regulations ==
=== European Union ===
In the European Union, regulation and non-regulation of credit counseling agencies and their approaches, including DMPs, are widely varied. In Sweden, guidelines for credit counseling are loosely provided by the Swedish Confederation of Professional Employees (TCO) and creditors are encouraged to use them in lieu of the court system. In Ireland, the Irish Congress of Trade Unions (ICTU) provides debt resolution information directly to debtors. In Latvia, a debt advisory company called LAKRA works with employers to assist indebted employees.

=== United Kingdom ===
In the United Kingdom, the Financial Conduct Authority is responsible for the regulation of consumer credit and has established a Debt Management Plan Protocol. It can impose fines for improper conduct.

=== United States ===
In the United States, credit counseling agencies are loosely regulated by the Federal Trade Commission (FTC), the nation's consumer protection agency, which can sue companies that have deceived consumers about the cost, nature, or benefits of their services. Different states may regulate DMPs individually and attorneys general are empowered to protect state citizens from fraud.

== See also ==
- Debt consolidation
- Debt counseling
- Debtors Anonymous
- Debt-snowball method
- Bankruptcy
