= Credit card debt =

Form of consumer debt

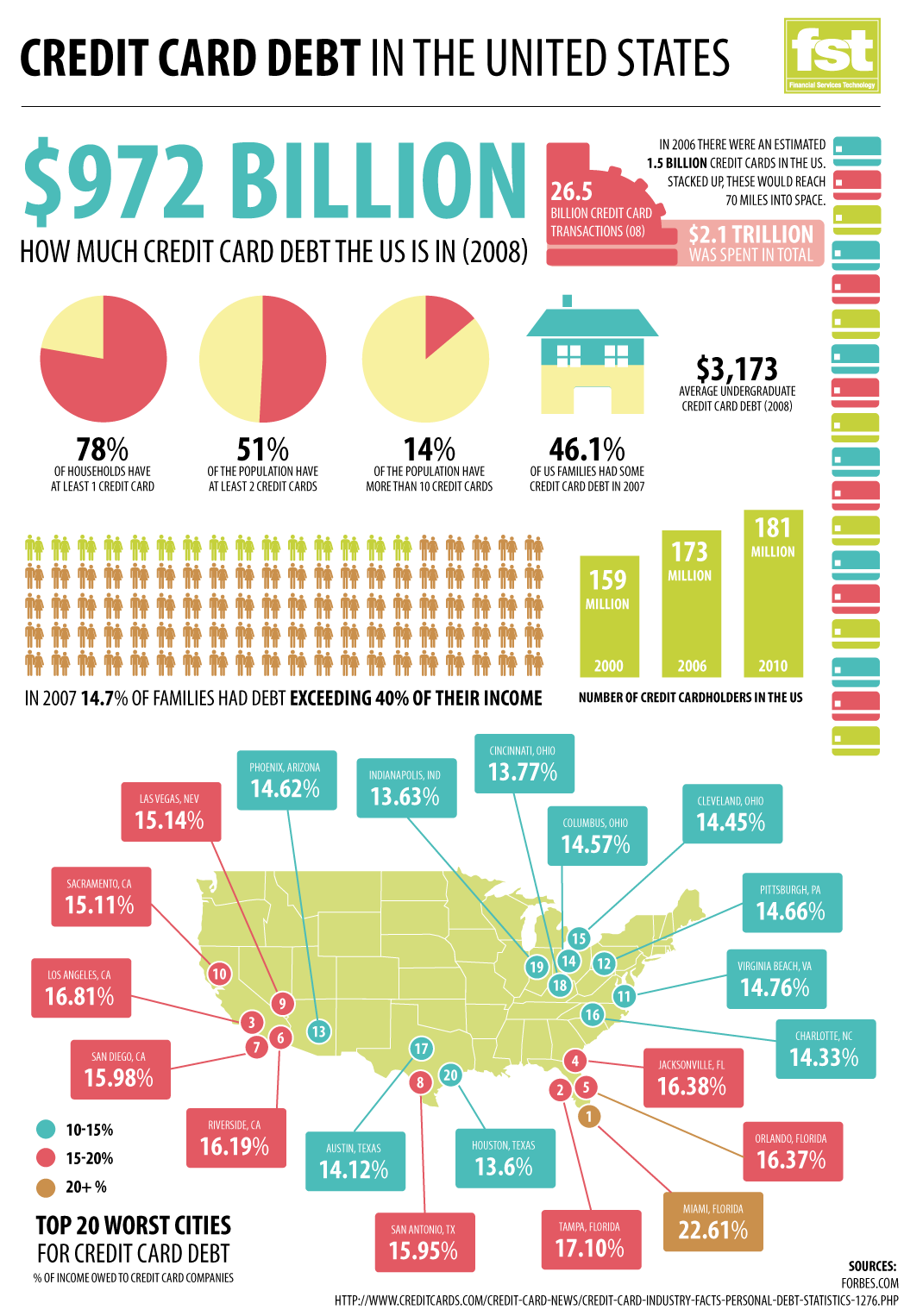
Infographic about credit card debt in the US (2010)

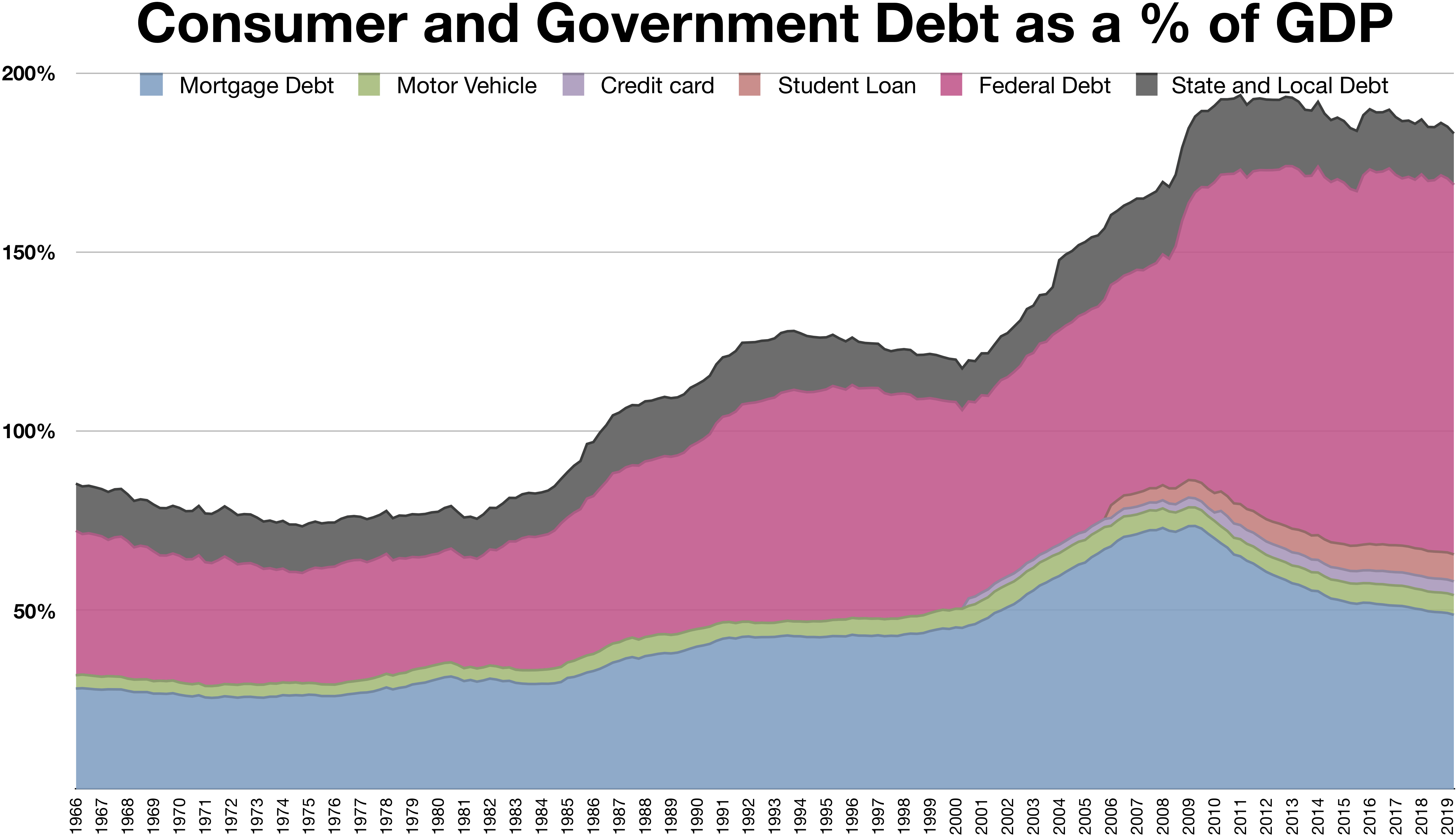
Consumer and government debt as a % of GDP (United States)

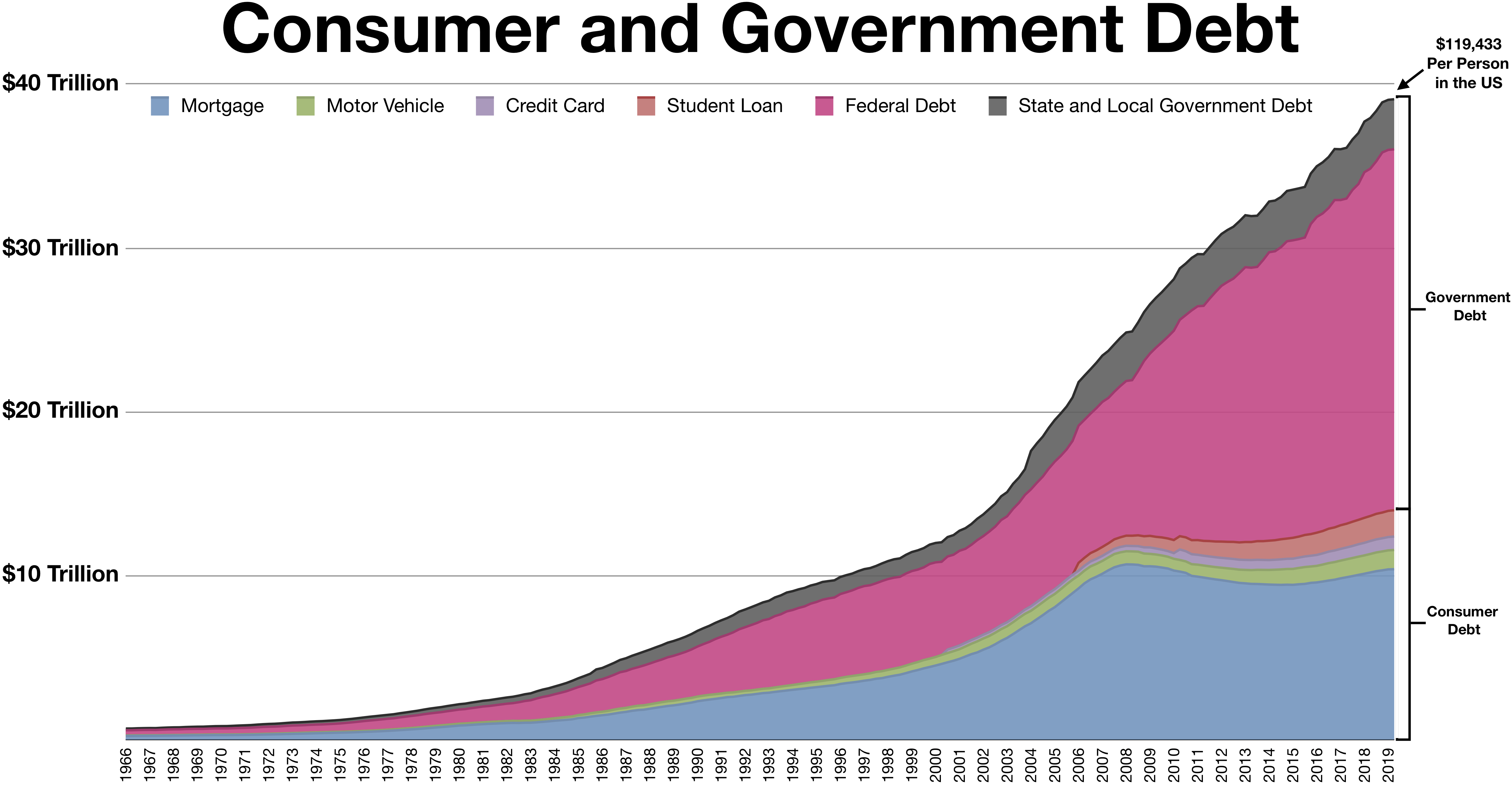
Consumer and government debt in the United States

Credit card debt results when a client of a credit card company purchases an item or service through the card system. Debt grows through the accrual of interest and penalties when the consumer fails to repay the company for the money they have spent.

If the debt is not paid on time, the company will charge a late-payment penalty and report the late payment to credit rating agencies. Late payment is sometimes referred to as "default". The late-payment penalty increases the customer's total debt.

A customer's interest rate may be significantly increased as a result of them missing multiple payments. The penalty Annual percentage rate (APR) varies between card-issuing companies and is usually disclosed in literature at the time of a credit card application, and also on a paper notification that is sent with the credit card to the customer's residence.

Research shows people with credit card debt are more likely than others to forgo medical care than others and that the likelihood of forgone medical care increases with the magnitude of credit card debt.

== Statistics ==
Quarterly credit card debt in the United States since 1986 (in billions):

- Q3 2016: $927.1
- Q3 2014: $833.8
- Q4 2012: $828.8
- Q4 2011: $834.4
- Q1 2011: $776.6
- Q4 2010: $833.1
- Q4 2008: $984.2
- Q4 2000: $688.2
- Q4 1990: $245.9
- Q3 1986: $133.5

Total credit card debt in various countries (or territories)
| Country | Date | Amount |
Europe
| Germany | November 2020 | €7.7 billion |
| Netherlands | November 2020 | €1.0 billion |
| Sweden | December 2020 | 63.0 billion kr (SEK) |
| United Kingdom | September 2020 | £59.2 billion |
Asia
| Hong Kong | September 2020 | $22.7 billion (HKD) |
| Singapore | December 2020 | $10.3 billion (SGD) |
| Taiwan | January 2021 | $105.5 billion (TWD) |
Other countries
| Australia | July 2026 | $19.4 billion (AUD) |
| Mexico | March 2020 | $13.4 billion (MXN) |
| New Zealand | November 2020 | $6.5 billion (NZD) |
| South Africa | September 2020 | R131.2 billion (ZAR) |

Declines in credit card debt are often misinterpreted because they omit information about charge-offs. Declines in credit card debt may be caused by consumers paying off their debt, credit card companies writing off charged-off debt, or a combination of both. The inclusion of charged-off debt can significantly affect debt trends and the characterization of a nation's financial health.

Consumers commonly pay off a large portion of their credit card debt in the first fiscal quarter of the year because this tends to be when people receive holiday bonuses and tax refunds. Credit card debt tends to increase throughout the rest of the year.

Credit card debt is said to be higher in industrialized countries. The average U.S. college graduate begins their post-college days with more than $2,000 in credit card debt. The median credit card debt in the U.S. is $3,000 and number of cards held is two.

The Federal Reserve Bank of New York reported that U.S. credit card balances increased by $50 billion during the fourth quarter of 2023, reaching $1.13 trillion. On an annualized basis, about 8.5 percent of credit card balances transitioned into delinquency during the quarter, while the flow into serious delinquency was 6.36 percent, up from 4.01 percent one year earlier.

== Relieving credit card debt ==
Bankrate advises people with credit card debt to look for options and use what they find to try to negotiate a reduced rate from their current credit card provider(s). On May 25, 2023, Bankrate reported some companies offer "a 0 percent intro APR for 21 months from account opening on purchases and qualifying balance transfers, (18.24%, 24.74%, or 29.99% variable APR thereafter)".

After the start of the Great Recession in December 2007, multiple-credit-card debt-relief options became widely popular for U.S. residents with unsecured debt of over $5,000.

Debt-relief options available in the U.S. include:

- Debt settlement
- Debt consolidation
- Credit counseling
- Chapter 7 bankruptcy and Chapter 13 bankruptcy

Although each of these debt-relief options deals with credit card debt, they are also able to deal with other types of debt. including personal loans, medical debt, accounts in collections and more, epending on the program type. These programs have not been enough to help enough Americans get out of debt, resulting in economists calling for action and a massive debt bailout by government.

As of 2024, credit card issuers are required to disclose to the customer how much money a balance will take to pay off if only the minimum payment is made on their billing statement.

== Credit score effects ==
Debtors who pay their debts on time and keep their credit utilization under 30% tend to have a higher credit score. "Maxing out" or using most of one's available credit, along with late or missed payments, negatively affects credit scores. Total credit utilization, payment history, and the length of credit history are among the factors that determine a consumer's credit score.

The overall score of a debtor depends on both the score model and the credit bureau used to calculate a particular score.

== Bankruptcy ==
In the U.S., a consumer has the right to dismiss certain types of debt under U.S. Chapter 7 and Chapter 13 bankruptcy laws but to do so, they must fulfill certain obligations. A bankruptcy expert reviews the debt with the debtor prior to proceeding with these actions. Certain kinds of debt reviewed may be considered fraud if it is discovered a line of credit was used to make unusually large purchases or cash advances 60 days before the bankruptcy case was filed.

== Political aspects ==
Some credit card companies have attempted to lobby at the U.S. federal level to tighten U.S. bankruptcy laws to make the cancellation of credit card debts more difficult.

== Legal issues ==
Once a debt is handed to a collection agency, the agency will attempt to recover the customer's unsecured debt. If a debt-collection agency is unable to collect a debt despite attempting to do so, it may use legal action in court to attempt recovery of the debt. A successful judgement against the debtor can include seizure and garnishment of assets including bank accounts and wages in order to pay off outstanding debts.

Customers have rights under the U.S. Fair Debt Collection Practice Act, which specifies they can ask in writing a debt-collection agency to stop calling them about a debt. This does not stop the collection process but may lead to a legal challenge if a no-contact request is made.

If the statute of limitations has passed in certain U.S. states and legal actions have not been issued against the debtor, a collection agency must remove the outstanding debt from their credit report. The process in the U.S. varies between states.

== Forgiveness of credit card debt ==
A collection agency or credit card issuer may choose to forgive the entire debt, relieving the debtor of the need to repay the debt. In the U.S., this results in the sending of a 1099 C tax form to the debtor, which the debtor is required to file. In the U.S., the reportable amount varies between states.

== See also ==
- Maxed Out – 2006 documentary about credit card debt and the national deficit.
- Debt collection – A detailed process outlining the recovery of personal debt.
