= Household debt =

Combined debt of all people in a household

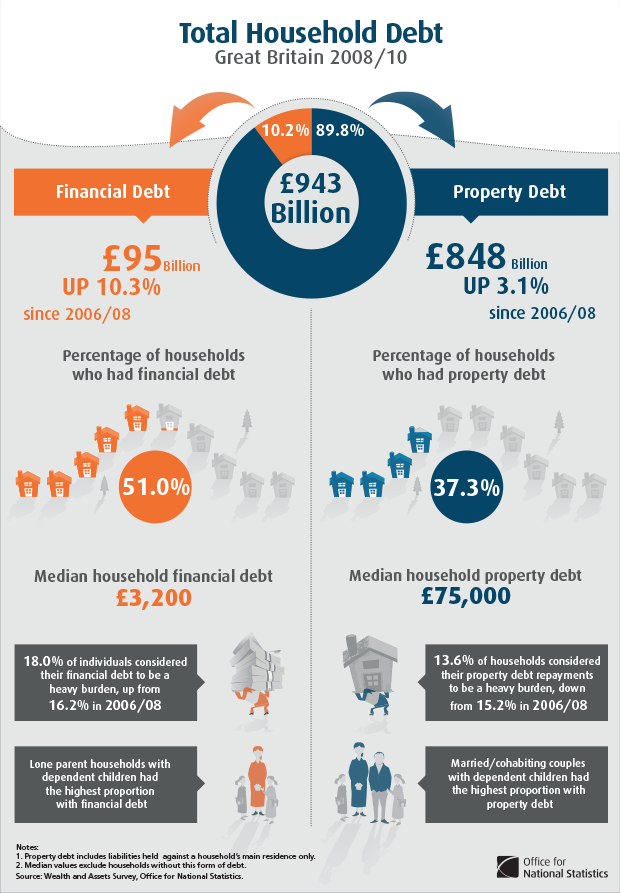
Household debt in Great Britain 2008-10

Household debt is the combined debt of all people in a household, including consumer debt and mortgage loans. A significant rise in the level of this debt coincides historically with many severe economic crises and was a cause of the U.S. and subsequent euro area crisis. Several economists have argued that lowering this debt is essential to economic recovery in the U.S. and selected Eurozone countries.

== Overview ==
Household debt can be defined in several ways, based on what types of debt are included. Common debt types include home mortgages, home equity loans, auto loans, student loans, and credit cards. Household debt can also be measured across an economy, to measure how indebted households are relative to various measures of income (e.g., pre-tax and disposable income) or relative to the size of the economy (GDP).

The burden of debt can also be measured in terms of the amount of interest it generates relative to the income of the borrower. For example, the U.S. Federal Reserve measures the "household debt service ratio" (DSR), an estimate of the ratio of debt payments to disposable personal income. Debt payments consist of the estimated required payments on outstanding mortgage and consumer debt. The Fed also measures the "financial obligations ratio" (FOR), which adds automobile lease payments, rental payments on tenant-occupied property, homeowners' insurance, and property tax payments to the debt service ratio. Homeowner and renter FORs are calculated by applying homeowner and renter shares of payments and income derived from the Survey of Consumer Finances and Current Population Survey to the numerator and denominator of the FOR. The homeowner mortgage FOR includes payments on mortgage debt, homeowners' insurance, and property taxes, while the homeowner consumer FOR includes payments on consumer debt and automobile leases.

== Historical perspective ==
In the 20th century, spending on consumer durables rose significantly. Household debt rose as living standards rose, and consumers demanded an array of durable goods. These included major durables like high-end electronics, vehicles, and appliances, that were purchased with credit. Easy credit encouraged a shift from saving to spending. This trend has continued into the 2020s where swiping a credit card has become a standard in day-to-day life

Households in developed countries significantly increased their household debt relative to their disposable income and GDP from 1980 to 2007 — one of the many factors that led to the subprime mortgage crisis and the euro area crisis. Research indicates that U.S. household debt increased from 43% to 62% of GDP from 1982 to 2000. Looking at the early years of the 21st century, many industrialized countries, with a notable exception of Germany, experienced a major spike of household debt versus GDP around 2007–8, with the United States leading up to 2007; by 2017, the American ratio was second only to that of the United Kingdom.

U.S. households made significant progress in deleveraging (reducing debt) post-crisis, much of it due to foreclosures and financial institution debt write-downs. By some measures, consumers began to add certain types of debt again in 2012, a sign that the economy may be improving as this borrowing supports consumption. According to the Federal Reserve Bank of New York's Consumer Credit Panel, U.S. household debt balances totaled $18.771 trillion in the second quarter of 2026, $13 billion below the preceding quarter and $383 billion above the same quarter a year earlier. These balances included $13.117 trillion in mortgage debt, $1.713 trillion in auto debt, $1.651 trillion in student debt, and $1.263 trillion in credit card debt. At the end of the quarter, 4.7% of outstanding debt was in some stage of delinquency. The bank stated that most of the reported quarterly decline in mortgage balances resulted from a temporary reporting gap during a transfer of servicing.

== Global economic impact ==
The International Monetary Fund (IMF) reported in April 2012:

"Household debt soared in the years leading up to the Great Recession. In advanced economies, during the five years preceding 2007, the ratio of household debt to income rose by an average of 39 percentage points, to 138 percent. In Denmark, Iceland, Ireland, the Netherlands, and Norway, debt peaked at more than 200 percent of household income. A surge in household debt to historic highs also occurred in emerging economies such as Estonia, Hungary, Latvia, and Lithuania. This occurred largely because the central banks implemented a prolonged period of artificially low policy interest rates, temporarily increasing the amount of debt that could be serviced with a given income. The leveraging up fueled a consumption boom that, ironically, boosted GDP in the countries in question, but represented not a sustainable 'boost to aggregate demand' but instead a mere pulling forward of consumption, as people took on new 30-40 year debt to pay for current year expenditures.

The predictable fallout of this policy is the slow growth that these countries are experiencing today. At the time, the concurrent boom in both house prices and the stock market - as the prices of financed and financial assets were bid up by virtue of the same low rates - meant that household debt relative to assets held broadly stable, which masked households' growing exposure to the eventual sharp fall in asset prices. House prices in particular were vulnerable to sharp movements in policy rates in countries in which most mortgages are adjustable-rate, as 30-40 year loans are highly rate sensitive, house purchases are financed at 80-95% of the price, and only 4-5% of homes change owners in a year.

Despite this low volume, the appraisal rules in most countries limit the number of times that a sale can serve as a comp only in terms of time (12 months), not the number of times that a given sale can be used as a comp - because of this, a "cash out refi boom" followed the low-rate-driven-price-increase - this was the primary vehicle through which developed countries' households leveraged up. On the supply side, home builders are also financed at short rates (in the US, Prime). Their cost of capital was effectively cut in half by virtue of the central bank rate cuts, enabling them to overbuild in response to the rise in prices - with all the new supply making the eventual price collapse worse than it would otherwise have been.

The entire episode was straight out of Ludwig von Mises' 'Human Action', Chapter 20, with the new twist that most of the debt was incurred on the consumer side. When rising consumer prices forced the central banks to allow policy rates to rise back up toward market rates, the wind propping up house prices was taken away. House prices immediately declined, leading to the 2008 financial crisis. Many households, who had reduced their savings out of a belief in the "wealth effect," saw their wealth shrink relative to their debt, and, with less income and more unemployment, especially in the previously booming real estate sector, found it harder to meet mortgage payments. "Strategic defaults" became common, as homeowners with significant negative equity simply abandoned the home and the debt.

By the end of 2011, real house prices had fallen from their peak by about 41% in Ireland, 29% in Iceland, 23% in Spain and the United States, and 21% in Denmark. Household defaults, underwater mortgages (where the loan balance exceeds the house value), foreclosures, and fire sales became endemic to a number of economies. Household deleveraging by paying off debts or defaulting on them has begun in some countries. It has been most pronounced in the United States, where about two-thirds of the debt reduction reflects defaults.

Of note, Germany, in which almost all mortgages carry 10 year pricing, and in which the 10 year interest rate did not decline during the 2000s, no housing bubble occurred at all. Also, in Canada, in which most mortgages are ARMs but 3-5 year, and which experienced a muted drop in intermediate-term rates, the housing bubble was more muted than in neighboring US.

== Statistics ==
Among OECD countries, the larger share of all household debt is represented by mortgages, the incidence of which varies across countries, between 60% and 90% of total household debt.

2022 Household debt
No.	Country	% of GDP
1	Switzerland	128.3%
2	Australia	111.75%
3	South Korea	105.09%
4	Canada	102.39%
5	Hong Kong	95.75%
6	Netherlands	94.85%
7	New Zealand	94.45%
8	Sweden	88.23%
9	Thailand	86.9%
10	Denmark	86.22%

=== United States ===
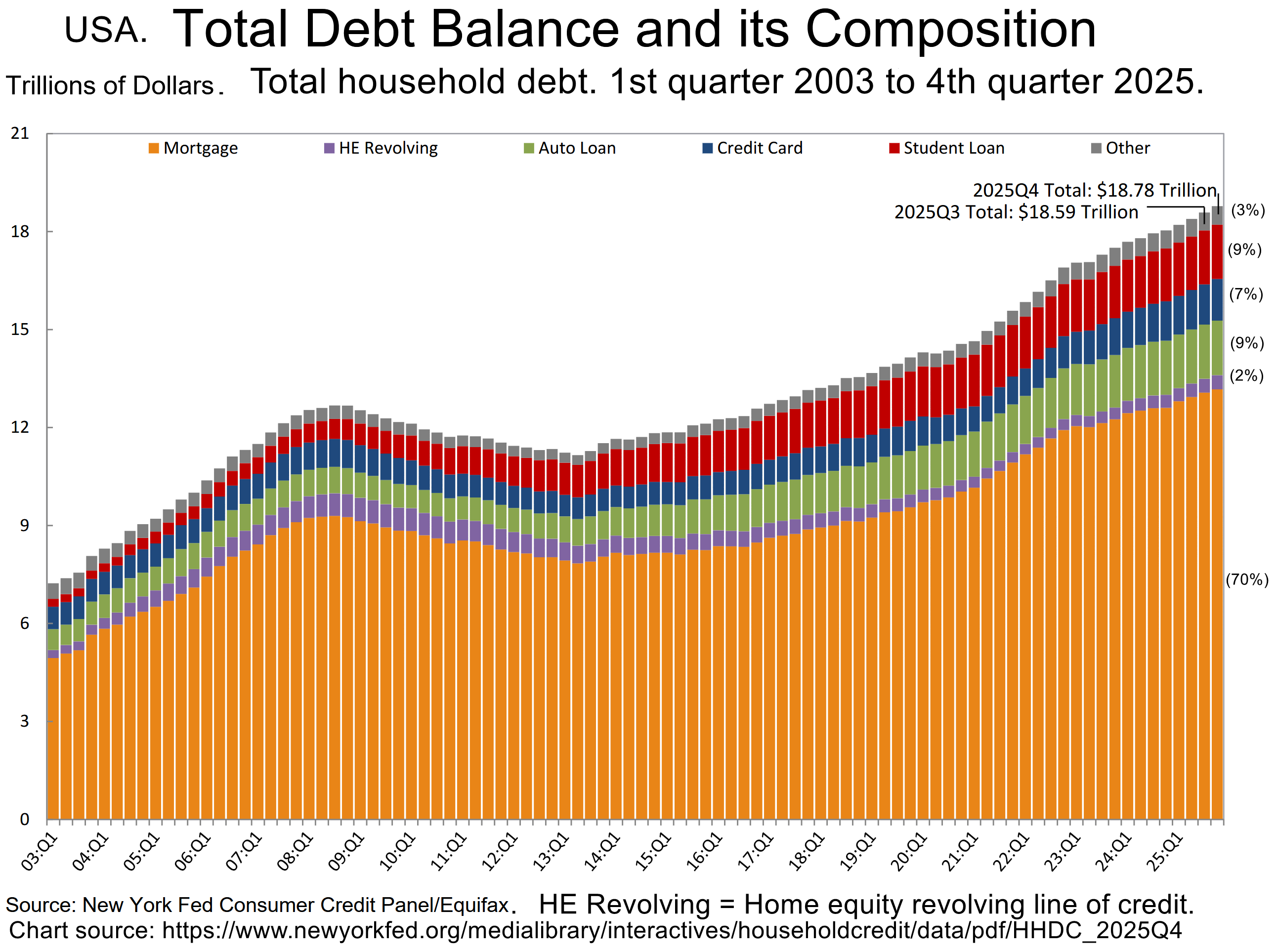
Total US household debt timeline. Top to bottom: Other Student loans Credit cards Auto loans Home equity revolving line of credit Mortgage

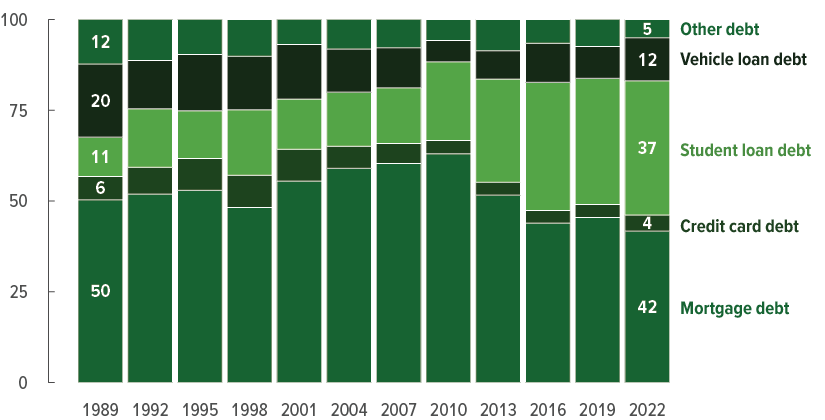
Household debt of people in the US in the bottom 25% by wealth.

U.S. household (HH) debt (measured by the FRED variable "CMDEBT") rose relative to both GDP and disposable income over the 1980 to 2011 period.

- Household debt as a % disposable income rose from 68% in 1980 to a peak of 128% in 2007, prior to dropping to 112% by 2011.
- Household debt as a % nominal GDP rose from 47% in 1980 to a peak of 94% in 2009, prior to dropping to 77% in 2012.
- U.S. household debt rose from nearly zero in the 1950s to $13.8 trillion in 2008, before declining to $12.9 trillion by Q2 2012.

Consumer credit outstanding includes credit cards, auto loans, student loans, and other types of household debt, but excludes mortgages. It rose from 14.0% GDP in January 1990 to 18.0% GDP by January 2009. It fell to a trough of 16.4% GDP in July 2010 and was back up to 17.5% GDP by January 2013.

== In United States ==
=== Contribution to the 2008 financial crisis ===
This increase in debt from 1980 to 2007 enabled spending that stimulated the economy, arguably "papering over" or hiding the sustainable economic growth rate excluding this increase in leverage. This debt overhang then began holding back the economy as consumers paid down debt (which reduces economic activity) rather than spending.

Paul Krugman wrote in December 2010: "The root of our current troubles lies in the debt American families ran up during the Bush-era housing bubble. Twenty years ago, the average American household’s debt was 83 percent of its income; by a decade ago, that had crept up to 92 percent; but by late 2007, debts were 130 percent of income. All this borrowing took place both because banks had abandoned any notion of sound lending and because everyone assumed that house prices would never fall. And then the bubble burst. What we’ve been dealing with ever since is a painful process of 'deleveraging': highly indebted Americans not only can't spend the way they used to, they're having to pay down the debts they ran up in the bubble years. This would be fine if someone else were taking up the slack. But what's actually happening is that some people are spending much less while nobody is spending more—and this translates into a depressed economy and high unemployment. What the government should be doing in this situation is spending more while the private sector is spending less, supporting employment while those debts are paid down. And this government spending needs to be sustained: we're not talking about a brief burst of aid; we’re talking about spending that lasts long enough for households to get their debts back under control. The original Obama stimulus wasn’t just too small; it was also much too short-lived, with much of the positive effect already gone."

In April 2009, U.S. Federal Reserve Vice Chair Janet Yellen discussed the situation: "Once this massive credit crunch hit, it didn’t take long before we were in a recession. The recession, in turn, deepened the credit crunch as demand and employment fell, and credit losses of financial institutions surged. Indeed, we have been in the grips of precisely this adverse feedback loop for more than a year. A process of balance sheet deleveraging [paying down debt] has spread to nearly every corner of the economy. Consumers are pulling back on purchases, especially on durable goods, to build their savings. Businesses are cancelling planned investments and laying off workers to preserve cash. And, financial institutions are shrinking assets to bolster capital and improve their chances of weathering the current storm. Once again, Minsky understood this dynamic. He spoke of the paradox of deleveraging, in which precautions that may be smart for individuals and firms—and indeed essential to return the economy to a normal state—nevertheless magnify the distress of the economy as a whole."

The policy prescription of Ms Yellen's predecessor Mr Bernanke was to increase the money supply and artificially reduce interest rates. This stoked another debt and asset bubble. Mr Krugman's policy was to ensure that such borrowing took place at the federal government level, to be repaid via taxes on the individuals who he admitted were already overburdened with their own debts. These policies were arguably a mere return to the policies that inflated the debt bubble in the first place.

Economists Atif Mian and Amir Sufi wrote in 2014 that:

- Historically, severe economic downturns are almost always preceded by a sharp increase in household debt.
- U.S. household spending declines were largest in geographic areas with a combination of higher household debt and larger price declines.
- When housing prices fall, poorer homeowners (with a larger proportion of their net worth in their home) are hit the hardest financially and reduce their consumption relatively more than wealthier households.
- Declines in residential investment preceded the recession and were followed by reductions in household spending and then non-residential business investment as the recession worsened.

=== Effects on economic growth ===
Ezra Klein wrote in August 2011: "[W]hat distinguishes crises like this one from typical recessions is household debt. When the financial markets collapsed, household debt was nearly 100 percent of GDP. It’s now down to 90 percent. In 1982, which was the last time we had a big recession, the household-debt-to-GDP ratio was about 45 percent. That means that in this crisis, indebted households can’t spend, which means businesses can’t spend, which means that unless government steps into the breach in a massive way or until households work through their debt burden, we can’t recover. In the 1982 recession, households could spend, and so when the Federal Reserve lowered interest rates and made spending attractive, we accelerated out of the recession. The utility of calling this downturn a “household-debt crisis” is it tells you where to put your focus: you either need to make consumers better able to pay their debts, which you can do through conventional stimulus policy like tax cuts and jobs programs, or you need to make their debts smaller so they're better able to pay them, which you can do by forgiving some of their debt through policies like [mortgage principal reduction] or eroding the value of their debt by increasing inflation. I’ve heard various economist make various smart points about why we should prefer one approach or the other, and it also happens to be the case that the two policies support each other and so we don't actually need to choose between them. All of these solutions, of course, have drawbacks: if you put the government deeper into debt in order to help households now, you increase the risk of a public-debt crisis later. That's why it's wise to pair further short-term stimulus with a large amount of long-term deficit reduction. If you force banks to swallow losses or face inflation now, you need to worry about whether they'll be able to keep lending at a pace that will support recovery over the next few years. But as we’re seeing, not doing enough isn't a safe strategy, either."

Economist Amir Sufi at the University of Chicago argued in July 2011 that a high level of household debt was holding back the U.S. economy. Households focused on paying down private debt are not able to consume at historical levels. He advocates mortgage write-downs and other debt-related solutions to re-invigorate the economy when household debt levels are exceptionally high. Several European countries also had high household debt levels relative to historical averages leading up to the European sovereign-debt crisis. Recent research also supports the view that excessive household leverage has contributed to the weakness in consumption.

=== Effects on employment ===
Rana Foroohar wrote in July 2012: "[R]esearch shows that the majority of job losses in the U.S. since the Great Recession were due to lower consumer spending because of household debt, a decline that resulted in layoffs at U.S. firms. Parting back debt is the precursor to greater spending and greater growth."

=== Effects on economic recovery ===
Neil Irwin explained the economic effects of rising consumer credit outstanding (i.e., all types of household debt other than mortgages) in July 2013: "Americans are finally feeling more confident about the economy and thus willing to take on debt. Lenders, meanwhile, are growing more comfortable extending loans. The spending enabled by this rising consumer debt can help create a virtuous cycle in which more demand for goods and services creates more jobs, which creates rising income. Indeed, more borrowing by households (and the spending that results) is likely offsetting some of the pain caused by federal spending cuts and deficit reduction."

=== Charts of U.S. household debt variables ===
- FRED – Household Debt to GDP Ratio
- FRED - Mortgage and Consumer Credit Debt Relative to GDP
- FRED - Household Debt Dollars (CMDEBT)
- FRED - Change in Household Debt Dollars by Quarter (CMDEBT)
- FRED – Household Debt Service Payments as a Percent of Disposable Personal Income (TDSP)
- FRED – Household Financial Obligations as a Percent of Disposable Personal Income (FODSP)

== Reducing household debt ==
Household debt can be challenging to reduce. Major approaches include:

- Paying down debt over time from income or accumulated savings, if available
- Debt write-down or refinancing via negotiation, bankruptcy or government bailout
- Inflation, although if wage increases do not exceed inflation, this approach is mostly academic

=== Paying off debt from income or savings ===
Since most middle income households have the majority of their wealth invested in their home, paying down debt from income can take a decade or longer when a housing bubble bursts, as it did for much of the developed world in 2007–2012. For example, this debt accumulated over a 30-year period (1980–2007 peak) in the U.S. and much of the increase was mortgage-related.

=== Debt restructuring or write-down ===
Debt can sometimes be reduced by negotiation with creditors or by a legal bankruptcy process, which can result in dismissal of certain types of debt such as credit cards. Some lenders may agree to write down mortgage values (reducing the homeowner's obligation) rather than taking even larger losses in foreclosure. Economist Joseph Stiglitz argued for a rapid bankruptcy process for homeowners, to allow debts to be written down.

Economists Joseph Stiglitz and Mark Zandi both advocated significant mortgage refinancing or write-downs in August 2012. They explained that more than four million Americans lost their homes since the housing bubble began bursting in 2006. An additional 3.5 million homeowners are in the foreclosure process or are so delinquent on payments that they will be soon. Roughly 13.5 million homeowners are underwater (in negative equity), meaning they owe more than their home is now worth, increasing the odds that millions more will lose their homes. The household debt and foreclosures are significantly holding back the economy.

Economists Kenneth S. Rogoff and Carmen M. Reinhart wrote in April 2013: "In the United States, we support reducing mortgage principal on homes that are underwater (where the mortgage is higher than the value of the home). We have also written about plausible solutions that involve moderately higher inflation and “financial repression” — pushing down inflation-adjusted interest rates, which effectively amounts to a tax on bondholders. This strategy contributed to the significant debt reductions that followed World War II.

Professor Luigi Zingales (University of Chicago) advocated a mortgage debt for equity swap in July 2009, where the mortgage debt would be written down in exchange for the bank taking an interest in future appreciation of the home upon sale (a debt-for-equity swap). Fund Manager John Hussman also advocated debt-for-equity swaps for households and banks during April 2009.

Journalist Steven Clemons wrote in July 2012: "The Great Recession of 2008–2009, from which there are still repercussions in the US and global economies, resulted from a massive surge in consumer loans—98% in just five years—and ... the combined total of US business and consumer loans is basically at the same level as at the moment this crisis hit." He argued for debt forgiveness or restructuring to help stimulate the economy.

During the Great Depression, the U.S. created the Home Owners' Loan Corporation (HOLC), which acquired and refinanced one million delinquent mortgages between 1933 and 1936.

=== Inflation ===
If wages increase due to inflation, but debts remain fixed, the debts can be more easily repaid. Economists may advocate increasing inflation to help reduce the debt burden in highly leveraged economies. For example, economist Kenneth Rogoff has advocated both mortgage write-downs and inflation during August 2011: "I argued that the only practical way to shorten the coming period of painful deleveraging and slow growth would be a sustained burst of moderate inflation, say, 4–6% for several years. Of course, inflation is an unfair and arbitrary transfer of income from savers to debtors. But, at the end of the day, such a transfer is the most direct approach to faster recovery. Eventually, it will take place one way or another, anyway, as Europe is painfully learning." He also suggested that the government could take an equity interest in the homes in exchange for paying down the mortgages.

== Household over-indebtedness ==
While it is challenging to define over-indebtedness, definitions of over-indebtedness tend to have a few core elements in common. The first one refers to the capacity to meet the expenses associated with the contracted financial commitments. Over-indebtedness implies an inability to meet such recurring expenses. Second, this inability is structural. This is the time dimension, which holds that the definition must capture persistent and ongoing financial problems and exclude one-off occurrences that arise due to forgetfulness, for instance. The third core element refers to standard of living. The household must be unable to meet contracted commitments without reducing its minimum standard of living expenses. Fourth, comes illiquidity. The household is unable to remedy the situation by recourse to (financial and non-financial) assets and other financial sources such as credit. Lastly, all contracted financial commitments are included, among them mortgage and consumer credit commitments, utility and telephone bills as well as rent payments (recurring expenses).

Causes of over-indebtedness can be diverse. A 'risky life event' (for example, unemployment, relationship break-up, leaving the parental home, business failure, illness or unexpected home repairs. Such events can trigger income and expenditure shocks) can lie at the root, sometimes instantly turning indebtedness into over-indebtedness. Other households have unconsciously, or consciously, gradually become over-committed. They make use of available forms of credit, sometimes without realizing that they might not be able to repay in the future. Lack of financial management skills and aggressive marketing by lenders may both lie at the origin of this. Another potential cause includes escalating consumption habits. The third group of people are the least well-off. They need to obtain credit in order to attain a reasonable standard of living. They are frequently subject to relatively high interest rates. Potential consequences for the over-indebted household include financial hardship, depression, poor health, relationship breakdown, exclusion from basic financial services, a strain on social relations, absenteeism at work and lack of organizational commitment, a feeling of insecurity. A 2026 survey by Accredited Debt Relief found that 35% of people said they had reduced their grocery spending because of debt.

Responses to household over-indebtedness can be preventive, alleviative and rehabilitative. Preventive measures include financial education and regulation. An example of the last is the European Union's "Directive on Credit Agreements for Consumers Household debt advisory services". It stipulates, for example, that lenders should list the interest rates they change in a homogenized way (yearly rates) and that paper contracts should be signed for debts above a certain amounts, thus inhibiting for example impulsive borrowing through SMS-loans. Alleviative measures include debt advisory services, which aim to help households getting their finances back on track, mainly by means of information provision, budget planning and balancing, help with legal arrangements, negotiation with creditors, providing psychological support by having someone to talk to, and even by effectively, voluntarily taking over the managing of a household's finances. Rehabilitative measures include consumer bankruptcy and legal debt settlement procedures. While precise arrangements vary largely between countries, in general such procedures work as follows. During such procedures, the over-indebted household hands over all income above a minimum threshold to the creditors/state and is cleared of its debts after the period, varying in length from for example 1 year in the UK to 5 in Portugal and 12 in Ireland.

== See also ==
- Net worth
