= Sponsored repayment =

Personal finance strategy

Sponsored repayment is a personal finance strategy where consumers enter into an arrangement with one or a coalition of sponsors so that a portion of the consumer's purchases at the sponsor are rebated to fund payments to financial obligations like utility bills, credit cards, and student loans. Sponsored repayment benefits consumers by helping them accumulate rebates to fund payments to creditors and benefits sponsors through encouraging customer loyalty.

Sponsored repayment is most effective when consumers earn rewards from purchases they already make and do not overspend in an effort to accumulate rewards, thus reducing the risk of taking on a larger financial obligation than they have capacity to pay.

== See also ==
- Debt management
- Personal finance
- Loyalty programs
- Cashback website
