= Brian Doubles =

American business executive (born c. 1975)

- Born: c. 1975
- Education: Michigan State University (BS)
- Occupation: Business executive
- Years active: 1997–present
- Employer: Synchrony Financial
- Title: President and chief executive officer

Brian Doubles (born c. 1975) is an American business executive who has served as president and chief executive officer (CEO) of Synchrony Financial since April 2021. He previously served as Synchrony's president and as executive vice president and chief financial officer, leading the financial structuring behind the company's 2014 initial public offering and 2015 separation from General Electric (GE).

== Early life and education ==
Doubles was born c. 1975. He attended Michigan State University, graduating with a bachelor's degree in engineering.

== Career ==
=== General Electric ===
In 1997, Doubles began his career at General Electric through a management development program. Over the following decade, he held financial and leadership roles across several GE business units, specializing in corporate audit, treasury, and consumer finance. In 2009, he was appointed CFO of GE Capital's Retail Consumer Finance unit in North America.

=== Synchrony Financial ===
==== Chief financial officer ====
When GE spun off its retail finance arm as Synchrony Financial, Doubles served as executive vice president, chief financial officer, and treasurer. He led the financial structuring and execution of Synchrony's $2.88 billion IPO in July 2014. Doubles directed the establishment of Synchrony's independent balance sheet, capital planning, and standalone treasury operations until GE fully divested its remaining shares in late 2015.

==== President and CEO ====
Doubles was appointed president of Synchrony in May 2019, taking responsibility for enterprise strategy, mergers and acquisitions, marketing, data analytics, and strategic venture investments. During his tenure as president, Synchrony agreed to acquire Allegro Credit, a healthcare-focused installment lender.

In January 2021, Synchrony announced that Doubles would succeed Margaret Keane as CEO, taking office in April 2021 and joining the board of directors.

In June 2021, Doubles reorganized Synchrony's structure, replacing the company's Retail Card, Payment Solutions, and CareCredit divisions with five platforms organized by partner industry: Digital, Health & Wellness, Home & Auto, Diversified & Value, and Lifestyle.

Doubles has commented publicly on issues affecting the consumer finance industry. In a 2021 Associated Press interview, he discussed competition from buy now, pay later lenders and consumer financial health during the COVID-19 pandemic.

Doubles has written about corporate leadership and technology for Fortune. He has also appeared on the New York Stock Exchange's Inside the ICE House podcast to discuss Synchrony and its development following the company's IPO.

== Board memberships and philanthropy ==
Doubles serves on the board of directors of Synchrony Financial and is a member of the Business Roundtable and the Bank Policy Institute. In 2015, he established an annual corporate charitable polar bear plunge event, raising funds for nonprofit groups such as the SeriousFun Children's Network.
