= Margaret M. Keane =

2014–2021 chief executive officer of Synchrony

- Born: 1959 (age 66–67)
- Education: St. John’s University (BA 1981, MBA 1987)
- Occupation: CEO
- Known for: One of the first female CEOs of a multibillion dollar bank

Margaret Keane (born 1959) is an American businesswoman who was the chief executive officer of Synchrony from February 2014 through April 2021 when she transitioned to the role of executive chair of Synchrony’s board of directors. When Synchrony was spun off from General Electric as an independent bank, it became the most valuable bank in the US with a woman CEO. Keane is one of only three women, the others being Beth Mooney of KeyCorp and Jane Fraser of Citigroup, who lead an independently traded US bank whose value is over $10 billion.

== Early life and education ==
Keane was raised in New York City, where her father was a police officer. His expectation for his six children was to follow in his footsteps into law enforcement. All of Margaret's five siblings did just that, either themselves or marrying someone in law enforcement, but she decided instead to attend St. John's University in Queens, New York, where she earned a BA in government and politics in 1981 and her MBA in 1987.

== Career ==
In 1980, when in college, she took a part-time job as a telephone debt collector at CitiCorp. During the following 16 years Keane climbed the ranks at CitiCorp until she was running their US retail operations. She then joined GE Capital. In 2011 she became the CEO of the firm's credit-card business, after filling several different capacities in operations and quality control, and finally in the credit card division.

In 1996 Keane moved to GE and worked as Quality Leader for GE Capital's Vendor Financial Services (VFS) division. Keane served as Chief Quality Leader of GECC from January 2000 until December 2001. In 2002 she joined GE Consumer Finance-Americas where she was Senior Vice President for Operations. Keane joined GE Capital Retail Consumer Finance in May, 2004. There she led the retail credit business. She was CEO and President of GE's Retail Card platform for their North American retail finance business from June 2004 until April 2011. In 2005 Keane was named as a GE Officer. On November 29, 2005 she was named the chief executive officer and president of Retail Consumer Finance of Americas Operations at GE. Since April 2011 Keane served as the CEO and president of GE's North American retail finance business.

In July 2014 GE Capital led Synchrony, a new independent company, which was now the largest private-label credit card provider in the US. With the launch of Synchrony Keane became one of only two women CEOs running US-owned, independent, publicly traded banks valued at over $10 billion.

== Recognition and honors ==
In the October 2011 issue of American Banker magazine, Keane was recognized as the 15th of 25 Most Powerful Women in Finance. In 2012 her alma mater, St. John's University, honored her with the Alumni Outstanding Achievement Award.
