= Latitude Financial Services =

Australian financial services company

- Type: Public
- Traded as: ASX: LFS
- Industry: Financial services
- Founded: 2015
- Headquarters: Melbourne, Australia
- Area served: Australia; New Zealand
- Key people: Bob Belan (CEO); Mike Tilley (Chairman)
- Products: Personal Loans; Credit Cards; Car Loans; Interest Free Retail Finance
- Net income: $31 million (2024)
- Website: latitudefinancial.com.au

Latitude Financial Services is an Australian financial services company with headquarters in Melbourne, also doing business in New Zealand under the name Gem Finance. Latitude's core business is in consumer finance through a variety of services including secured and unsecured personal loans, credit cards, car loans and interest free retail finance. As of 2018 it had around a 6% share of Australia's personal lending market, making it the biggest non-bank lender of consumer credit in Australia.

== History ==
Latitude began as the Australian and New Zealand personal finance and motor dealer finance operations of Australian Guarantee Corporation acquired from Westpac in 2002 by GE Capital.

GE Capital sold its Australian and New Zealand business in 2015 to a consortium led by Deutsche Bank, KKR and Värde Partners. The business was renamed Latitude Financial Services.

On 20 April 2021, Latitude completed an initial public offering at $2.60 per share and became listed on the Australian Securities Exchange.

On 24 February 2023, Latitude announced it was ending its Buy now, pay later service in Australia and New Zealand, effective immediately.

On 27 March 2023, Latitude reported that it had a cyber breach involving almost 8 million of Australian and New Zealand drivers' licences, thousands of passport numbers, fewer than 100 monthly financial statements, and six million customer records provided before 2013.
