= In-house lending =

Type of seller financing

In house lending is a type of seller financing in which a company or broker will help a customer obtain a loan at their place of business to purchase a product or services. When using in-house lending, the seller does not have to rely on a third party company or business to complete the transaction.

In-house lending offers businesses the ability to act as direct lenders, bypassing traditional banks or financial institutions. This approach allows for more flexible loan terms and allows the seller to influence the sales process particularly for customers who may not qualify for conventional financing. Many industries, including real estate, automotive, and retail, utilize in-house lending to facilitate transactions. For example, car dealerships often provide financing directly to buyers through buy-here-pay-here (BHPH) programs, where payments are made directly to the dealer rather than a third-party lender. Similarly, real estate developers may offer seller-financed mortgages, enabling buyers to pay in installments directly to the seller.

== Usage ==
One of the primary advantages of in-house lending is that it provides businesses with greater control over loan approvals, interest rates, and repayment structures. However, this also comes with risks, such as increased financial exposure due to defaults. Moreover, regulatory requirements vary by jurisdiction, and businesses must comply with consumer protection laws to ensure transparency in lending practices. As financial technology advances, many companies are integrating automated credit assessments and digital loan processing to streamline in-house lending operations.

In the real estate industry most home builders will use an in-house lender and often offer buyer incentives by processing the loan through their own mortgage company. In-house mortgage companies are sometimes scrutinized by other mortgage companies because outside or 3rd party mortgage companies cannot compete with their internal market rates or discount lending incentives that the builder offers.

Consumers can typically apply for in-house loans by visiting the business which is typically a brick and mortar. One can ask for special financing with the sales representative and they will usually direct him to see their lending specialist. There are some in-house lenders that are able to originate the transaction on-line for on-line buy here pay here dealerships and websites. At times it can be a challenge to discover who is actually using in-house lending or if they are using a bank, credit union on the back end to finance the transaction.

In the new car auto industry you will often find a finance manager or lending team that is willing to help find a funding bank to extend credit. For some used car dealerships they will often resort to funding the transaction by using their own business capital and payment coupon booklet to help a buyer who may not qualify through a traditional bank or finance company.

== Around the world ==
=== Caribbean Context - Trinidad and Tobago ===
In the English speaking Caribbean there are variations on this. In Trinidad and Tobago for instance there may be advertisements for in-house lending but what it amounts to is a sales agency for an established lender such as a commercial bank or credit union. Because of strict debt service requirements the ability of most to qualify for mortgage or vehicle loans are restricted.

This has given rise to buyers of property asking for rent to own type arrangements. This approach does not afford the buyer with all the legal benefits and protections of a mortgage.

== See also ==
- 0% finance
- Buy now, pay later
- Car finance
- Mortgage
- Seller financing
