= ChargeAfter =

- Company type: Private
- Industry: Financial technology Point of sale financing Embedded lending
- Founded: 2017
- Founder: Meidad Sharon
- Headquarters: New York City, United States
- Key people: Meidad Sharon (Founder & CEO); Doron Abramovitch (CFO); Shlomi Kringel (COO); Gil Segev (CBO)
- Products: Embedded lending platform Embedded lending network The lending hub
- Number of employees: ~100
- Website: chargeafter.com

ChargeAfter is an American financial technology company that provides software for point-of-sale financing. The company operates in the United States, Canada, and Australia.

== History ==
ChargeAfter was founded in 2017 by Meidad Sharon, who serves as the company's CEO. In 2018, the company won the BBVA Open Talent "Fintech for People" award.

In May 2019, ChargeAfter raised $8 million in a Series A round led by Propel Venture Partners (the venture capital arm of BBVA), with participation from PICO Venture Partners, the Plug and Play accelerator, and Synchrony Financial. In February 2020, Visa Inc. made an investment in ChargeAfter and announced a partnership under which Visa's network of sellers, acquirers, and issuing banks would gain access to ChargeAfter platform.

In June 2020, MUFG Innovation Partners made an investment in ChargeAfter to support the platform's global expansion. In October 2021, Lenovo launched ChargeAfter's multi-lender financing platform on its U.S. website.

In March 2022, ChargeAfter raised $44 million in a Series B round led by The Phoenix, an Israeli financial services group, with participation from Citi Ventures (Citigroup), Banco Bradesco, MUFG, and existing investors. The round brought the company's total disclosed funding to $60 million.

In 2022, Raymour & Flanigan selected ChargeAfter to power its point-of-sale financing program. In August 2023, ChargeAfter expanded its lender network by adding Wells Fargo Retail Services, a division of Wells Fargo Bank, N.A.

In February 2024, Citi Retail Services selected ChargeAfter as the technology provider for its Citi Pay product family, including Citi Pay Credit (a digital-only credit card) and Citi Pay Installment Loan. In March 2024, the United States Patent and Trademark Office granted ChargeAfter a patent covering cross-service transaction facilitation technologies and dynamic transaction interfaces.

In July 2024, HP Inc. selected ChargeAfter's platform to add a consumer financing program on HP.com in the United States. In March 2025, Authority Brands chose ChargeAfter to launch BuyFin, its consumer financing platform. In 2026, ChargeAfter was included in Forbes’ list of America’s Best Startup Employers.

== Overview ==
The embedded lending platform is ChargeAfter's main platform for merchants. It provides software that connects a merchant's checkout environment to a network of pre-integrated lenders.

The lending hub is a white-label platform for banks and financial institutions, publicly launched in March 2024.
