= GE Capital =

Corporate division

- Formerly: General Electric Credit Corp. (Renamed in 1988)
- Type: Subsidiary
- Industry: Financial services
- Founded: 1932
- Defunct: March 31, 2024
- Fate: Dissolved
- Successor: GE Energy Financial Services; Synchrony Financial
- Headquarters: Norwalk, Connecticut, United States
- Area served: Worldwide
- Key people: Alec Burger (chairman and CEO)
- Parent: General Electric
- Website: www.gecapital.com

GE Capital was the financial services division of General Electric. Its various units were sold between 2013 and 2021, including the notable spin-off of the North American consumer finance division as Synchrony Financial. Ultimately, only one division of the company remained, GE Energy Financial Services, which was transferred to GE Vernova when General Electric was broken up.

== Overview ==
On July 8, 2013, the Financial Stability Oversight Council designated GE Capital as a "systemically important financial institution", which makes it subject to oversight by the Federal Reserve.

In 2014, GE Capital had 35,000+ employees worldwide, operating in more than 40 countries, with total assets of US$499 billion. It was rated AA+ with stable outlook by S&P in 2012.

GE Capital's subsidiaries also operated under the GE Money brand.

=== Restructuring plan ===
On April 10, 2015, Jeffrey R. Immelt, the CEO of General Electric, announced that GE would sell most of GE Capital over the next two years.

The following areas were sold:

- GE Capital Sponsor Finance was sold to Canada Pension Plan Investment Board and Sumitomo Mitsui Banking Corporation
- GE Capital Real Estate was sold to The Blackstone Group and Wells Fargo.
- The majority of GE Commercial Lending & Leasing was sold to Wells Fargo. Operations in Germany and France were sold to Crédit Mutuel. Operations in Australia were sold to Sankaty Advisors.
- Mubadala GE Capital, a joint venture with Mubadala Development Company, was sold to MidCap Financial, a portfolio company of Apollo Management.
- GE Capital Rail Services was sold to First Union Rail, a subsidiary of Wells Fargo, and Marmon Group
- GE Capital Bank was sold to Goldman Sachs.
- GE Healthcare Finance Services was sold to Capital One.
- GE Capital Equity was sold to Ardian.
- GE Capital Transportation Finance was sold to BMO Financial Group.
- GE Capital Corporate Finance ― Aircraft was sold to Global Jet Capital, a portfolio company of AE Industrial Partners, the Carlyle Group and GSO Capital Partners.
- GE Capital's Mexican equipment lending and leasing operations were sold to Linzor Capital Partners.
- GE Trailer Fleet Services was sold to Element Financial and Arval.
- GE Capital's Japanese capital finance, fleet service and vendor finance businesses were sold to Sumitomo Mitsui Financial Group
- GE Capital's American restaurant finance operations were sold to First Horizon National Corporation, Wintrust Financial and Sterling Bancorp. Its hotel franchise operations were sold to Western Alliance Bancorp.
- GE Capital Aviation Services (GECAS) was sold to AerCap in 2021.
- Electric Insurance Company was sold to RiverStone International in 2024.

== Former operations ==
=== Australia ===
In Australia, the GE Money brand encompassed the GE Consumer Finance and GE Capital Finance businesses. The company provided car, boat, personal and consolidation loans, credit cards, mortgages and insurance.

In May 2002, GE purchased the Australian Guarantee Corporation (AGC) business from Westpac, and as a result, AGC Automotive Finance became GE Automotive Finance (GE Auto), and former retail finance competitor, AGC Creditline, became known as GE CreditLine.

GE Consumer Finance controlled most credit cards and loans and has a strategic partnership with Coles Group to operate the Coles Group Source MasterCard. GE Consumer Finance governs the GE Creditline, GO MasterCard, gem Visa and Buyer's Edge cards which all offer interest-free terms at participating retailers.

GE Finance also had strategic financial relations with Myer, Australia's largest department store. In 2006 and 2007 Myer signed contracts with GE to issue and govern both the new Myer Card and the Myer Visa Card. GE was also the issuer of the old red ColesMyer card which is no longer an acceptable method of payment of Myer stores, this is following the decision of Myer being disenfranchised from the Coles Myer Group.

In 2004, GE Capital Finance purchased the Wizard Home Loans business.

On 24 October 2008, GE Money announced that it would cease offering motor finance in Australia and New Zealand. This move proved damaging to GE aligned dealerships who have been given 60 days to find an alternate financier to provide floorplan finance. GE Money also announced that it will be pulling out of the mortgage industry and no longer providing mortgages other than those sold under the Wizard Brand.

In December 2008, GE Money announced it was in advanced talks with the National Australia Bank to sell the Wizard brand. Ultimately, Wizard was bought by the Commonwealth Bank.

In 2015, GE Capital sold its Australian and New Zealand business to a consortium led by Deutsche Bank, KKR and Värde Partners. The business was renamed Latitude Financial Services with Sean Morrissey appointed as its new CEO.

=== Austria ===
Austria's GE Money (formerly GE Capital Bank) was founded in 1994 after the successful acquisition and merger of Mercurbank and AVABANK. Today, it is one of Austria's leading consumer and auto finance businesses and a market leader in retail sales financing. Based in Vienna, with a network of branches throughout the country, the business provides a variety of innovative financial services including auto lending, private lending, sales finance and third party personal lending. The primary focus is on consumers, customers and business partners, such as car dealers, retailers and loan brokers.

The Austrian division was purchased, along with the German, Finnish and British store card operations of GE Money, by the Santander Group in January 2009.

=== Canada ===
GE Money Canada provided private label credit card and MasterCard card programs to consumers and lending options for retailers in key industries across the country. GE Money-Canada also was a provider of alternative residential mortgages and patient financing through its CareCredit unit. It was part of the Synchrony Financial spinoff in 2014.

=== Czech Republic ===
GE Money Bank (formerly GE Capital Bank) was a significant institution in the Czech Republic. It was founded in 1997, after the acquisition of Agrobanka bank as GE Capital Bank. In the year 2000, it changed the name to GE Money Bank. It went through an IPO in 2016 and operates under the new name of MONETA Money Bank. It is a full-service bank with an extensive network of branches and ATMs. Its services focus both on retail clients and small and medium-sized enterprises. Its headquarters are located in Prague. Its call center operates from Ostrava.

=== Denmark ===
GE Money Bank Denmark (previously GE Capital Bank Denmark) offered credit cards, loans and other financial solutions. Brand names included Acceptcard, Morecard and E-lån. In 2014, GE Capital sold its Scandinavian operations to Santander.

=== France ===
GE Money Bank France is born from the acquisition by GE of Crédit de l'Est and SOVAC in 1995. It provides real-estate mortgages and auto loans. GE Capital sold GE Money Bank France to Cerberus Capital Management in 2016.

=== Hong Kong ===
GE Capital was incorporated as a Restricted License Bank in Hong Kong. Its major focus was in mortgages (homes and automobile) and personal loans. GE Capital sold its Hong Kong operations to Standard Chartered.

=== Hungary ===
Budapest Bank, was established in 1987 as one of the first commercial banks when the two-tier banking system was created in Hungary. Since 1995, GE (General Electric Company) as owner provided solid background for the bank. Budapest Bank offered a full range of financial and banking services for consumers and small and medium-sized businesses. Budapest Bank was sold to MFB in 2014.

=== India ===
GE had more than 118 branches in India as of July 2006. Most of these are in the southern states. There were branches in Coimbatore, Erode, Salem Saradha, Trichy, Madurai, Tanjore, Palaghat, Hyderabad, Trivandrum, Rajamundhry, Kakinada, Vizag, Vijaywada, Hubli, Dharwad and Belgaun. GE was the first BPO's in Hyderabad. GE Capital sold its Indian housing finance business to Magma Fincorp; in 2012, it sold the remains loan portfolio to clix capital, and exited the credit card joint venture SBI Card with State Bank of India, leaving SBI in place

=== Italy ===
In 2008, GE Capital acquired Interbanca, a merchant banking firm from Banco Santander, in exchange for GE Capital businesses in Germany, Finland, Austria, and the UK. In May 2015, GE appointed Deutsche Bank to sell the bank, then had a net assets of over €1,000,000,000. In 2016, Banca IFIS acquired Interbanca for €160 million, with an obligation to repay the inter-company debt to GE.

=== Ireland ===
GE Money Ireland was part of the European operations of GE Consumer Finance. In the Republic of Ireland, GE Money provided specialised financing and services such as leasing, hire purchase, mortgages and loans to businesses and individuals across the country. With headquarters in Dublin, GE Money serviced its customers through regional sales centres and a dealer and partner network. GE sold its Irish loan portfolio to Pepper Home Loans in 2012.

=== Latvia ===
GE Money Bank Latvia was a universal bank owned by GE in Latvia (merged from the former BTB bank and GE Money financial company), offering loan and deposit products to both private and legal entities. It was acquired by Otkritie FC Bank in 2011.

=== Japan ===
GE Consumer Finance Co., Ltd (Japanese: GEコンシューマー・ファイナンス株式会社, Hepburn: Jī Ī Konshūmā Fainansu Kabushikigaisha) is part of the Japanese operation of GE Consumer Finance. From April 2005, it began to provide GE Money brand in Japan. In 2008, GE was crowned In-House of the Year - Japan In-House Lawyer of the Year by the 2008 ALB Japan Law Awards. The Japanese operation was sold to Shinsei Bank in 2008.

=== Netherlands ===
GE Artesia Bank, a part of GE Capitals subsidiary GE Commercial Finance, offered banking services to High-net-worth individuals as well as corporates in the Netherlands. It provided capital finance, long-term finance, leasing and finance for specific international trade transactions. It closed in 2015.

=== New Zealand ===
In 2002, GE Finance purchased Australian Guarantee Corporation's New Zealand-based finance company to create the AGC Creditline Card (now GEM Visa Card), which provides financing for retailers. In 2006 GE Money New Zealand purchased Pacific Retail Finance (PRF), New Zealand's largest personal consumer finance company, and the mortgage assets of Superbank, a supermarket-based banking system.

On 24 October 2008, GE Money announced that it was pulling out of the New Zealand vehicle finance market, with the loss of 80 staff. It attributed this decision to the credit crunch.

On 15 December 2008, GE Money announced it would no longer be offering home loans through Wizard Home Loans and was seeking a buyer.

In 2015, GE Capital sold its Australian and New Zealand business to a consortium led by Deutsche Bank, Kohlberg Kravis Roberts, and Värde Partners.

=== Norway ===
GE Money Bank Norge was a division of the Stockholm-based Swedish subsidiary GE Capital AB. It was a leading provider of consumer finance products in Norway with more than 300,000 clients and total lending of NOK 5 billion, second only to the major domestic bank DnB NOR.

It was the second bank in Norway to offer US style credit cards with zero annual/monthly fee and including a grace period, after Bankia Bank ASA. In the eighteen months following the launch of GE MasterCard in June 2001, the market increased to more than 100,000 US style credit cards. Before these cards, Norwegian banks only offered annual fee cards or cards with no interest free grace period.

In 2014, GE Capital sold its Scandinavian operations to Santander.

=== Philippines ===
GE Money, in an effort to expand its presence in Southeast Asia, acquired a majority stake in the now-defunct Keppel-Monte Savings Bank which acquired what was formerly the Banco Monte De Piedad, the Philippines' first savings bank (and second bank after the commercial bank Banco Español-Filipino), established under the Spanish era. The acquisition was finalized on December 20, 2005 after the Monetary Board of the Bangko Sentral ng Pilipinas approved the purchase 12 days earlier. The bank was renamed GE Money Bank Philippines (GE Bank). It had 31 branches all over the Philippine archipelago and was ultimately acquired by BDO Unibank in 2009.

=== Poland ===
Polish GE Money Bank S.A. was primarily headquartered in Gdańsk prior to December 31, 2009. BPH SA (Bank Przemysłowo-Handlowy) is a Polish financial institution 89% owned by GE Money Bank (prior to 2008 the largest shareholder was UniCredit), employing about 10,000 people. On 31 December 2009, Bank BPH merged with GE Money Bank Polska. After the merging of the two brands, GE's Capital's Polish headquarters are located in three cities: Warsaw, Kraków and Gdańsk. In October 2014, the bank's owner, General Electric, revealed it was considering selling the firm. In November 2016, GE completed the spin-off and merger of Bank BPH's Core Bank to Alior Bank. GE Capital retained the Bank BPH legal entity, including its mortgage business.

=== Romania ===
In Romania GE Capital has two subsidiaries:

- GE Money, a personal finance and leasing company.
- GE Garanti Bank, a bank detained by GE Capital in a joint venture with Garanti Bank International from Turkey. GE Garanti is located in Bucharest.

GE Capital sold its Romanian operations to Garanti Bank in 2010.

=== Russia ===
Russian GE Money Bank Russia was located in Moscow. It was sold to Sovcombank in 2013.

=== Sweden ===
The Swedish subsidiary was GE Capital Bank AB. Based in Stockholm, the bank traded as GE Money Bank. In 2014, GE Capital sold its Scandinavian operations to Santander.

=== Switzerland ===
GE Money Bank was the largest provider of small consumer credits in Switzerland. In 2006, the company partnered with Migros, allowing them to offer credit cards contracts through Migros. The Bank is now Cembra Money Bank and went public through an initial public offering (IPO) in 2013.

=== United Kingdom ===
In the United Kingdom, GE Money provided mortgages and secured loans through the former First National, acquired from Abbey National, and offered these through intermediaries. On 25 September 2008, it was announced that the UK Financial Services Authority had fined GE Money Home Lending £1.1 million for failings in its systems, which caused it to overcharge borrowers. It was announced on 29 March 2008 that the GE Capital Bank store cards business and managed credit card business had been acquired by the Santander Group. In 2015, GE sold its mortgage loans in sales to Kensington Mortgage (controlled by Blackstone and TPG) and to funds managed by Blackstone, TPG and CarVal Investors. Afterwards, the company ceased taking new loans.

=== United States ===
Before June 2, 2014, GE Capital Bank was made up of retail and commercial banks. The company was founded in 1988 and is based in Draper, Utah. GE Capital Retail Bank provided retail banking and credit services to consumers in the United States and internationally. It offered retail sales finance, such as private label credit card programs, installment lending, bankcards, and financial services for consumers. The company also provided retail consumer financing solutions, such as private label credit cards, dual card, flex loans, and all-tender loyalty and gift cards; It offered its products and services through dealers, retailers, associations, contractors, manufacturers, healthcare practices, and service providers. The company was formerly known as GE Money Bank and changed its name to GE Capital Retail Bank in October 2011. GE Capital Retail Bank operated as a subsidiary of General Electric Capital Corporation.

GE Capital Retail Bank acquired MetLife Bank from MetLife in 2011.

As of June 2, 2014, GE Capital Retail Bank is now known as Synchrony Bank. GE Capital provided credit services solely to businesses and merchants in the United States, and acts as a multi-product commercial finance bank, and used deposit accounts to fund commercial loans and leases. The company served various industries, such as automotive, consumer electronics, flooring, healthcare, home furnishings and improvement, HVAC, elective health care, jewelry, landscaping and irrigation, luxury goods, marine, music, outdoor power equipment, pool and spa, power sports, recreation vehicle, sewing, sporting goods, travel, vacuum, and water treatment industries. GE Capital Bank was a member of the Federal Deposit Insurance Corporation (FDIC). GE Capital Bank was sold to Goldman Sachs in 2016.

GE Capital owned WMC Mortgage from 2004 to 2007. The company briefly owned Kidder, Peabody & Company from 1986 until its sale to PaineWebber in 1994.

GE Capital group also had its hand in broadcasting throughout the early 1990s to own radio and television stations. The company first purchased Pegasus Broadcasting, who owns three television stations WJBF-TV, WAPA-TV and KSCH-TV in 1990. The company next purchased CBS affiliate WCSC-TV in 1991, and radio stations KMOW-AM and KEYI-FM in Austin later that year.

GE Capital sold off its broadcasting assets in stages, starting with the sale of radio stations in Austin to Mercury Broadcasting in 1991, then the sale of WJBF-TV to Spartan Communications in 1992, followed by the sales of WCSC-TV to Jefferson-Pilot Communications in 1993 and KSCH-TV to Wing Fat, through a group Channel 58 Inc. in 1994 Five years later WAPA-TV was sold to LIN Television Corporation in 1999.

== Legal issues ==
In April 1997, a lawsuit against General Electric Capital Corp was filed on behalf of the company's customers who filed for bankruptcy. The GE Capital Corp. was accused of unfair debt collection practices. The class action lawsuit resulted in $100 million settlement with over 100,000 class members from 50 states. Plaintiffs claimed that the company solicited agreements from bankrupt debtors to repay their credit card debts but failed to notify bankruptcy court of the agreement. Those reaffirmation agreements legally required the debtors to continue paying off their debt in exchange for keeping the credit card, even though bankruptcy erases credit card debts. The lawsuit claimed that GE Capital was required by law to file the agreements with bankruptcy courts and did not do so. As part of the settlement, the company agreed to refund, with interest, all credit card payments made after debtors entered into the reaffirmation agreements between January 1, 1993, and June 30, 1997. GE Capital Corp. also promised to advise credit bureaus to correct any negative credit reports related to class members’ failure to repay reaffirmed debt.

In June 2014, Synchrony Bank, formerly GE Capital Retail Bank, agreed to settle claims of illegal credit card practices that were filed by the federal Consumer Financial Protection Bureau and the United States Justice Department by agreeing to pay $225 million to Spanish speaking consumers that were harmed by discriminatory practices and deceptive marketing. The bank was also required to pay an additional $3.5 million in civil penalties to the CFPB's Civil Penalty Fund for deceptive credit card marketing.

== Divestment ==
On March 13, 2014, GE Capital announced that it would spin its North American consumer finance division off under the new name Synchrony Financial through an initial public offering (IPO). On July 31, 2014, Synchrony Financial raised $2.9 billion in its IPO when GE sold 125 million shares (15%) of the company.

On April 10, 2015 GE announced it would sell most of GE Capital's commercial and consumer businesses within two years, focusing instead on its leasing businesses connected with GE's manufacturing businesses. The company reached an agreement to sell the majority of its property business to Wells Fargo and Blackstone, valued at $26.5 billion. GE Chairman and CEO, Jeff Immelt, announced the plan in a letter to shareholders. It is "a big change for GE," but he said it is "right for the company." Under the plan, Immelt said that GE expects more than 90% of its earnings will be generated by its industrial businesses by 2018, up from 58% in 2014. GE Capital, meanwhile, will make up 10% of the company's revenues by 2018, down from 46% in 2001.

In June 2015, the Canada Pension Plan Investment Board announced it would acquire GE Capital's private equity lending portfolio for $12 billion.
