= Ahmed Fahour =

Lebanese Australian businessman

Ahmed Fahour AO
- أحمد فاعور
- Born: 1966 (age 59–60); Lebanon
- Citizenship: Australian
- Education: St Joseph's College; Redden College; La Trobe University; Melbourne Business School
- Occupations: CEO Gurner Group; Former CEO Latitude Financial Services and Australia Post
- Spouse: Hannah Fahour
- Children: 4

Ahmed Fahour (Arabic: أحمد فاعور ; born 1966) is a Lebanese Australian businessman. He is CEO of Gurner Group, and formerly the managing director (MD) and CEO of Latitude Financial Services, MD and CEO of Australia Post, and CEO Australia of the National Australia Bank (NAB).

== Early life and career ==
Fahour was born in Lebanon in 1966 and migrated to Australia with his parents, Abdel and Siham, in 1969. His parents became successful businesspeople in Australia and have eight children. He grew up in the Melbourne suburb of Carlton before moving to Preston at 14. Despite growing up in a Muslim family he was sent to Catholic schools, with his father emphasising to him that good things could be learned from all religions.

He studied at St Joseph's College in North Fitzroy and later attended Redden College in Preston. In 1987, he graduated from La Trobe University in Melbourne with a bachelor of economics. He went on to complete a Master of Business Administration at Melbourne Business School in 1993 while working for Boston Consulting Group. He became a director of the group in 1997, and spent a year as co-managing director of its joint-venture investment company, Iformation.

Fahour joined NAB in September 2004 as CEO Australia, and became an executive member of the board. In February 2009, he stepped down from the principal board and group executive committee. Fahour has held directorships of Nasdaq Dubai, Rip Curl and has been a trustee of the Melbourne Cricket Ground. He was the interim CEO of the Australian Business Investment Partnership.

== Australia Post ==
In December 2009, Fahour was announced as the new MD and CEO of Australia Post (a federal government-owned business), commencing in February 2010. There, he commenced a business renewal program, called "Future Ready".

Under Fahour's direction, Australia Post had two consecutive years of profit growth (in FY2011 and FY2012) following steep profit declines in the preceding two years (FY2009 and FY2010), as Australian letter volumes started to decline. Further letter volume decline led to reduced profits in FY2013 and FY2014, with repeated calls from Fahour for the government to support fundamental reform of the letter service to prevent Australia Post incurring future losses.

In March 2012, Fahour announced plans to create the "Australia Post Digital MailBox", as part of the postal corporation's strategy "to build a sustainable communications business, both physically and digitally". The Digital MailBox was given a soft launch at Parliament House, Canberra, in October 2012 and it was officially opened to Australian consumers for the first time in May 2013.

In June 2014, Fahour was widely criticised for his $4.8 million salary, whilst sacking 900 staff. He was once Australia's highest-paid public servant, receiving a total salary package of $5.6 million (including a $1.2 million bonus) in 2016.

Under Fahour's leadership, in 2015 Australia Post recorded its first full-year loss in over 30 years, with half-year profits down some 56 percent.

In February 2017, Australian Prime Minister Malcolm Turnbull criticised Fahour's $5.6 million salary saying, "As the Prime Minister and a taxpayer, I've spoken to the chairman today. I think that salary, that remuneration, is too high." On 23 February, Australia Post announced that Fahour has resigned as MD and CEO of Australia Post, and would step down from the role in July 2017.

Upon resigning from CEO of Australia Post, in July 2017 Fahour joined BCG Digital Ventures as non-executive chairman for Asia-Pacific.

== Later career ==
In 2011, Fahour was appointed the Australian Government's special envoy to the Organisation of Islamic Cooperation.

In 2014, Fahour was appointed chairman of Pro-Pac Packaging Group (PPG). The same year he was appointed an adjunct professor at La Trobe Business School and became a fellow of the Australian Institute of Company Directors. In 2017 Fahour was appointed an Officer of the Order of Australia for distinguished service to business, particularly in the area of postal communications, to the banking and investment sectors, and as a supporter of improved multicultural relations.

In October 2018, Fahour was appointed MD and CEO of Latitude Financial Services.

== Views on extremism ==
Fahour says the best way to counter Islamic extremism is to give Muslim young people jobs and opportunities. He says that extremists misinterpret Islamic teachings such as the Quranic injunction, 'whoever kills an innocent person, it's as if he has killed all of mankind'.

== Personal life ==
From 2013 until 2021, Fahour lived in Invergrowrie, a heritage-listed Victorian Picturesque Gothic house located in Hawthorn in Melbourne's inner east. Fahour purchased the house from Globe International co-founder Peter Hill for $20 million; and sold it for $40 million. The house was built from the 1850s for Sir James Palmer, the first Speaker of the Victorian Legislative Council and was later owned by the comic and entrepreneur George Coppin, and Sir William McPherson, a Premier of Victoria, before being gifted to the Headmistresses' Association for education purposes.

Fahour and his family have made significant financial contributions to the Islamic Museum of Australia, the founder and director of which is his brother, Moustafa Fahour, a former Macquarie Bank executive. His sister, MasterChef participant Samira El Khafir, is the head chef and manages the cafe on site. Moustafa's wife, Maysaa, is the chairwoman and director.

He was part of the board at Methodist Ladies College in 2012, who made headlines for controversially sacking its principal Rosa Storelli.

Fahour is married to Hannah and has four children with his former wife Dionnie. He has four brothers and three sisters.
