= GE Commercial Finance =

- Type: Division of GE Capital
- Industry: Financial
- Defunct: November 18, 2008
- Fate: Merged into GE Capital
- Headquarters: Norwalk, Connecticut, United States
- Total assets: US$335 billion (2007)
- Subsidiaries: Banque Artesia Nederland N.V. (GE Artesia Bank)

GE Commercial Finance was a unit of GE Capital, (one of five major operating divisions of General Electric). Headquartered in Norwalk, Connecticut, United States, it played a role in over 35 countries and had assets of over US$335 billion at year end 2007.

As part of GE Capital, it offered products such as revolving lines of credit, floorplan finance, equipment leasing of various forms, real estate services, and car fleet management. The industries served include healthcare, manufacturing, fleet management, communications, construction, energy, aviation, infrastructure and equipment, as well as many others. Operations of GE Commercial Finance were eventually merged directly into GE Capital.

GE Commercial Finance acquired the Dutch financial institution Banque Artesia Nederland N.V. in December 2006 which then traded under the name GE Artesia Bank.
