= SBI Card =

Indian Credit card provider India

SBI Cards And Payment Services Limited
- Type: Public
- Traded as: NSE: SBICARD; BSE: 543066
- Industry: Financial services
- Founded: May 1998; 28 years ago
- Founder: State Bank of India and GE Capital
- Headquarters: Gurugram, Haryana, India
- Area served: India
- Key people: Salila Pande (MD & CEO); Challa Sreenivasulu Setty (Chairman)
- Products: Credit Card
- Services: Credit Cards; Payments
- Website: www.sbicard.com

SBI Card (legally SBI Cards and Payment Services Limited) is an Indian non-banking financial company which provides credit card issuance and related payment services, operating as a subsidiary of the State Bank of India. The company was Incorporated in 1998, as a joint venture between SBI and GE Capital. The company is headquartered in Gurugram.

== History ==
SBI Card was started in 1998 as a joint venture between the State Bank of India and GE Capital. The company reached one million cards in 2002 and two million cards by 2005. In 2020 SBI Card completed Initial Public Offering, becoming the first credit card company to be listed in Indian stock market. As of September 2025, SBI Card has over 20 million cards.
