= WMC Mortgage =

American mortgage company, 1955 to 2007

- Formerly: Pacific Western Mortgage Company, Weyerhaeuser Mortgage Company, Western Asset Mortgage Capital Corporation
- Type: Subsidiary
- Industry: Financial services
- Founded: 1955; 71 years ago
- Defunct: 2007
- Fate: Collapsed during the subprime mortgage crisis
- Headquarters: Woodland Hills, Los Angeles, United States
- Products: Subprime mortgages
- Owner: GE Money
- Website: www.wmcmortgage.com

WMC Mortgage (also known as WMC Direct), was an American mortgage company based in Woodland Hills, California that focused on wholesale originator of subprime residential mortgages. It went into bankruptcy in 2007.

== History ==
WMC Mortgage was founded in 1955 as Pacific Western Mortgage Company. It went through several mergers and became known as Weyerhaeuser Mortgage Company (owned by US timber company Weyerhaeuser).

In the late 1990s it was sold to private equity firm Apollo Global Management, and entered the subprime mortgage lending business. In 2004, GE Money (formerly GE Consumer Finance), owned by General Electric, bought WMC Mortgage for about $500 million.

WMC Mortgage catered to consumers with less than perfect borrower profiles. The company was among the largest subprime lenders in the United States, ranking seventh in 2005 and fifth in 2006 in the dollar volume of subprime mortgage originations.

GE ceased WMC's operations in late 2007 due to the subprime market collapse. GE's WMC Mortgage unit filed for Chapter 11 bankruptcy.
