= Seller financing =

Loan provided by the seller

Seller financing is a loan provided by the seller of a property or business to the purchaser. When used in the context of residential real estate, it is also called "bond-for-title" or "owner financing." Usually, the purchaser will make some sort of down payment to the seller, and then make installment payments (usually on a monthly basis) over a specified time, at an agreed-upon interest rate, until the loan is fully repaid. In layman's terms, this is when the seller in a transaction offers the buyer a loan rather than the buyer obtaining one from a bank. To a seller, this is an investment in which the return is guaranteed only by the buyer's credit-worthiness or ability and motivation to pay the mortgage. For a buyer it is often beneficial, because he/she may not be able to obtain a loan from a bank. In general, the loan is secured by the property being sold. In the event that the buyer defaults, the property is repossessed or foreclosed on exactly as it would be by a bank.

There are no universal requirements mandated for seller financing. In order to protect both the buyer's and seller's interests, a legally-binding purchase agreement should be drawn up with the assistance of an attorney and then signed by both parties.

== Secondary market ==
There is a secondary market for seller-financed debt instruments. Many companies and investors look to purchase properly-structured debt instruments as investments. The criteria for a typical, properly structure seller-financed debt instrument would consist of an asset with a good collateralized equity position, an interest rate that is not underperforming the current rate environment, with a satisfactory borrower background in financial terms.

== Seller financing in housing ==
In the United States, seller financing has emerged as a way for people with poor credit a path toward home ownership following stricter regulations placed on mortgage lending following the subprime crisis of 2008. Unlike a regular mortgage, in which the buyer gets the legal title to the house, the buyer in seller financing does not receive the legal title until they have fully paid off the purchase price of the house. This means that if a buyer misses a payment, they can be evicted and lose all money and interest put into the house. In addition, the buyer is often responsible for repairs, taxes and insurance, meaning that they have the responsibilities of being a homeowner without the rights of actually owning the property. Seller financing contracts are subject to fewer consumer protections than mortgage loans in most states.

While seller financing can provide a unique way for people with low credit scores to obtain a path to home ownership, they are considered predatory by groups such as the Center for American Progress. In addition, some investment firms have shied away from getting involved with seller financing out of fear for their reputations. A 2012 study of seller financing contracts in Maverick County, Texas found that less than 20% of people who signed such a contract ever came to fully own the home. To combat the concern for predatory lending practices, the legislative and executive branches of the United States government passed the Dodd–Frank Wall Street Reform and Consumer Protection Act and signed it into law in 2010, which contained within this legislation, a set of rules called the Loan Originator Rules. There is a portion of those aforementioned rules that regulates the creation of consumer mortgage loans under a seller-financed transaction that prohibits the use of predatory tactics.

== Benefits ==
Seller/buyer benefits:

- Both the buyer and the seller can make substantial savings in closing costs.
- They can negotiate interest rate, repayment schedule, and other conditions of the loan.
- The buyer can request special conditions for the purchase, such as inclusion of household appliances.
- The borrower does not have to qualify with a loan underwriter.
- There are no PMI insurance premiums unless negotiated.
- The seller can receive a higher yield on his/her investment by receiving equity with interest.
- The seller could negotiate a higher interest rate.
- The seller could negotiate a higher selling price.
- The property could be sold "as is" so there will be no need for repairs.
- The seller could choose which security documents (mortgage, deed of trust, land sales document, etc.) to best secure his/her interest until the loan is paid.
- If the property sells for a substantial profit, the seller can spread the resulting capital gain over multiple years, usually reducing the overall tax burden by turning the transaction into an installment sale.

== Drawbacks ==
- The buyer could pay the loan in full but still not receive title due to other encumbrances not divulged by, or unknown to the seller.
- The buyer could make payments faithfully, but the seller might not make payments on any senior financing that may be in place, thus subjecting the property to foreclosure.
- The buyer might not have the protection of a home inspection, mortgage insurance, or an appraisal to ensure that he/she is not paying too much for the property.
- The seller might not get the buyer’s full credit or employment picture, which could make foreclosure more likely.
- Depending upon the security instrument that was used, foreclosure could take up to a year.
- The seller could consent to a small down payment from the buyer, who could then abandon the property because they had minimal investment in the property.

== See also ==
- Hire purchase / installment plan
- In-house lending
- Leasing
- Rent to own
- Closed-end leasing
- Mortgage
