= Samaritan Catholic College =

Location
- Preston, Victoria; Australia; 37°44′39″S 145°0′17″E

Information
- Type: Independent all-male secondary
- Established: January 2000
- Founder: Marist Brothers
- Status: closed
- Closed: January 2009
- Headmaster: Mark Sheehan
- Grades: Years 7 to 12
- Enrolment: c.500
- Affiliations: Roman Catholic, Marist Brothers

Samaritan Catholic College was a Roman Catholic boys' high school, located in Preston, Melbourne, Australia. The College was a school founded and run in the tradition of the Marist Brothers and their founder, Saint Marcellin Champagnat.

Samaritan was established in 2000, as an amalgamation of two former Marist Colleges: St. Joseph's in Fitzroy North, and Redden Catholic College, which was located on the site now used by the Parade College Preston Campus. Samaritan College was a member of the Associated Catholic Colleges.

In January 2009, Samaritan Catholic College ceased to be a school in its own right due to declining numbers. Parade College now uses the site as its Preston Campus.

== History ==
=== St. Joseph's College, East Brunswick and Fitzroy North ===
The earliest founding school of Samaritan College, St. Joseph's Marist Brothers College in East Brunswick, was established by four Marist brothers in 1930, with a starting class of one hundred and fifty boys. The school was forced to move in 1938 when the State Electricity Commission of Victoria took over the site through compulsory acquisition for a terminal sub-station. The staff and students of St. Joseph's resumed their classes at a new site, at 100 Barkly Street in Fitzroy North.

=== Immaculate Heart College / Redden Catholic College ===
In 1914, the first parish priest of Preston, James O'Grady, bought 5.5 acres (22,000 m^{2}) of land and about eight houses in Clifton Grove. The Marist Brothers agreed to a request from the Archdiocese of Melbourne to build an Archdiocesan Junior Technical School on this site. However, the Second World War delayed planning for the new school, which did not eventuate until the mid-1950s.

The resulting school on the Preston site, Immaculate Heart College, opened its doors for the first time on 5 February 1957. The new College began with a staff of five Marist Brothers and two lay teachers. There were 466 boys in Years 5 to 8. Class sizes ranged from 59 to 74 students. Immaculate Heart College was blessed and officially opened by Archbishop Justin Simonds on 17 March 1957. In 1979, a separately run senior school was opened in Preston, which was named Redden College. This catered for year 11 and 12 boys from both Immaculate Heart and St Joseph's. In 1980, Greg Coffey was appointed the first lay principal of the College. Greg Coffey pleaded guilty to indecently assaulting two students while at Immaculate Heart College.

== Samaritan Catholic College ==
In August 1998, it was announced that Redden College and St. Joseph's at Fitzroy North were to amalgamate and become one College, to be called Samaritan Catholic College. Declining enrolments at both schools, influenced by the movement of families with school-age boys to the outer suburbs of Melbourne, was a major factor in this decision.

The new College opened in January 2000 at the Preston site of Redden College. A campus for Year 9 students was maintained at the old Fitzroy North site, but this program has since been discontinued. Since the amalgamation in January 2000 the college has spent $3.5 million on building and refurbishment, including the installation of a lift ($350,000) and the construction of a Multipurpose Centre ($500,000).

Br. Tony Paterson FMS was appointed the first principal of the new College, and was succeeded by Mark Sheehan in 2005.

== Notable alumni ==
- Paul Licuria, footballer
- Bert Newton, TV personality
- Vince Colosimo, actor
- Ahmed Fahour, CEO of Australia Post
- Archimede Fusillo, novelist
- Simon Colosimo, soccer player
- Kevin Hall, footballer
- Adnan Seoud, Brain Surgeon
- Daniel Morandin, Pan-Pacific Brazilian Jiu Jitsu Champion
