= Australian Guarantee Corporation =

Australian financial company

Australian Guarantee Corporation Limited
- Type: No longer trading
- Industry: Finance
- Founded: 1925
- Fate: Acquired
- Successor: GE Money and Westpac
- Headquarters: Sydney, Australia
- Products: Personal Finance; Business Finance; Retail Finance; Dealer Motor Vehicle Finance; Investments; Line of Credit; Insurance

Founded in 1921 as Australian Guarantee Company to initially provide finance for purchasers of smaller household items, it progressed into financing motor vehicles and was renamed as Australian Guarantee Corporation (AGC) in 1925. AGC was Australia's oldest national finance company offering a range of finance, investment and insurance products and were market leaders in equipment finance, cashflow finance, motor vehicle and personal finance.

== History ==
=== Origins ===
AGC was registered as a public company on 18 June 1925 and listed on the stock exchange in 1928. Its business specialised in lending for cars and farm machinery and later expanded into personal loans and lending for non-farm business equipment. Most of the funding for AGC's loans came from issuing debentures to the public, offering attractive interest rates. The first Managing Director was Mr G K Bain who assumed control from the company commencement until his retirement in 1956.

Having a strong association with Ford Motor Company, which had just opened an Australian office and was establishing a dealer network, AGC incorporated Traders Finance Corporation (TFC) on 10 July 1925 to provide financing exclusively for the Ford dealer sales network. TFC was wound down in the late-1970s although AGC continued to maintain a large percentage of Ford dealers business.

Transport and General Insurance Insurance Company Ltd was formed in 1938 as a wholly owned subsidiary of AGC to provide insurance facilities for purchasers of vehicles from the motor dealer network, and for general insurance needs of the affiliated motor dealers. The name was changed to AGC (Insurances) Ltd in the mid 1970s to better identify with the AGC products. The business was sold to AMP Society in 1989 and operated as AMP United Insurances Ltd.

In 1957 the Bank of New South Wales (later called the Wales, the forerunner of today's Westpac) bought 40% of AGC and over the years progressively increased its interest to a majority stake of 76% and then acquired all remaining shares in 1988. Banking regulations at the time prevented banks from doing the sort of lending finance companies like AGC did, but buying a finance company let the banks get around that. All the major Australian banks ended up with finance company subsidiaries doing riskier lending than the banks themselves would. The Wales let AGC run as an independent business, and that included giving no guarantees on the debentures issued by AGC.

=== Local Expansion ===
Initially AGC operated through head office in Sydney, with state operations in each capital city. The first regional branch presence was established in Toowoomba in 1958 under the management of Keith Jack who would later become the Managing Director in 1980.

Further branch expansion quickly followed in all states and by the mid-1970s AGC operated more than 100 branch offices with over 3,000 staff. With advancing technology in the mid-1980s most suburban and regional branches were closed and the business operations were again centralised in large state operations, servicing clients statewide by local resident sales staff or electronically from state centres.

=== Offshore Expansion ===
AGC's first offshore operation was New Zealand which operated relatively autonomously as AGC (New Zealand) Ltd from 1938. Papua New Guinea was established in 1958. The 1960s saw AGC move into South East Asia with Singapore, Malaysia and Brunei all opened as joint ventures with Standard Chartered Bank of England.

By the mid-1980s AGC had extended its overseas presence, generally with a local joint partner, into countries such as Thailand, Hong Kong, Taiwan, Solomon Islands, Fiji, Portugal and a joint office with Westpac in London. Overall, by 1988 the very successful overseas operations involved 12 countries and employed more than 1,000 staff.

Although most overseas businesses were very profitable, all were progressively sold in the early-1990s as part of the business rationalisation after the financial crisis of the late-1980s.

=== 1970s and 1980s ===
Through the 1970s AGC expanded and increased profits. It avoided many of the disasters that befell others in that time, though it did indulge in the diversification strategies that were in vogue, ending up for a time with a majority interest in Budget Rent a Car and in property developer Mirvac, plus minority interests in all sorts of things from entertainment business ("AGC Paradine" in partnership with well-known entertainment personality David Frost), winemaking, brickworks to caravans. On the finance related side AGC continued to expand overseas, and in Australia acquired Bill Acceptance Corporation (BAC) in 1977 (which it ran as an independent business). In the early-1980s AGC also acquired a number of competitor retail financier companies, notably General Credits, Standard Chartered Finance Australia, Associated Midland and Amev-UDC. From the late-1970s until 1988 AGC also operated a "big ticket" corporate financing business as AGC Corporate Finance, providing finance facilities for such purposes as commercial aircraft, public company preference shares and mining equipment. This operation was moved to Westpac Corporate Finance control in 1988.

In general, lending through those years was conservative and risk was tightly controlled. Lending against real estate in particular was capped at 30% of the loan book and spread by type and geography. The head office in Sydney at the time was devoid of luxuries, in a way reflecting in its environment the discipline applied to the business.

One property position that did spiral away in that time though was the Kooralbyn resort development started by prominent businessmen Peter Abeles and Arthur George in 1975. They put up $2m and AGC put up $4m, but costs increased and after advancing $12m AGC took it over. AGC then spent yet more over subsequent years until finally exiting in 1987 for a loss of some $50m. The motto within AGC that "the first loss is the best loss" had been illustrated, but the experience didn't keep it out of much worse property forays like the Como development in later years.

=== The 1990s and beyond ===
In the late-1980s and early-1990s, AGC found itself in severe difficulties having deviated from the traditional conservative lending policies towards "big ticket" property development loans. The economy turned against these borrowers, leaving AGC, and many similar financiers, with very substantial impaired loans and a consequent serious funding crisis. Westpac, although suffering similar situations with defaulting loans, agreed to support AGC through the provision of substantial funding lines. The ensuing period from 1991 onwards saw a complete restructure of the management operations and policies including exit from most property lending, sale of offshore subsidiaries (excluding AGC New Zealand), and updated lending policies. These actions resulted in a strong return to the traditional "mainstream" profitable performance by the mid-1990s.

== History of Chief Executives ==
Name	Years
George Keith Bain	1925 - 1956
Gordon Wallace Kennedy	1957 - 1960
Geoffrey Lakin Carter	1960 - 1976
Kenneth J Lambeth	1976 - 1980
Keith M Jack	1980 - 1982
Donald S Webb	1982 - 1983
Robert Alick Robson	1983 - 1989
Peter Wilson *	1989 - 1991
Barry Robertson *	1991 - 1992
Tony Aveling *	1992 - 1995
Richard Thomas *	1995 - 1998
John Malouf	1998 - 2001

     * Indicates Westpac Officer Appointment

== Types of Finance Products Offered ==
=== Personal Finance ===
==== AGC CreditLine ====
AGC Creditline Card Design

A retail finance card, which allowed the cardholder to make a purchase with extended interest-free and deferred payment options, allowing them to get what they want today, and pay it off before the promotion ends and not pay a cent in interest. The downside to this product for the consumer, is if they failed to repay the balance of a particular interest free plan, it would revert to a high interest rate. These cards could also be used through EFTPOS and ATM terminals, but these would automatically bear high interest. The card has since been superseded by GE CreditLine.

==== Personal Line of Credit ====
Provided a line of credit up to $15,000. Enabled customers to obtain home improvements, motor vehicles, debt consolidation or use the line of credit for any other worthwhile purpose. Cash advances were also available under this product allowing a borrower to take their line of credit up to their limit.

==== Mortgage Line of Credit ====
Provided a line of credit secured by a mortgage, over residential real estate for amounts over $20,000. Maximum amount that could be lent to a customer could be up to 90% of their property's value. This type of credit facility is secured by a first or second mortgage.

=== Business Finance ===
==== Chattel Financing ====
Providing funding to businesses for the acquisition of business-related assets such as motor vehicles and trucks, earth moving equipment etc. by way of purchase funding or leasing.

==== Cashflow Funding ====
Providing funding to businesses for cashflow purposes, as an alternative to traditional banking overdraft or term loans. Facilities were usually secured by the business assets such as stock and debtors.

=== Dealer Finance ===
==== Motor Financing ====
Providing funding to motor dealer clients for the purchase of motor vehicles from the dealership.

==== Dealer Funding ====
Providing funding to motor dealers for carrying floor plan of motor vehicle stock, or loans to dealers for the establishment and expansion of dealer businesses.

== GE Acquisition ==
On 26 November 2001, it was announced that GE Money had made an unsolicited approach to the Westpac Banking Corporation regarding the possible sale of the Personal Finance and Motor Dealer finance parts of AGC's business in Australia and New Zealand. This was completed in June 2002 at a reported price of $1.7b and from that point GE started integrating the AGC businesses into the GE Consumer Finance Australian arm. The personal finance segment of the business included the Credit Line product which had commenced business in 1968 as AGC Household Finance, and moved to the Credit Line product in 1984.

== Westpac Integration ==
With the GE acquisition of the retail and dealer lending segments of the AGC portfolio, Westpac integrated the Business Finance segments in Australia and New Zealand into its own operations under the banner of "Westpac Equipment Finance".

== Notes and references ==
- Westpac: The Bank that Broke the Bank, Edna Carew, Doubleday, 1997, paperback ISBN 0-86824-664-6.
