= Bankruptcy petition preparer =

A bankruptcy petition preparer is a person who is not an attorney or an employee of an attorneys who prepares a document for filing in the United States Bankruptcy Court for another person. Bankruptcy petition preparers are authorized in the bankruptcy code under 11 U.S.C. §110, but are limited in the services that they provide direct to the consumer.

Prior to 1994, bankruptcy petition preparers generally referred to themselves as "independent paralegals", "legal document preparers". "legal document technicians", "legal scrivener", and other titles. However, the Bankruptcy Reform Act of 1994 prohibited bankruptcy petition preparers from using the word "legal" in any way.

Bankruptcy petitioners are generally less expensive than bankruptcy attorneys. However, articles by attorneys often argue that bankruptcy petition preparers are harmful to consumers because of their lack of legal training.

Except for Arizona, there is currently no licensing requirements for bankruptcy petition preparers. There are also no educational or experience requirements associated with being a bankruptcy petition preparer. They are, however, regulated by the United States Trustee or Bankruptcy Administrator in the district which the case is filed. United States Trustees and Bankruptcy Administrators may investigate and bring motions against petition preparers that they believe are engaged in wrongdoing or have complaints filed against them. There are harsh monetary penalties and sanctions for petition preparers who are found to have engaged in unlawful or dishonest conduct.

Bankruptcy petition preparers must:

- Sign their name and print their address and Social Security Number on several places on the bankruptcy documents;
- Provide several notices to the debtor; and,
- Provide a copy of the petition to the debtor.

Bankruptcy petition preparers cannot:

- Provide any legal advice;
- Handle the court filing fee.
