= Reaffirmation agreement =

Aspect of US bankruptcy law

A reaffirmation agreement in United States bankruptcy law refers to an agreement made between a creditor and the debtor that waives discharge of a debt that would otherwise be discharged in the pending bankruptcy proceeding. A properly executed, timely filed reaffirmation agreement modifies the discharge such that it is rendered inoperable against the subject debt. Most statutory authority for reaffirmation agreements is codified at 11 U.S.C. § 524(c).

== Overview ==
A debtor may wish to pay a debt, even though that debt would be discharged in bankruptcy. For example, a debtor may wish to keep a vehicle. As a promise to pay that debt, a debtor must enter into a reaffirmation agreement with the creditor. Reaffirmations are voluntary and not required by law. It is recommended that the debtor carefully consider whether or not the agreed upon payments can be made before entering into a reaffirmation agreement. If a debtor is not delinquent on payments and chooses not to sign a reaffirmation agreement, many lenders will recognize the option to retain and pay the debt by continuing the regular monthly payments. However, this option is not recognized by all lenders, so it is important to know the lender's stance on reaffirming debt versus the retain and pay option.

Any agreement to reaffirm must be made before the discharge is entered. If you are in the process of reaffirming a debt and feel it will not be filed before the discharge deadline, notify the clerk's office in writing to delay entry of the discharge until the reaffirmation is filed.

Reaffirmations are strictly voluntary. If you wish to reaffirm (agree to pay back) any particular debt, you must enter into a written agreement with the creditor, which legally obligates you to pay all or a portion of a dischargeable (wiped out by the bankruptcy) debt. The form for this is Form 240A Reaffirmation Agreement. The creditor and debtor must fully complete the form indicating the nature of the debt, the value of the collateral, and the reason for reaffirmation. Both parties to the reaffirmation must sign on the appropriate signature lines. Since you are not represented by an attorney, the reaffirmation will be automatically set for hearing and you will receive written notice of the hearing date and time. You must appear at the hearing where the judge will determine if it is in your best interests to reaffirm, based on your circumstances and the nature of the reaffirmation. For example, the court may not allow you to reaffirm a debt of $3,000 for a vehicle that may be worth $1,000.

If a debtor reaffirms a debt and fails to pay it, the debt remains owed as though there were no bankruptcy and the creditor can take action to collect the debt. This reaffirmed debt is not discharged or wiped out by the bankruptcy filing.

The Court does not need to approve a reaffirmation agreement which applies to consumer debt secured by real estate. This applies to any mortgages on your home or other debts secured by your home. In addition, the Court does not approve any reaffirmation agreements between debtors and credit unions. They are filed and become part of the record without a hearing.

You have the right to cancel (rescind) any reaffirmation at any time prior to the entry of your discharge or within 60 days after the reaffirmation agreement is filed with the court, whichever occurs later. To rescind a reaffirmation agreement, you must mail a written notice to the creditor stating that you are withdrawing your decision to reaffirm and revoking the agreement. Send the original letter to the creditor and a copy to the clerk's office to be made part of your file.

Completion of Reaffirmation Agreement Form All reaffirmations must be filed with Official Form B27, the reaffirmation cover sheet. The Reaffirmation Agreement (Official Form B240A) has been amended effective December 1, 2009. In order to allow filers sufficient time to implement the form change, the Court will allow a six-month transition period during which time either the old (1/07), or new (12/09), versions of the Reaffirmation Agreement may be filed. Note: Effective April 1, 2010, the newly amended Reaffirmation Agreement form will become mandatory. All pro se reaffirmation agreements that do not involve credit unions or real estate will be automatically set for hearing, regardless of whether a presumption of undue hardship has arisen. If the reaffirmation agreement involves real estate and/or a credit union, no further action will be taken.

The January 2007 Reaffirmation Agreement is divided into various parts:

Parts A-E - consisting of the Debtor's Disclosures, Reaffirmation Agreement, Attorney Certification, Debtor's Statement in Support of Reaffirmation, and Motion for Court Approval make up the document required to reaffirm a debt. Instructions appear within the reaffirmation agreement form.

Part A - Debtor's Disclosures: Summary of Reaffirmation Agreement. Complete this section giving details of the agreement: Amount to be reaffirmed, percentage rate, payment to be made. Part B - The Reaffirmation Agreement Requires signature(s) of both the representative of the creditor and the debtor(s).

Part C - Certification by Debtor's Attorney - Not Applicable for a Pro Se Debtor Part D - The Debtor's Statement in Support of the Reaffirmation. Debtor's signature required! This section indicates to the Court that the debtor can make the payments without undue hardship. If there is a presumption of undue hardship, the debtor can explain how the hardship will be overcome.

Part E is the Debtor's Motion for Court Approval and must be signed by debtors who are not represented by an attorney.

Defective Reaffirmation Agreements A reaffirmation agreement will be considered defective and will be stricken if: • It is not filed on Official Form 240 A(1/07), or if • The debtor and/or creditor fails to sign any of the required parts of the agreement.

A reaffirmation agreement will be considered defective if Part E is not completed. Failure to submit a completed Part E within the deficiency period (15 days) will result in the agreement being stricken.
