= GE Artesia Bank =

Former bank in the Netherlands

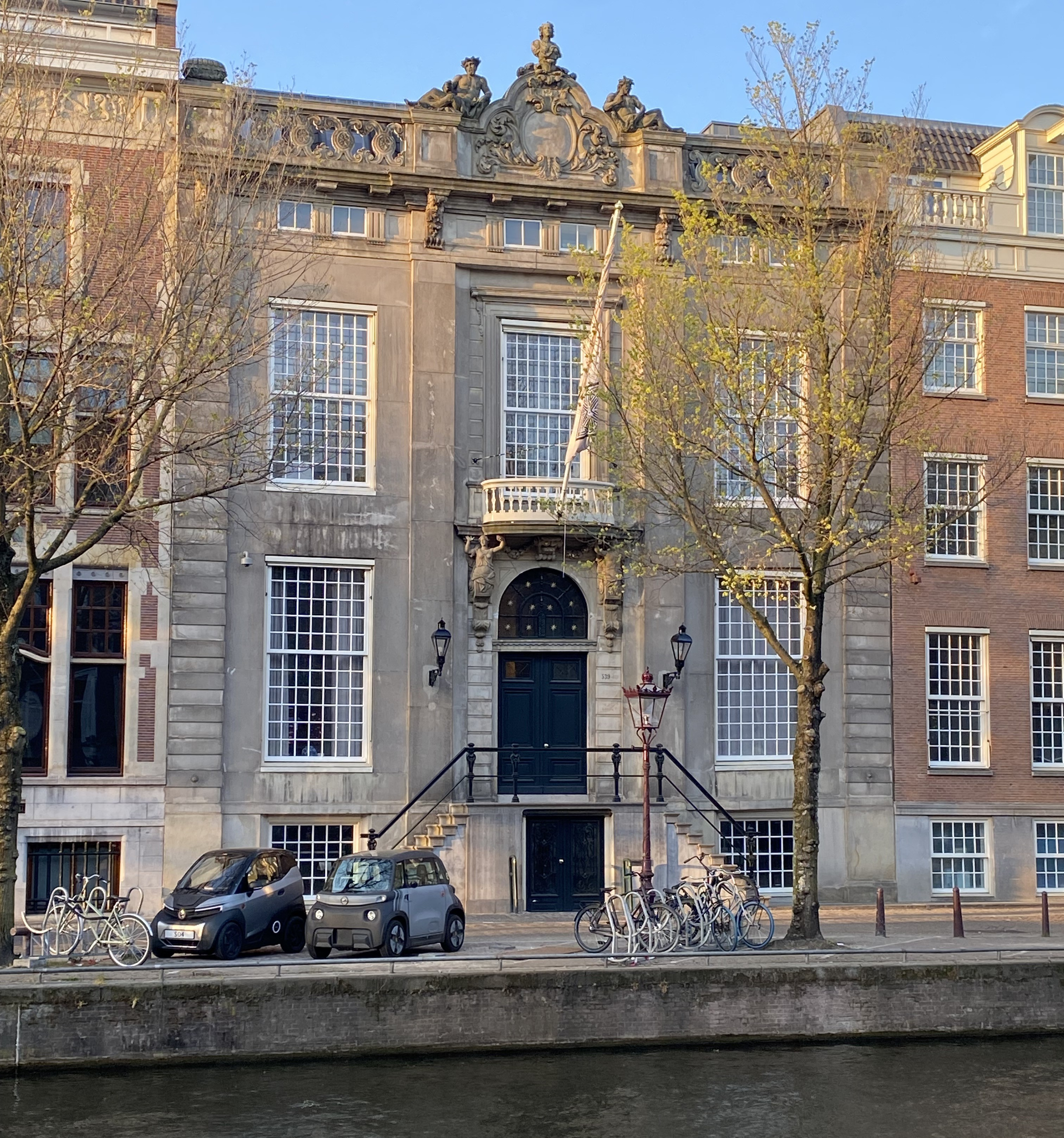
Building at Herengracht 539 in Amsterdam, part of the former head office complex of GE Artesia Bank

GE Artesia Bank was a Dutch financial institution based in Rotterdam and Amsterdam. It was originally established in 1863 as the Nederlandsche Credit- en Deposito Bank (French: Banque de Crédit et de Dépôt des Pays-Bas).

== Company history ==
The bank has undergone a number of name changes since its inception. In 1872 it became a member of the Paribas group and was renamed Banque de Paris et des Pays-Bas N.V., and in 1984 the name changed to Banque Paribas Nederland NV. On March 11, 1998, following the formation of Artesia Banking Corp., the name changed to Banque Artesia Nederland N.V. On December 28, 2006 the bank was taken over by GE Commercial Finance and now operates under the trade name GE Artesia Bank.

On March 4, 2015, the Dutch newspaper FD reported GE pulled the plug out of GE Artesia Bank.

== Services ==
GE Artesia Bank is situated in Rotterdam and Amsterdam, the Netherlands. GE Artesia Bank offers finance for specific international trade transactions and provides working capital solutions.

== Management ==
Management Board: Hubert Esperon (Chairman, Chief Executive Officer), John-Harold Every (COO) and Johan Benning (Chief Financial Officer).

Senior Management Team: Hubert Esperon (CEO), Johan Benning (CFO), D. Rendell (CRO), J-H Every (COO), B. Schutz (General Counsel), M. Best (Strategic Initiatives) and M. Ilieva (Human Resources Leader).

== Head Office ==
In Amsterdam, the Banque de Crédit et de Dépôt des Pays-Bas and its successor from 1872 the Banque de Paris et des Pays-Bas were headquartered in the 18th-century mansion at Herengracht 539, then expanded to the adjacent properties at Herengracht 541 and 543. In the 1960s, No. 541 was entirely rebuilt to extend it to nearly twice its size at the back. The property was successively inherited by Banque Paribas Nederland in 1984, Banque Artesia Nederland in 1998, and GE Artesia Bank in 2006.

After GE terminated Artesia Bank's operations in the Netherlands in 2015, the property was refurbished by developer REB Projects into luxury apartments and offices at Herengracht 541, the latter used as headquarters by Rituals Cosmetics Trade BV, part of cosmetics group Rituals. The apartment complex, branded The Artesia and completed in 2018, also includes a series of structures across the urban block on Reguliersdwarsstraat and a garden between the two sets of buildings.

== See also ==
- List of banks in the Netherlands
