= Cembra Money Bank =

Swiss credit institution listed on the Swiss stock exchange

Cembra Money Bank AG
- Type: Joint-stock company
- ISIN: CH0225173167
- Industry: Financial services
- Founded: 2013; 13 years ago (initial public offering, formerly GE Money Bank)
- Headquarters: Altstetten (Zürich), Switzerland
- Key people: Holger Laubenthal (CEO); Franco Morra (Chairman)
- Number of employees: 826 (2025)
- Website: www.cembra.ch

Cembra Money Bank AG is a leading Swiss provider of innovative financing and payment solutions headquartered in Zurich-Altstetten. Cembra operated under the name GE Money Bank until its IPO in early November 2013 and was part of the General Electric Group. Since November 2013, the bank has been listed on the Swiss stock exchange. Its main shareholders are currently UBS Fund Management (Switzerland), Dimensional Holdings Inc., Swisscanto Fondsleitung AG and BlackRock Inc.

== History ==
Bank Prokredit was founded in 1912. In 1998, it came under the wing of GE Capital, which, the year before, had already acquired another Swiss consumer credit business, Bank Aufina, founded in 1953. It was not until 2006 that Prokredit, which had previously belonged to UBS, and Bank Aufina merged under the name GE Money Bank.

This was followed by the IPO as Cembra Money Bank AG in the fall of 2013. The successful IPO is considered the first major IPO on the Swiss stock exchange in a long time. The name Cembra is derived from the Latin name for the Swiss stone pine pinus cembra and symbolizes the brand values of Cembra. In 2019, Cembra acquired cashgate AG from the Aduno Group. In the first year of the COVID-19 pandemic (2020), accounts receivables dropped by 4% to CHF 6.3 billion.

In spring 2023, Cembra launched the new business unit CembraPay and bundled its subsidiaries Swissbilling and Byjuno into it. The launch of the new brand was a further step in the expansion of the Buy Now Pay Later (BNPL) business. As part of this strategy, Swissbilling's invoice payment service was also integrated into the Swiss mobile payment app TWINT as a pay later feature during checkout, thereby offering digitalized invoice payments directly within the app.

== Business areas ==
Cembra's product range includes personal loans, and auto leases and loans, credit cards, the insurance made available in this context, invoice financing and savings products. The bank conducts its business in all parts of Switzerland through a network of branches, its online presence as well as credit card partners, independent intermediaries and car dealers. In July 2022 Cembra launched Certo!, its own credit card family. All of the bank's cards can be used with Apple Pay, Google Pay, Samsung Pay, Garmin Pay, Fitbit Pay, and SwatchPay! and Click-to-Pay.

== Management ==
Holger Laubenthal is CEO and Franco Morra is chairman of the board of directors.
