= 0% finance =

Discounted finance used to attract buyers of consumer goods

0% financing or zero percent financing, alternatively known as discounted finance, is a widely used marketing tactic for attracting buyers of consumer goods, automobiles, real estate, or credit cards in different parts of the world.

== Definition ==
For the buyer, the scheme is offered as a steal, without any levied interest for a specific period, subject to special terms or conditions.

== Mathematics behind 0% finance ==
The financial mathematics behind the 0% finance scheme is somewhat complex, as the calculation differs with respect to the type of product and the country. These deals are offered by finance companies or banks in conjunction with a manufacturer or dealer network. The schemes offer "zero percent" finance, where a customer pays for the financing cost in an indirect manner. The indirect cost will include paying a processing fee, a significant amount as advance EMIs (equated monthly installments), as well as a minimum cash down payment. Often, the biggest cost may involve forfeiting a cash discount which might otherwise be available on a cash purchase.

Suppose a customer opted for 0% finance to buy an electronic device worth $1000, offered on a term of 6 months' EMIs, with a $50 application processing fee and one month's EMI in advance. This sale actually results in a 12.48% effective interest rate for the customer.

Several central banks have reacted strongly to zero percent or discounted interest rate schemes and want them stopped, as they feel consumers are misguided by such schemes into believing that bank funding comes for free. As such, schemes serve the purpose of attracting and exploiting vulnerable customers.

Many agreements charge interest on the full price (backdated to the original purchase date) if the remaining debt is not cleared before the end of the free credit period. It has been suggested that credit providers make payment arrangements intentionally more difficult and exploit consumers' expectation that they will be sufficiently reminded (either by not reminding them or by presenting the reminder in an inconspicuous manner) in order to invoke this clause and generate income. Moreover, it has also been noted that with higher-value purchases such as car deals, the costs for the 0%-financing are compensated by going up with the price of the item.
