= Synchrony Financial =

American financial services company

- Type: Public
- Traded as: NYSE: SYF; S&P 500 component
- Industry: Financial services
- Founded: September 12, 2003; 23 years ago
- Headquarters: Stamford
- Key people: Margaret M. Keane (Executive Chairman); Brian Doubles (CEO)
- Products: Credit cards Payment systems
- Revenue: ▲US$24.17 billion (2024)
- Net income: ▲US$3.427 billion (2024)
- Total assets: ▲US$119.5 billion (2024)
- Total equity: ▲US$16.58 billion (2024)
- Number of employees: 20,000 (2024)
- Website: synchrony.com

Synchrony Financial is an American consumer financial services company with its headquarters in Stamford, Connecticut. The company offers consumer financing products including credit, promotional financing, loyalty programs, and installment lending to both industries and consumers through Synchrony Bank, its wholly owned online bank subsidiary.

Synchrony owns CareCredit, a credit card for medical and veterinary expenses.

== History ==
Previously named GE Capital Retail Finance Corporation, Synchrony was incorporated in Delaware in 2003. The company was inactive until 2013. Centered on co-branded credit products, Synchrony went public in July 2014 and raised $2.88 billion in its initial public offering.

Synchrony acquired GPShopper in 2017. In 2018, it acquired Loop Commerce, which provides a digital gifting platform called GiftNow. The same year, it acquired PayPal's $7.6 billion credit receivables portfolio and became the exclusive issuer for the PayPal Credit point-of-sale financing program in the United States through 2028.

GIC Private Limited, the sovereign wealth fund of Singapore, owned 7.72% of Synchrony's stock in 2019. GIC exited its position in 2023.

== Regulatory and legal issues ==
In June 2014, shortly before Synchrony's New York Stock Exchange debut, the Consumer Financial Protection Bureau (CFPB) and the Department of Justice reached a $225 million settlement with the company after it entered into a consent decree with the CFPB. The settlement stated that while operating as GE Capital Bank, the company had engaged in deceptive and discriminatory credit card practices, primarily surrounding deceptive enrollment practices for add-on programs such as financial hardship relief.

In 2020, consumer advocacy groups urged the CFPB and Comptroller of the Currency to investigate the use of PayPal Credit to pay tuition at for-profit schools, where students are generally ineligible for lower-cost federal loans. The advocacy groups classified the 24% interest rates, $40 late fees, and aggressive collection practices as "predatory."

In August 2024, a class action suit was filed in New York alleging that CareCredit's interest rates of 32.99% violate state usury laws.
