= Court of Session Act =

Ambiguous British legislative short title

Court of Session Act is a stock short title used in the United Kingdom for legislation relating to the Court of Session.

== List ==
- 19 Geo. 2. c. 7 is sometimes referred to as the Court of Session (Scotland) Act 1745

The Court of Session Acts 1808 to 1895 is the collective title of the following acts:

- The Court of Session Act 1808 (48 Geo. 3. c. 151)
- The Court of Session Act 1810 (50 Geo. 3. c. 112)
- The Court of Session Act 1813 (53 Geo. 3. c. 64)
- The Court of Session Act 1819 (59 Geo. 3. c. 45)
- The Court of Session Act 1821 (1 & 2 Geo. 4. c. 38)
- The Court of Session Act 1825 (6 Geo. 4. c. 120)
- The Court of Session Act 1830 (11 Geo. 4 & 1 Will. 4. c. 69)
- The Court of Session (No. 1) Act 1838 (1 & 2 Vict. c. 86)
- The Court of Session (No. 2) Act 1838 (1 & 2 Vict. c. 118)
- The Court of Session Act 1839 (2 & 3 Vict. c. 36)
- The Court of Session Act 1850 (13 & 14 Vict. c. 36)
- The Bill Chamber Procedure Act 1857 (20 & 21 Vict. c. 18)
- The Court of Session Act 1857 (20 & 21 Vict. c. 56)
- The Court of Session Act 1868 (31 & 32 Vict. c. 100)
- The Court of Session (Consignations) Scotland Act 1895 (58 & 59 Vict. c. 19)

== See also ==
- List of short titles
