= Administration of Justice (Scotland) Act 1933 =

Act of the Parliament of the United Kingdom

Administration of Justice (Scotland) Act 1933 (Note: Section 41(1).)
- Act of Parliament
- Parliament of the United Kingdom
- Long title: An Act to amend the law of Scotland relating to the Court of Session and procedure therein, to the appointment of Officers in the said Court and the High Court of Justiciary, to criminal jury trials and to the Sheriffs and procedure in the Sheriff Court, and with regard to solicitors' fees; and for purposes connected therewith.
- Citation: 23 & 24 Geo. 5. c. 41
- Territorial extent: Scotland

Dates
- Royal assent: 28 July 1933
- Commencement: 28 July 1933 (sections 1 and 2, parts III and IV); 9 October 1934; (Note: Section 41(2)–(3).)
Other legislation
Amends	Court of Session Act 1723; Court of Session Act 1808; Court of Session Act 1810; Court of Session Act 1813; Jury Trials (Scotland) Act 1815Court of Session Act 1821; Court of Session Act 1825; Court of Session Act 1830Court of Session (No. 1) Act 1838; Debtors (Scotland) Act 1838; Court of Session (No. 2) Act 1838; Court of Session Act 1839; Court of Session Act 1850; Bill Chamber Procedure Act 1857; Court of Session Act 1857; Conjugal Rights (Scotland) Amendment Act 1861; Glebe Lands (Scotland) Act, 1866; Evidence (Scotland) Act 1866]; Railway Companies (Scotland) Act 1867; Entail Amendment (Scotland) Act 1868; Court of Session Act 1868; Parliamentary Elections Act 1868; Criminal Procedure (Scotland) Act 1887; Clerks of Session (Scotland) Regulation Act 1889; Burgh Police (Scotland) Act 1892; Nautical Assessors (Scotland) Act 1894; Fatal Accidents Inquiry (Scotland) Act 1895; Circuit Clerks (Scotland) Act 1898; Sheriff Courts (Scotland) Act 1907; Court of Session (Extracts) Act 1916; Solicitors (Scotland) Act 1933
Repeals/revokes	Minors Act 1555; Court of Session Adjournment Act 1762; Clerks of Session (Scotland) Regulation Act 1913
Amended by	Statute Law Revision Act 1950; Sheriffs' Pensions (Scotland) Act 1961; Statute Law Revision Act 1963; Criminal Procedure (Scotland) Act 1965; Law Reform (Miscellaneous Provisions) (Scotland) Act 1966; Law Reform (Miscellaneous Provisions) (Scotland) Act 1968; Sheriff Courts (Scotland) Act 1971; Superannuation Act 1972; Administration of Justice (Scotland) Act 1972; Statute Law (Repeals) Act 1975; Criminal Procedure (Scotland) Act 1975; Fatal Accidents and Sudden Deaths Inquiry (Scotland) Act 1976; Administration of Justice Act 1977; Law Reform (Miscellaneous Provisions) (Scotland) Act 1980; Statute Law (Repeals) Act 1981; Law Reform (Miscellaneous Provisions) (Scotland) Act 1985; Act of Sederunt (Rules of Court Amendment No. 8) (Miscellaneous) 1986; Court of Session Act 1988; Age of Legal Capacity (Scotland) Act 1991; Scotland Act 1998; Scotland Act 1998 (Consequential Modifications) (No. 2) Order 1999; Judiciary and Courts (Scotland) Act 2008; Civil Litigation (Expenses and Group Proceedings) (Scotland) Act 2018

Status: Amended

Text of statute as originally enacted

Revised text of statute as amended

Text of the Administration of Justice (Scotland) Act 1933 as in force today (including any amendments) within the United Kingdom, from legislation.gov.uk.

The Administration of Justice (Scotland) Act 1933 (23 & 24 Geo. 5. c. 41) is an act of the Parliament of the United Kingdom legislating for Scotland which introduced changes in Scottish legal procedure "following the recommendations of a Royal Commission which reported in 1927".

== Background ==
The act was introduced following the Royal Commission on the Court of Session and the Office of Sheriff Principal.

== The judiciary ==
The act abolished the ancient practice of a trial (or examination) of qualifications of a nominee for appointment as a judge of the Court of Session (s. 1). The Bill Chamber^{A} was abolished (s. 3) and an additional division of the Inner House was created (s. 2). It provided new arrangements for the sittings of judges (granting them a power to extend a session if required) and for the work of the vacation judge (s. 4).

== Officers of the courts ==
Provisions were made for the appointment of officers of the High Court of Justiciary and the Court of Session and their superannuation arrangements.

== Civil procedure ==
=== Court of Session ===
The act ended the right of parties to choose the judge (Lord Ordinary) or Division for the hearing of their causes or appeals (s. 5). It simplified the form of proceedings (ss. 6-9) and created a procedure to allow summary trial (by a judge without a jury) (s. 10).

A procedure for a simple majority verdict by a jury was introduced (majority verdicts had long been available to criminal juries in Scotland). Provision for made for situations where a juror died or became unfit to continue serving (s. 11).^{B}

=== Rules Councils ===
A Rules Council for the Court of Session and another for the Sheriff Courts were established fashioned on the Rule Committee of the Supreme Court in England. They were given a power to draft rules regarding any matters about which Acts of Sederunt may be made. These were then to be submitted to the Court which might enact them (with or without amendment) in an Act of Sederunt. An express power was granted so that, as "in the similar provision for rules of court in England, an Act of Sederunt may "modify, amend or repeal any enactments, including enactments contained in this Act," relating to procedure."

Both Scottish Rules Councils included representatives of the judiciary and the two branches of the legal profession (advocates and solicitors); and the Lord President of the Court of Session was made an ex officio member of both Councils.

The statutory power to make acts of Sederunt granted in sections 16 and 17 of the act was consolidated and replaced by sections 5 and 6 of the Court of Session Act 1988 (UK).

== Criminal procedure ==
Courts were given a discretion to continue a solemn proceeding in cases where a juror died or became unfit to continue serving, provided that the number of continuing jurors was not less than twelve.^{B} Should the jury return a majority verdict of guilty, there must be at least eight jurors supporting that verdict.

Either side in criminal trials on indictment were given a right to admit documents without formal proof by the other side; by agreement between the prosecution and defence, copies of documents might be tendered as if they were the originals; but, if not legally represented, the accused may not so admit nor agree.

== Sheriffdoms ==
A power to reorganise the then fifteen territorial sheriffs and the sheriff of Chancery was created. The Secretary of State for Scotland was permitted to form new sheriffdoms by uniting two or more counties or parts of counties should a vacancy occur in the office of sheriff; but such orders were not to take effect until both Houses of Parliament have resolved to approved them.

== 1934 Rules of Court ==
After commencement of the act, new Rules of Court for the Court of Session were embodied by Act of Sederunt in 1934. The then Lord President Clyde wrote in the Preface to the new Rules:

"The purpose of these Rules is not to provide a comprehensive summary of Court of Session procedure, but to reform and extend the existing procedure so far as necessary to adapt it to the new conditions created by the act ....
"As regards matters of procedure, the act restores to the Court of Session its ancient autonomy which modern legislation had almost smothered."

== See also ==
- Administration of Justice (Scotland) Act 1972 (UK)
- Court of Session Act 1988 (UK)

== Notes ==
A. The Bill Chamber was "under the same roof" as the Court of Session, but was a separate court or jurisdiction. Its history and function were discussed in the Report of the Royal Commission on the Court of Session and the Office of Sheriff Principal (1927) which concluded "the usefulness of the Bill Chamber as a Court separate from the Court of Session no longer exists."

B. Juries in civil causes are impanelled in Scotland with twelve jurors and fifteen jurors in solemn proceedings of criminal charges.
