= Court of Session Act 1813 =

Act of the Parliament of the United Kingdom

Court of Session Act 1813 (Note: The citation of this act by this short title was authorised by section 1 of, and the first schedule to, the Short Titles Act 1896. Due to the repeal of those provisions it is now authorised by section 19(2) of the Interpretation Act 1978.)
- Act of Parliament
- Parliament of the United Kingdom
- Long title: An Act for the better Regulation of the Court of Session in Scotland.
- Citation: 53 Geo. 3. c. 64
- Territorial extent: United Kingdom

Dates
- Royal assent: 3 June 1813
- Commencement: 3 June 1813 (Note: Section 1.)
- Repealed: 29 July 1988
Other legislation
Amends	Court of Session Act 1808
Amended by	Statute Law Revision Act 1873; Statute Law Revision Act 1874; Statute Law Revision Act 1888; Administration of Justice (Scotland) Act 1933
Repealed by	Court of Session Act 1988
Relates to	Court of Session Act 1810

Status: Repealed

Text of statute as originally enacted

The Court of Session Act 1813 (53 Geo. 3. c. 64) was an act of the Parliament of the United Kingdom which reformed Scotland's highest court, the Court of Session. The act continued reforms to the Court of Session begun by the Court of Session Act 1808 (48 Geo. 3. c. 151) and the Court of Session Act 1810 (50 Geo. 3. c. 112), creating the divisions known as the Inner House and the Outer House.

== Subsequent developments ==
The whole act was repealed by section 52(2) of, and part I of schedule 2 to, the Court of Session Act 1988, which came into force on 29 September 1988.
