= 2024 United Kingdom budget =

2024 United Kingdom budget may refer to:

- The March 2024 United Kingdom budget presented by Jeremy Hunt
- The October 2024 United Kingdom budget presented by Rachel Reeves
