= Bill Chamber =

The Bill Chamber was formerly a court of Scotland, often considered as part of the Court of Session but in fact separate from it. It dealt with petitions for suspension (appeal), interdict, sequestrations etc., and was the approximate equivalent to sittings in camera (in chambers) in American or English law.

The Bill Chamber was "under the same roof" as the Court of Session, but was a separate court or jurisdiction. Its history and function were discussed in the report of the Royal Commission on the Court of Session and the Office of Sheriff Principal (1927) which concluded "the usefulness of the Bill Chamber as a Court separate from the Court of Session no longer exists" and it was thus abolished by the Administration of Justice (Scotland) Act 1933.

Some of its processes are now carried out by the Accountant in Bankruptcy.

== See also ==
- Bankruptcy in Scotland
- Bill of suspension
- Interdicts in Scots law
- Bill Chamber Procedure Act 1857
