= Court of Session Act 1808 =

Act of the Parliament of the United Kingdom

Court of Session Act 1808 (Note: The citation of this act by this short title was authorised by section 1 of, and the first schedule to, the Short Titles Act 1896. Due to the repeal of those provisions it is now authorised by section 19(2) of the Interpretation Act 1978.)
- Act of Parliament
- Parliament of the United Kingdom
- Long title: An Act concerning the Administration of Justice in Scotland and concerning Appeals to the House of Lords.
- Citation: 48 Geo. 3. c. 151
- Territorial extent: United Kingdom

Dates
- Royal assent: 4 July 1808
- Commencement: 12 November 1808 (Note: Section 1.)
- Repealed: 29 September 1988
Other legislation
Amended by	Administration of Justice (Scotland) Act 1809; Court of Session Act 1813; Statute Law Revision Act 1872 (No. 2); Statute Law Revision Act 1888; Administration of Justice (Scotland) Act 1933
Repealed by	Court of Session Act 1988

Status: Repealed

Text of statute as originally enacted

The Court of Session Act 1808 (48 Geo. 3. c. 151), also known as the Administration of Justice (Scotland) Act 1808, was an act of the Parliament of the United Kingdom (48 Geo. 3. c. 151) which reformed Scotland's highest court, the Court of Session. Reform of the Court of Session had been proposed as early as 1805 by the Whig government trying to impose a system based on that of England, especially the use of a civil jury trial. That particular government fell before their reform bill was enacted. In 1808, reform was pushed through by a Tory government. The Court was split into two divisions. Judgments of the new divisions could only be appealed to the House of Lords at the leave of the division, or in the case of a dispute between its judges. Decrees of the Lords Ordinary could only be appealed to the House of Lords after being reviews by the Divisional judges. The act also established a commission to review the processes of the Court of Session, including the possibility of the introduction of jury trial and the creation of permanent Lords Ordinary.

== Subsequent developments ==
The Commissioner's review led to two further acts, the Court of Session Act 1810 (50 Geo. 3. c. 112) and the Court of Session Act 1813 (53 Geo. 3. c. 64). These two acts created the existing system of two divisions known as the Outer House and the Inner House. Trial by jury came later with the Jury Trials (Scotland) Act 1815 (55 Geo. 3. c. 42).

The whole act was repealed by section 52(2) of, and part I of schedule 2 to, the Court of Session Act 1988, which came into force on 29 September 1988.
