= Interdict (disambiguation) =

The term Interdict may refer to:

== Religion ==
- Interdict, an ecclesiastical penalty which temporarily bars a specific person or group of people from receiving the sacraments

== Legal ==
- A court forbidding or enforcing a certain action, such as:
  - Court order
  - Injunction
  - Interdicts in Scots law

== Military ==
- Interdiction, to attack enemy resupply lines.
  - Air interdiction, the use of aircraft to attack targets behind the front lines
