= Court of Exchequer (Scotland) =

Former part of the court system of Scotland

The Court of Exchequer was formerly a distinct part of the court system of Scotland, with responsibility for administration of government revenue and jurisdiction of adjudicate on cases relating to customs and excise, revenue, stamp duty and probate. In 1856 the Court of Session was designated as the Exchequer Court, which now carries out its judicial functions.

Following the merger of the two courts, a Lord Ordinary - one of the Senators of the College of Justice - is designated as the Lord Ordinary in Exchequer cases.

== History ==
The date of establishment of an Exchequer Court is unknown because of the loss of ancient records. Originally, Crown revenues were managed by overseers who came to be known as the Lords Auditors of the Checker, later King's Compositors, then Lords of Exchequer. There is evidence that the Lords Auditors of Exchequer were sitting as a court by 1500, but under the jurisdiction of the King's Council. Charles I of Scotland appointed Lords Commissioners of Exchequer whose authority was both administrative and judicial, and it was during the Commonwealth under Oliver Cromwell that they became known as the Court of Exchequer.

Article 16 of the Act of Union 1707 provided:

"And that there be a Court of Exchequer in Scotland after the Union, for deciding Questions concerning the Revenues of Customs and Excises there, having the same power and authority in such cases, as the Court of Exchequer has in England And that the said Court of Exchequer in Scotland have power of passing Signatures, Gifts Tutories, and in other things as the Court of Exchequer in Scotland hath; And that the Court of Exchequer that now is in Scotland do remain, until a New Court of Exchequer be settled by the Parliament of Great Britain in Scotland after the Union;"

The new Court of Exchequer was established by the Exchequer Court (Scotland) Act 1707. It provided that the judges of the Court were to be the Lord High Treasurer of Great Britain and such other persons who might be appointed by royal commission, and who were known as the Chief Baron of Exchequer and Barons of Exchequer. The number of Barons of Exchequer was limited to five. The Court's jurisdiction related to customs and excise and matters of revenue, stamp duty and probate. It appears to have implemented English law in its determinations.

In 1856 the jurisdiction of the Exchequer Court was transferred to the Court of Session by the Exchequer Court (Scotland) Act 1856, which became the Court of Exchequer in Scotland. One of the Lords Ordinary in the Outer House of the Court of Session is to be designated as Lord Ordinary in Exchequer Causes; this was restated by the Court of Session Act 1988. The 1856 Act stated:

The whole power, authority, and jurisdiction at present belonging to the Court of Exchequer in Scotland, as at present constituted, shall be transferred to and vested in the Court of Session, and the Court of Session shall be also the Court of Exchequer in Scotland.

— Section 1, Exchequer Court (Scotland) Act 1856

The Lord Ordinary in Exchequer Cases is designated by order of the Lord President of the Court of Session under powers granted by Schedule 4 of the Law Reform (Miscellaneous Provisions) (Scotland) Act 1990, which amended previous enactments requiring the appointment to be made by Act of Sederunt.

== Remit and jurisdiction ==
The Court's jurisdiction related to customs and excise and matters of revenue, stamp duty and probate.

In modern times the business of the court consists in the main of appeals on law from the determination of the Special Commissioners of Income Tax on issues of liability to tax. The procedure for exchequer cases is determined by Chapters 41 and 48 of the Rules of the Court of Session.

== Chief Baron of the Court of Exchequer ==
- James Ogilvy, 4th Earl of Findlater (1707–1708)
- John Smith (1709–1726)
- Matthew Lunt (1726–1741)
- John Idle (1741–1755)
- Robert Ord (1755–1775)
- Sir James Montgomery of Stanhope (1775–1801)
- Robert Dundas of Arniston (1801–1819)
- Sir Samuel Shepherd (1819–1830)
- James Abercromby (1830–1832)

The office of Chief Baron was abolished in 1832, 24 years before the court was merged with the Court of Session.
