= List of acts of the Parliament of Scotland from 1594 =

This is a list of acts of the Parliament of Scotland for the year 1594.

It lists acts of Parliament of the old Parliament of Scotland, that was merged with the old Parliament of England to form the Parliament of Great Britain, by the Union with England Act 1707 (c. 7).

For other years, see list of acts of the Parliament of Scotland. For the period after 1707, see list of acts of the Parliament of Great Britain.

== 1594 ==
The 14th parliament of James VI, held in Edinburgh from 22 April 1594.

Short title, or popular name	Citation	Royal assent
Long title
Not public and general	1594 c. 1 (Note: This is the citation in the Record Edition.) — (Note: This act is not listed in the Duodecimal Edition.)	8 June 1594
Ratificatioun of the forfaltour of Frances sumtyme erll Bothuill.
Not public and general	1594 c. 2 —	
Declaratioun anent the annexatioun of Kelso and Coldinghame.
Mass Act 1594 (repealed)	1594 c. 3; 1594 c. 196 (Note: This is the citation in the Duodecimal Edition.)	8 June 1594
Aganis wilfull heiraris of messe. (Repealed by Statute Law Revision (Scotland) Act 1906 (6 Edw. 7. c. 38))
Papists Act 1594 (repealed)	1594 c. 4; 1594 c. 197	8 June 1594
Anent satisfactioun to the kirk be papistes. (Repealed by Statute Law Revision (Scotland) Act 1906 (6 Edw. 7. c. 38))
Erections after Annexation Act 1594 (repealed)	1594 c. 5; 1594 c. 198	8 June 1594
Aganis erectionis efter the annexatioun. (Repealed by Statute Law Revision (Scotland) Act 1906 (6 Edw. 7. c. 38))
Provision of Churches Act 1594 (repealed)	1594 c. 6; 1594 c. 199	8 June 1594
For provisioun of commoun kirkis. (Repealed by Statute Law Revision (Scotland) Act 1906 (6 Edw. 7. c. 38))
Excommunication Act 1594 (repealed)	1594 c. 7; 1594 c. 200	8 June 1594
Anent eschaetis and lyfrentis of excommunicat personis. (Repealed by Statute Law Revision (Scotland) Act 1906 (6 Edw. 7. c. 38))
Sunday Act 1594 (repealed)	1594 c. 8; 1594 c. 201	8 June 1594
For the better observing of the sabboth day. (Repealed by Statute Law Revision (Scotland) Act 1964 (c. 80)
Manses and Glebes Act 1594 (repealed)	1594 c. 9; 1594 c. 202	8 June 1594
For relief of thame quhais landis ar or salbe designit for manssis and gleibis to ministeris. (Repealed by Statute Law Revision (Scotland) Act 1964 (c. 80)
Patron's Consent to Tacks Act 1594 (repealed)	1594 c. 10; 1594 c. 203	8 June 1594
Anent setting of takkis without consent of the patrone. (Repealed by Statute Law Revision (Scotland) Act 1906 (6 Edw. 7. c. 38))
Repeal Act 1594 (repealed)	1594 c. 11; 1594 c. 204	8 June 1594
Annulling of actis of parliament maid in favour of vassellis of personis foirfaltit. (Repealed by Statute Law Revision (Scotland) Act 1906 (6 Edw. 7. c. 38))
Forfeited Persons Act 1594 (repealed)	1594 c. 12; 1594 c. 205	8 June 1594
Anent fraudfull dispositionis maid be personis foirfaltit. (Repealed by Statute Law Revision (Scotland) Act 1906 (6 Edw. 7. c. 38))
Annexation Act 1594 (repealed)	1594 c. 13; 1594 c. 206	8 June 1594
Ratificatioun of the actis maid for annexatioun of the propirtie and annulling of dispositionis maid in princes minorities. (Repealed by Statute Law Revision (Scotland) Act 1906 (6 Edw. 7. c. 38))
Dissolution Act 1594 (repealed)	1594 c. 14; 1594 c. 207	8 June 1594
General dissolutioun of the propirtie. (Repealed by Statute Law Revision (Scotland) Act 1906 (6 Edw. 7. c. 38))
Leasing Makers Act 1594 (repealed)	1594 c. 15; 1594 c. 208	8 June 1594
Anent lesing makaris and authouris of sklanderis. (Repealed by Statute Law Revision (Scotland) Act 1906 (6 Edw. 7. c. 38))
Wines Act 1594 (repealed)	1594 c. 16; 1594 c. 209	8 June 1594
Anent payment of the dewtie of the wynes. (Repealed by Statute Law Revision (Scotland) Act 1906 (6 Edw. 7. c. 38))
Pensions Act 1594 (repealed)	1594 c. 17; 1594 c. 210	8 June 1594
Annulling of pensionis furth of the erectionis sen the annexatioun. (Repealed by Statute Law Revision (Scotland) Act 1906 (6 Edw. 7. c. 38))
Officers of Arms Act 1594 (repealed)	1594 c. 18; 1594 c. 211	8 June 1594
Anent souirties for officiaris off armes. (Repealed by Statute Law Revision (Scotland) Act 1906 (6 Edw. 7. c. 38))
Suspensions Act 1594 (repealed)	1594 c. 19; 1594 c. 212	8 June 1594
For tryall of the treuth of acquittances in suspensionis. (Repealed by Statute Law Revision (Scotland) Act 1906 (6 Edw. 7. c. 38))
King's Parks Act 1594 (repealed)	1594 c. 20; 1594 c. 210	8 June 1594
Anent haning of the kingis parkis and forrestis and incres of wyldfoull and vennysoun. (Repealed by Statute Law Revision (Scotland) Act 1906 (6 Edw. 7. c. 38))
College of Justice Act 1594 (repealed)	1594 c. 21; 1594 c. 211	8 June 1594
Anent the privilegis of the College of Justice. (Repealed by Statute Law Revision (Scotland) Act 1906 (6 Edw. 7. c. 38))
Declinature Act 1594 (repealed)	1594 c. 22; 1594 c. 212	8 June 1594
Anent the declyning of the senatouris off the college of iustice quha ar father brother or sone to the pairties. (Repealed by Court of Session Act 1988 (c. 36))
Vacation Act 1594 (repealed)	1594 c. 23; 1594 c. 227	8 June 1594
Anent the beginning of the harvest vacance. (Repealed by Statute Law Revision (Scotland) Act 1906 (6 Edw. 7. c. 38))
Prescription Act 1594 (repealed)	1594 c. 24; 1594 c. 218	8 June 1594
That nane salbe compellit to produce procuratories or instrumentis of resignatioun preceptis of clare constat or vther preceptis of sesing of landis or annuelrentis possessit be thame befoir the space of fourtie yeiris. (Repealed by Prescription and Limitation (Scotland) Act 1973 (c. 52))
Saving the Rights Act 1594 Not public and general	1594 c. 25; 1594 c. 219	8 June 1594
Ratificationis in this parliament to be salvo jure cujuslibet.
Land Purchase Act 1594 still in force	1594 c. 26; 1594 c. 220	8 June 1594
Anent the bying of landis and possessionis dependand in pley be Jugeis or memberis of courtis.
Ejection Caution Act 1594 (repealed)	1594 c. 27; 1594 c. 217	8 June 1594
That cautioun be found in actionis of eiectioun. (Repealed by Bankruptcy and Diligence etc. (Scotland) Act 2007 (asp 3))
Consideration of Articles Act 1594 (repealed)	1594 c. 28; 1594 c. 218	8 June 1594
For consideratioun of articles to be proponit in Parliament. (Repealed by Statute Law Revision (Scotland) Act 1906 (6 Edw. 7. c. 38))
Murder Act 1594 (repealed)	1594 c. 29; 1594 c. 219	8 June 1594
Anent slauchter and trubling of parties in persute and defence of thair actionis. (Repealed by Statute Law Revision (Scotland) Act 1906 (6 Edw. 7. c. 38))
Parricide Act 1594 (repealed)	1594 c. 30; 1594 c. 224	8 June 1594
For punisement of parricide. (Repealed by Succession (Scotland) Act 2016 (asp 7))
Lent Act 1594 (repealed)	1594 c. 31; 1594 c. 225	8 June 1594
Anent the certane tyme of lentren sparing of young flesche in the spring and brekaris of lentren and uther dayis forbiddin to eit flesche. (Repealed by Statute Law Revision (Scotland) Act 1906 (6 Edw. 7. c. 38))
Usary Act 1594 (repealed)	1594 c. 32; 1594 c. 222	8 June 1594
For punischement of committaris of usurie. (Repealed by Statute Law Revision (Scotland) Act 1906 (6 Edw. 7. c. 38))
Student and Bursars Act 1594 (repealed)	1594 c. 33; 1594 c. 223	8 June 1594
For punischement of sum disorderis of studentis and bursaris. (Repealed by Statute Law Revision (Scotland) Act 1906 (6 Edw. 7. c. 38))
Salmon Act 1594 (repealed)	1594 c. 34; 1594 c. 224	8 June 1594
For executioun of the actis anent slauchter of blak or reid fische and fry of salmound. (Repealed by Statute Law Revision (Scotland) Act 1906 (6 Edw. 7. c. 38))
Burghs Act 1594 (repealed)	1594 c. 35; 1594 c. 225	8 June 1594
Anent the privilegis of burrowis. (Repealed by Statute Law Revision (Scotland) Act 1964 (c. 80)
Burghs (No. 2) Act 1594 (repealed)	1594 c. 36; 1594 c. 226	8 June 1594
Anent the uphalding of decayed landis within burgh. (Repealed by Statute Law Revision (Scotland) Act 1964 (c. 80)
Theft Act 1594 (repealed)	1594 c. 37; 1594 c. 231	8 June 1594
For punisement of thift reif oppressioun and sorning. (Repealed by Statute Law Revision (Scotland) Act 1906 (6 Edw. 7. c. 38))
Not public and general	1594 c. 38 —	8 June 1594
Aganis prejudice to the Quenis Majestie in this present Parliament.
Not public and general	1594 c. 39 —	8 June 1594
Act in favour of the ministrie of Glasgow.
Not public and general	1594 c. 40 —	8 June 1594
Act anent the kirk of Brunt Iland.
Not public and general	1594 c. 41 —	8 June 1594
Anent the dispositionis of umquhill Patrik bischoip of Sanctandrois.
Not public and general	1594 c. 42 —	8 June 1594
Anent the kirk of Carraill.
Not public and general	1594 c. 43 —	8 June 1594
Anent the parochin of Inuerkip and kirk of Grenock.
Not public and general	1594 c. 44 —	8 June 1594
Anent the chapell royall of Striviling.
Prelates Act 1594 (repealed)	1594 c. 45; 1594 c. 232	8 June 1594
Prelattis and utheris beneficit personis suld haif releif of thair taxatioun. (Repealed by Statute Law Revision (Scotland) Act 1906 (6 Edw. 7. c. 38))
Not public and general	1594 c. 46 —	8 June 1594
That the temporall landis annexit to the croun sall remane thairwith and that thai salbe retourit.
Skinners Act 1594 (repealed)	c. 47 —	8 June 1594
Act in fauour of the skynnaris. (Repealed by Statute Law Revision (Scotland) Act 1906 (6 Edw. 7. c. 38))
Not public and general	1594 c. 48 —	8 June 1594
Anent the dissolutioun of the kirk of Nether Airlie.
Not public and general	1594 c. 49 —	8 June 1594
Act in favour of the bischoip of Dunkeld.
Not public and general	1594 c. 50 —	8 June 1594
Act in favour of the bischoip of Abirdene.
Not public and general	1594 c. 51 —	8 June 1594
Act in favour of Mr Williame Melvill anent Kilwynning.
Not public and general	1594 c. 52 —	8 June 1594
Act in favour of the new college of Sanctandrois.
Not public and general	1594 c. 53 —	8 June 1594
Act in favour of the provest of Lincluden collectour general of the thriddis.
Not public and general	1594 c. 54 —	8 June 1594
Ratificatioun in favour of David Seytoun Parbroith comptroller.
Not public and general	1594 c. 55 —	8 June 1594
Act in favour of the burgh of Linlithgw.
Not public and general	1594 c. 56 —	8 June 1594
Act in favour of the citie of Glasgow.
Not public and general	1594 c. 57 —	8 June 1594
Act in favour of the burgh of Kinghorne.
Not public and general	1594 c. 58 —	8 June 1594
Act in favour of the burgh of Cannowgait.
Not public and general	1594 c. 59 —	8 June 1594
Anent the fair of Baithcatt.
Not public and general	1594 c. 60 —	8 June 1594
Act in favour of the erll of Murray.
Not public and general	1594 c. 61 —	8 June 1594
Act in favour of the lord Fleming.
Not public and general	1594 c. 62 —	8 June 1594
Act in favour of the lord Levingstoun.
Not public and general	1594 c. 63 —	8 June 1594
Act in favoure of the countes of Mar.
Not public and general	1594 c. 64 —	8 June 1594
Act in favour of the laird of Maw.
Not public and general	1594 c. 65 —	8 June 1594
Act in favour of M_{r} George Young.
Not public and general	1594 c. 66 —	8 June 1594
Act in favour of Johnne Andro.
Not public and general	1594 c. 67 —	8 June 1594
Act in favour of Johnne Achesoun.
Not public and general	1594 c. 68 —	8 June 1594
Act in favour of James Smyth and Johnne Walwoid citienaris of Sanctandrois.
Not public and general	1594 c. 69 —	8 June 1594
Act in favour of Robert Abircrummy.
Not public and general	1594 c. 70 —	8 June 1594
Act in favour of the fewaris of the Kingis propirtie in Fyff.
Not public and general	1594 c. 71 —	8 June 1594
Act in favour of Thomas Fowlis.
Not public and general	1594 c. 72 —	8 June 1594
Aganis the exemptioun of Nicoll Uduart burges of Edinburgh.
Not public and general	1594 c. 73 —	8 June 1594
Anent the brig of Dalkeith.
Currency Act 1594 (repealed)	1594 c. 74 —	8 June 1594
Ratificatioun of the act and contract anent the cunyie. (Repealed by Statute Law Revision (Scotland) Act 1906 (6 Edw. 7. c. 38))
Bullion Act 1594 (repealed)	1594 c. 75; 1594 c. 206	8 June 1594
Ratificatioun of the act anent the bulyeoun. (Repealed by Statute Law Revision (Scotland) Act 1906 (6 Edw. 7. c. 38))
Forestallers Act 1594 (repealed)	1594 c. 76 —	8 June 1594
Ratificatioun of the actis anent regrattaris and foirstallaris. (Repealed by Statute Law Revision (Scotland) Act 1906 (6 Edw. 7. c. 38))
Caution for Exchequer Accounts Act 1594 (repealed)	1594 c. 77; 1594 c. 230	8 June 1594
Off the panes of thame that makis nocht thair comptis tymouslie in the chekker. (Repealed by Statute Law Revision (Scotland) Act 1906 (6 Edw. 7. c. 38))
Not public and general	1594 c. 78 —	8 June 1594
Ratificatioun to the burgh of Abirdene.
Not public and general	1594 c. 79 —	8 June 1594
Ratificatioun to the bruch in barronie of Turreff.
Not public and general	1594 c. 80 —	8 June 1594
Ratificatioun of the Kingis Majesties acquittances to the burrow of Dundie.
Not public and general	1594 c. 81 —	8 June 1594
Ratificatioun to the duik of Lennox.
Not public and general	1594 c. 82 —	8 June 1594
Ratificatioun to the erll of Mar.
Not public and general	1594 c. 83 —	8 June 1594
Ratificatioun to Dauid Seytoun of Parbroith comptroller.
Not public and general	1594 c. 84 —	8 June 1594
Ratificatioun to the clerk of register and M^{r} Johne Hay his sone.
Not public and general	1594 c. 85 —	8 June 1594
Ratificatioun to M^{r} Peter Young.
Not public and general	1594 c. 86 —	8 June 1594
Ratificatioun to the laird of Drumlangrig.
Not public and general	1594 c. 87 —	8 June 1594
Ratificatioun of the constable of Dundie.
Not public and general	1594 c. 88 —	8 June 1594
Ratificatioun to David Scrymgeour of Fordye.
Not public and general	1594 c. 89 —	8 June 1594
Ratificatioun to Johnne Hay of Lochloy.
Not public and general	1594 c. 90 —	8 June 1594
Ratificatioun to Johnne Arnote.
Not public and general	1594 c. 91 —	8 June 1594
Ratificatioun to capitane Patrik Cranstoun.
Not public and general	1594 c. 92 —	8 June 1594
Ratificatioun to Mr Henrie Keir.
Not public and general	1594 c. 93 —	8 June 1594
Ratificatioun to George Halliburtoun and his wyff.
Not public and general	1594 c. 94 —	8 June 1594
Ratificatioun to the clerk of register of the chaiplanis chalmeris of Abirdene.
Not public and general	1594 c. 95 —	8 June 1594
Ratificatioun to the commendater of Pettinweyme.
Not public and general	1594 c. 96 —	8 June 1594
Ratificatioun to Patrik Hwme of Polwart and Patrik Murray.
Not public and general	1594 c. 97 —	8 June 1594
Prouisionis in favouris of burghis erectit sen the act of annexatioun.
Hospitals Act 1594 (repealed)	1594 c. 98 —	8 June 1594
Anent hospitallis and schoolis. About hospitals and schools. (Repealed by Statute Law Revision (Scotland) Act 1906 (6 Edw. 7. c. 38))
Not public and general	1594 c. 99 —	8 June 1594
Exceptionis fra the act intitulat Annulling of pensionis furth of the erectionis sene the annexatioun.
Not public and general	1594 c. 100	8 June 1594
Exceptionis fra the general act of dissolutioun.

=== Sources ===
- Alexander, William (1841). "Acta Parliamentorum Regis Jacobi Sexti". An Abridgement of the Acts of the Parliaments of Scotland. Edinburgh: Adam and Charles Black. pp. A35 – A36 – via Google Books.
- Alexander, William (1841). "Acta Parliamentorum Regis Jacobi Sexti". An Abridgement of the Acts of the Parliaments of Scotland. Edinburgh: Adam and Charles Black. pp. A35 – A36 – via Google Books.
- Chronological Table of the Statutes. London: Her Majesty's Stationery Office. 1972. pp. 1343–1344 – via Google Books.
- "Acts of the Old Scottish Parliament: 1594". legislation.gov.uk. The National Archives.
- "Index of Statutes: James VI (1567-1625)". Records of the Parliaments of Scotland to 1707. University of St Andrews.

== See also ==
- List of legislation in the United Kingdom
- Records of the Parliaments of Scotland
