= Bankruptcy in the United Kingdom =

Bankruptcy in the United Kingdom is divided into separate local regimes for England and Wales, for Northern Ireland, and for Scotland. There is also a UK insolvency law which applies across the United Kingdom, since bankruptcy refers only to insolvency of individuals and partnerships. Other procedures, for example administration and liquidation, apply to insolvent companies. However, the term 'bankruptcy' is often used when referring to insolvent companies in the general media.

== Bankruptcy in England and Wales ==
In England and Wales, bankruptcy is governed by Part IX of the Insolvency Act 1986 (as amended) and by the Insolvency Rules 1986 (SI 1986/1925) (as amended). The term bankruptcy applies only to individuals, not to companies or other legal entities.

An individual may be made bankrupt only by court order following the presentation of a bankruptcy petition. An individual may present his own petition on the ground that he is insolvent, i.e. unable to pay his debts. A creditor or creditors may also petition for a bankruptcy order to be made against an individual debtor.

Before a creditor presents a bankruptcy petition he must usually first serve on the debtor a statutory demand in one of the prescribed forms requiring the debtor to pay the sum claimed within 21 days of service of the demand. The debtor may apply to the court to set aside the demand on the basis that the debt is disputed on bona fide grounds or that he has a counterclaim, set off or cross-demand which equals or exceeds the amount of the debt claimed by the creditor. If the debtor fails to pay the sum claimed in the demand or to apply to set aside the demand or if his application to set aside the demand is dismissed by the court, the creditor may present a bankruptcy petition. Alternatively, a creditor may petition without first serving a demand if execution on a judgment has failed. In either case the debtor must owe the creditor at least £5000 and the claim must be for a liquidated sum, i.e. a fixed sum of money (not, for example, damages).

A bankruptcy petition must generally be served on the debtor personally, but if the creditor is unable to effect service, either because the debtor has evaded service or cannot be traced, the court may order substituted service, i.e. service by post or some other method which is likely to bring the demand to the debtor's attention.

At the hearing of the petition the court may make a bankruptcy order if the debt is undisputed or not capable of being disputed, dismiss the petition (for example if the debt has been paid) or adjourn the petition to give the debtor time to pay.

If a bankruptcy order is made the administration of the bankrupt person's affairs is handled by a trustee in bankruptcy who must be either an official receiver (a civil servant) or a licensed insolvency practitioner appointed either by the Secretary of State or by the creditors at a meeting called for that purpose. The bankrupt's assets (excluding tools of his trade and other essentials) vest in his trustee who is obliged to realise them (generally by selling them) to pay a dividend to creditors.

A bankrupt person is subject to certain restrictions, principally that he may not raise credit without informing the person from whom he is borrowing that he is a bankrupt, and that he may not act as a director of a company. He is also subject to obligations to give information to his trustee and to cooperate with him in the administration of his affairs. Extensive powers are available to enable the court to compel the bankrupt to do so. Similarly the court has power to undo a range of transactions entered into by the bankrupt with a view to dissipating or reducing the value of his assets in the period before his bankruptcy.

Following the coming into force of the Enterprise Act 2002's bankruptcy provisions in April 2004, an England & Wales bankruptcy will now normally last no longer than 12 months and maybe fewer, if the official receiver files in Court a certificate that his investigations are complete. At the end of that period the bankrupt is discharged and ceases to be liable for bankruptcy debts. However, in cases where the bankrupt is considered culpable for their insolvency, a bankruptcy restrictions order may be made, extending some of the restrictions of bankruptcy for up to 15 years.

As an alternative to bankruptcy, a debtor may propose an individual voluntary arrangement (IVA) to his creditors (see Part VIII of the Insolvency Act 1986) or a debt relief order if debts do not exceed a certain threshold. An IVA takes the form of a proposal to creditors to pay some or all of the debtor's debts over a period of time by selling assets or making payment out of income or a combination of the two. The proposal must be approved by a licensed insolvency practitioner who will convene a meeting of creditors to consider it. Approval requires a majority vote in value in excess of 75%. If the proposal is approved it binds all the debtor's creditors whether or not they have voted in favour of it.

In theory, it is also open to a debtor to make a proposal to his creditors by deed of arrangement under the Deeds of Arrangement Act 1914, but this procedure has fallen into disuse since the introduction of voluntary arrangements under the Insolvency Act 1986.

== Insolvency statistics for England and Wales ==
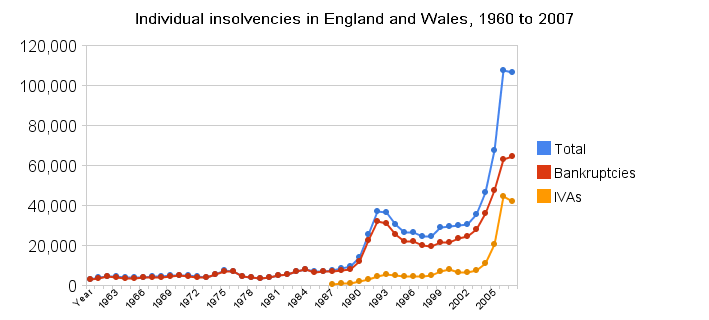

Individual insolvencies in England and Wales, 1997 to 2010
Year	Total	Bankruptcies	Debt Relief Orders	IVAs
1997	24,441	19,892		4,545
1998	24,549	19,647		4,901
1999	28,806	21,611		7,195
2000	29,528	21,550		7,978
2001	29,775	23,477		6,298
2002	30,587	24,292		6,295
2003	35,604	28,021		7,583
2004	46,650	35,898		10,751
2005	67,584	47,291		20,293
2006	107,288	62,956		44,332
2007	106,645	64,480		42,165
2008	106,544	67,428		39,116
2009	134,142	74,670	11,831	47,641
2010	135,045	59,173	25,179	50,693

- Source: The Insolvency Service

== Bankruptcy in Scotland ==
Bankruptcy in Scotland is called sequestration and the organisation responsible for administering these processes is the Accountant in Bankruptcy. There are alternatives to bankruptcy that can help individuals deal with debt problems, these include the Debt Arrangement Scheme. Other options include protected trust deeds, these are agreements arranged between the individual in debt and his or her creditors. There are organisations that give free professional advice to individuals experiencing problems with debt, these include Citizens Advice Scotland.

== See also ==
- UK insolvency law
- Enterprise Act 2002
- Debt Relief Order
- Bill Chamber
- Accountant of Court
- Court of Session
- Diligence (Scots law)
- Reconstruction (law)
- Protected Trust Deed
- Sequestration (law)
- Scheme of arrangement
- Institute of Chartered Accountants of Scotland
- Insolvency Practitioners Association
- Debtors (Scotland) Act 1838
