= Debt relief order =

Debt relief orders (DROs) are a simplified, quicker and cheaper alternative to bankruptcy as an insolvency measure in the United Kingdom. They came into effect in England and Wales on 6 April 2009, and are also offered in Northern Ireland.

Debt relief orders are suitable for debtors who have relatively low liabilities, little surplus income and few assets. Depending on eligibility, they can be a viable alternative to other insolvency measures, such as Individual Voluntary Arrangements (IVAs), and when bankruptcy would be disproportionate. Vulnerable people trapped in debt may be able to have a fresh start.

It is possible to apply for a DRO without attending court. There is a fee of £90 to obtain a DRO in Northern Ireland, which may be paid by installments prior to applying for the order. As part of the 2024 United Kingdom budget, the application fee was abolished in England and Wales effective 6 April 2024; DROs may now be obtained in that jurisdiction without charge.

== Background ==
Debt relief orders were introduced under Chapter 4 of the Tribunals, Courts and Enforcement Act 2007, as a major amendment to the Insolvency Act 1986, and minor amendments to the Company Directors Disqualification Act 1986 and the Employment Rights Act 1996.

In Schedule 20 of the Tribunals, Courts and Enforcement Act 2007, the consequences of debt relief orders is outlined.

Consequences of the amendments to the Insolvency Act 1986 include:

- bankruptcy or eligibility for a debt relief order could be determined by a third party intermediary;
- debt relief orders were outlined as a voluntary process which third party mediators could not intermediary;
- debt relief orders can be revoked if the £90 application fee is not paid;
- individuals who successfully complete a DRO process are not eligible for Parliament for 12 months;
- additional restrictions to individuals who complete a DRO process outlined;
- individuals who are dead are exempt from DRO protections;
- a register of DROs established, can be inspected by the public;
- punishments for abuse of DRO process for monetary gain of an individual and/or organisation outlined.

Consequences of the amendments to the Company Directors Disqualification Act 1986 include:

- an individual directly or indirectly promoting, establishing, or managing a company during the period of DRO restrictions is an offence (punishment defined as the same as for that offence under bankruptcy restrictions).

Consequences of the amendments to the Employment Rights Act 1996 include:

- an employer is defined as being insolvent during the period of DRO restrictions.

The Minimal Asset Protection (MAP) insolvency measure, introduced in Scotland under the Bankruptcy and Debt Advice (Scotland) Bill on 11 June 2013, shares similarities with DROs but has different associated benefits, risks, and fees. In particular, the application cost was reduced from £90 to £50 during the COVID-19 pandemic (until September 31, 2020) in response to increased financial insecurity.

== Eligibility ==
Debt relief orders are intended to provide debt relief for people in England, Wales, and Northern Ireland if:

- the debtor is unable to pay his/her debts;
- the debtor's total unsecured liabilities (debt) must not exceed £50,000;
- have savings or valuable items worth less than £2,000 in total (this includes houses so homeowners will not be eligible)
- own a vehicle worth less than £4,000 (if you were to sell it today); the debtor will usually be allowed to keep a car if it is worth less than £4000 or it has been adapted for them because they have a physical impairment that has a substantial and long-term adverse effect on their ability to carry out normal day-to-day activities;
- the debtor's disposable income, following deduction of normal household expenses, must not exceed £75 per month;
- the debtor must be domiciled in England or Wales, or in the last three years have been resident or carrying on business in England or Wales;
- the debtor must not have previously been subject to a DRO within the last 6 years;
- the debtor must not be involved in another formal insolvency procedure at the time of application for a DRO, such as:
  - an undischarged bankrupt;
  - a current individual voluntary arrangement;
  - a current bankruptcy restrictions order or undertaking;
  - a current debt relief restrictions order or undertaking;
  - an interim order;
  - a current pending debtor's bankruptcy petition in relation to the debtor but the debtor has not been referred to the DRO procedure by the court as a more suitable method of debt relief;
  - a current pending creditor's bankruptcy petition against the debtor but the debtor has not obtained the creditor's permission for entry into the DRO process.

== Application process ==
A debt relief order is a form of insolvency, like bankruptcy, and will be subject to a public listing through the Insolvency Service website.

Debt relief orders can only be completed by an approved intermediary and competent authorities. Approved intermediaries will be mainly experienced debt advisors attached to debt advice organisations such as Citizens Advice, StepChange Debt Charity, Think Money or an AdviceUK member. The approved intermediary can review the persons information, make a determination that they are eligible and appropriate for a DRO and file the DRO application online. Approved intermediaries will not charge a fee for completing or submitting an application although a fee will be payable to the Insolvency Service.

The full list of organisations approved by the Insolvency Service as competent authorities are listed on the .Gov.UK web site.

Upon receipt of the application and payment of the fee, an Official Receiver may make the order, administratively, without the involvement of the court if it appears that the applicant meets the requirements.

If the Official Receiver becomes aware of information which means the debtor does not qualify for a DRO, the application will be refused. If this information comes to light after the DRO is made, the Official Receiver may revoke the DRO without reference to the Court. The effect of revoking a DRO will be to leave the debtor open to actions by his or her creditors. If a DRO is revoked the debtor cannot apply for another one within six years.

== Outcomes ==
During the 12-month period that a debt relief order is active, the applicant will be:

- protected from enforcement action by the creditors included in the application (bar certain creditors whose debts cannot be scheduled in the DRO and those creditors whose debts are included in the DRO but who have successfully obtained leave from the court to pursue their debts);
- free from those debts at the end of the period (normally 12 months from Order);
- obliged to provide information to and co-operate with the Official Receiver;
- expected to make arrangements to repay their creditors should their financial circumstances improve.

Certain activities by debtors subject to a DRO may result in an application to the Court for a Debt Relief Restrictions Order being refused. These include:

- failing to keep records which account for a loss of property by the debtor, or by a business carried on by him, where the loss occurred in the period beginning two years before the application date for the debt relief order and ending with the date of the application for the debt relief restrictions order;
- failing to produce records of that kind on demand by the official receiver;
- entering into a transaction at an undervalue in the period beginning two years before the application date for the debt relief order and ending with the date of the determination of that application;
- giving a preference in the period beginning two years before the application date for the debt relief order and ending with the date of the determination of that application;
- making an excessive pension contribution;
- a failure to supply goods or services that were wholly or partly paid for;
- trading at a time, before the date of the determination of the application for the debt relief order, when the debtor knew or ought to have known that he was himself to be unable to pay his debts;
- incurring, before the date of the determination of the application for the debt relief order, a debt which the debtor had no reasonable expectation of being able to pay;
- failing to account satisfactorily to the court or the official receiver for a loss of property or for an insufficiency of property to meet his debts;
- carrying on any gambling, rash and hazardous speculation or unreasonable extravagance which may have materially contributed to or increased the extent of his inability to pay his debts before the application date for the debt relief order or which took place between that date and the date of the determination of the application for the debt relief order;
- neglect of business affairs of a kind which may have materially contributed to or increased the extent of his inability to pay his debts;
- fraud or fraudulent breach of trust;
- failing to co-operate with the official receiver.

In addition certain more serious misconduct may result in criminal prosecution.

Data released in November 2014 showed the number of debt relief orders in London between 2009 and 2013 was much lower than the average for the rest of England. The study was produced by New Policy Institute and funded by Trust for London.

== See also ==
- Simplified Individual Voluntary Arrangement
- Bankruptcy
- Liquidations
- Administrations
- Administrative Receiverships
- Trust Deeds (only available in Scotland)
