= Court of Session Act 1810 =

Act of the Parliament of the United Kingdom

Court of Session Act 1810 (Note: The citation of this act by this short title was authorised by section 1 of, and the first schedule to, the Short Titles Act 1896. Due to the repeal of those provisions it is now authorised by section 19(2) of the Interpretation Act 1978.)
- Act of Parliament
- Parliament of the United Kingdom
- Long title: An Act for abridging the form of extracting Decrees of the Court of Session in Scotland, and for the Regulation of certain Parts of the Proceedings of that Court.
- Citation: 50 Geo. 3. c. 112
- Territorial extent: United Kingdom

Dates
- Royal assent: 20 June 1810
- Commencement: 20 June 1810 (Note: Section 1.)
- Repealed: 29 September 1988
Other legislation
Amended by	Statute Law Revision Act 1872 (No. 2); Statute Law Revision Act 1888; Administration of Justice (Scotland) Act 1933
Repealed by	Court of Session Act 1988
Relates to	Court of Session Act 1808; Administration of Justice (Scotland) Act 1809; Court of Session Act 1813

Status: Repealed

Text of statute as originally enacted

The Court of Session Act 1810 (50 Geo. 3. c. 112) was an act of the Parliament of the United Kingdom (50 Geo. 3. c. 112) reforming Scotland's highest court, the Court of Session. This Act was a follow-up Act to the Court of Session Act 1808 (48 Geo. 3. c. 151) in reforming the Court of Session, creating the two divisions known as the Inner House and the Outer House.

== Subsequent developments ==
Reform continued with the Court of Session Act 1813 (53 Geo. 3. c. 64) which created the final form of the Outer House, and the Jury Trials (Scotland) Act 1815 (55 Geo. 3. c. 42) which introduced trial by jury.

The whole act was repealed by section 52(2) of, and part I of schedule 2 to, the Court of Session Act 1988, which came into force on 29 September 1988.
