= AdviceUK =

AdviceUK is a membership body for organisations and services that provide free and independent advice across England, Scotland and Wales and a charity registered with the Charity Commission. Typically its members are charities and community groups that work in a particular geographical location or with a clearly defined client group.

It was formed in 1979 as the Federation of Independent Advice Centres (FIAC).

AdviceUK is a member of the Advice Services Alliance and has been designated as a Competent Authority to administer Debt Relief Orders.

It is also listed as an umbrella body for not-for-profit providers of generalist or specialist social welfare advice.
