= March 2024 United Kingdom budget =

- Presented: 6 March 2024
- Country: United Kingdom
- Parliament: 58th
- Party: Conservative Party
- Chancellor: Jeremy Hunt

The March 2024 United Kingdom budget was delivered to the House of Commons by Jeremy Hunt, the Chancellor of the Exchequer, on 6 March 2024. It was the second budget presented by Hunt since his appointment as Chancellor, the last to be delivered during his tenure as chancellor and the last budget to be presented by the Conservative government of Rishi Sunak before the party was defeated by Labour in the 2024 general election. This is the most recent budget to have been presented by the Conservative party. It was held three weeks after official figures revealed that the country had entered a shallow recession.

In the budget, Hunt abolished the non-dom tax status, reduced employee's national insurance by 2%, froze alcohol and fuel duties, increased tobacco and vapes duties, extended the oil and gas windfall tax, increased the child benefit threshold, announced further energy measures, announced further levelling-up funding, reduced capital gains tax by 4%, extended the Household Support Fund and increased the VAT threshold to £90,000 for small businesses, and kept income tax personal allowances at the same level (fiscal drag).

The Budget announced the "biggest ever funding boost from government" for renewable energy. Further funding for science and technology investment were announced, with more investment to come from the private sector. The budget announced more measures to protect farmers with the agricultural property relief.

== Background ==
The date of the March 2024 budget was confirmed by HM Treasury on 27 December 2023. It was the last budget to be presented before the next general election.

During the 2023 autumn statement, Hunt reduced National Insurance by 2% and announced tax relief for businesses. In January 2024 he hinted that he may seek to announce further tax cuts in the forthcoming budget, describing countries with lower taxes as having more "dynamic, faster growing economies". But suggested a few weeks later there was likely to be less scope for tax cuts in the budget than had been the case during the 2023 autumn statement.

On 23 January 2024, data from the Office for National Statistics indicated government borrowing in December 2023 was almost £5bn lower than had been forecast by the Office for Budget Responsibility. Borrowing for the nine months up to December 2023 was £119.1bn, £11.1bn more than during the same period for 2022, but lower than the £123.9bn predicted by the OBR. Moreover, the data showed that borrowing for the month of December 2023 was £7.8bn, a fall from £16.2bn in December 2022, and the lowest monthly figure since 2019. This prompted analysts, including Ruth Gregory, deputy chief UK economist at Capital Economics, to suggest the Chancellor would have room to make potential tax cuts. But the Institute for Fiscal Studies warned the UK was facing its worst economic situation since the 1950s, and said any promise of tax cuts may have to be postponed, while the International Monetary Fund (IMF) "advised the UK against further tax cuts" during its assessment of the world economy. The IFS also warned that the government should not make tax cuts unless it could explain how they would be financed. On the weekend before the budget, Hunt told the BBC he wanted to move towards a low-tax economy but would do so in a responsible way.

Official figures released on 15 February indicated the UK had entered recession, after the economy shrank by 0.3% between October and December, having already contracted between July and September 2023.

== The statement ==
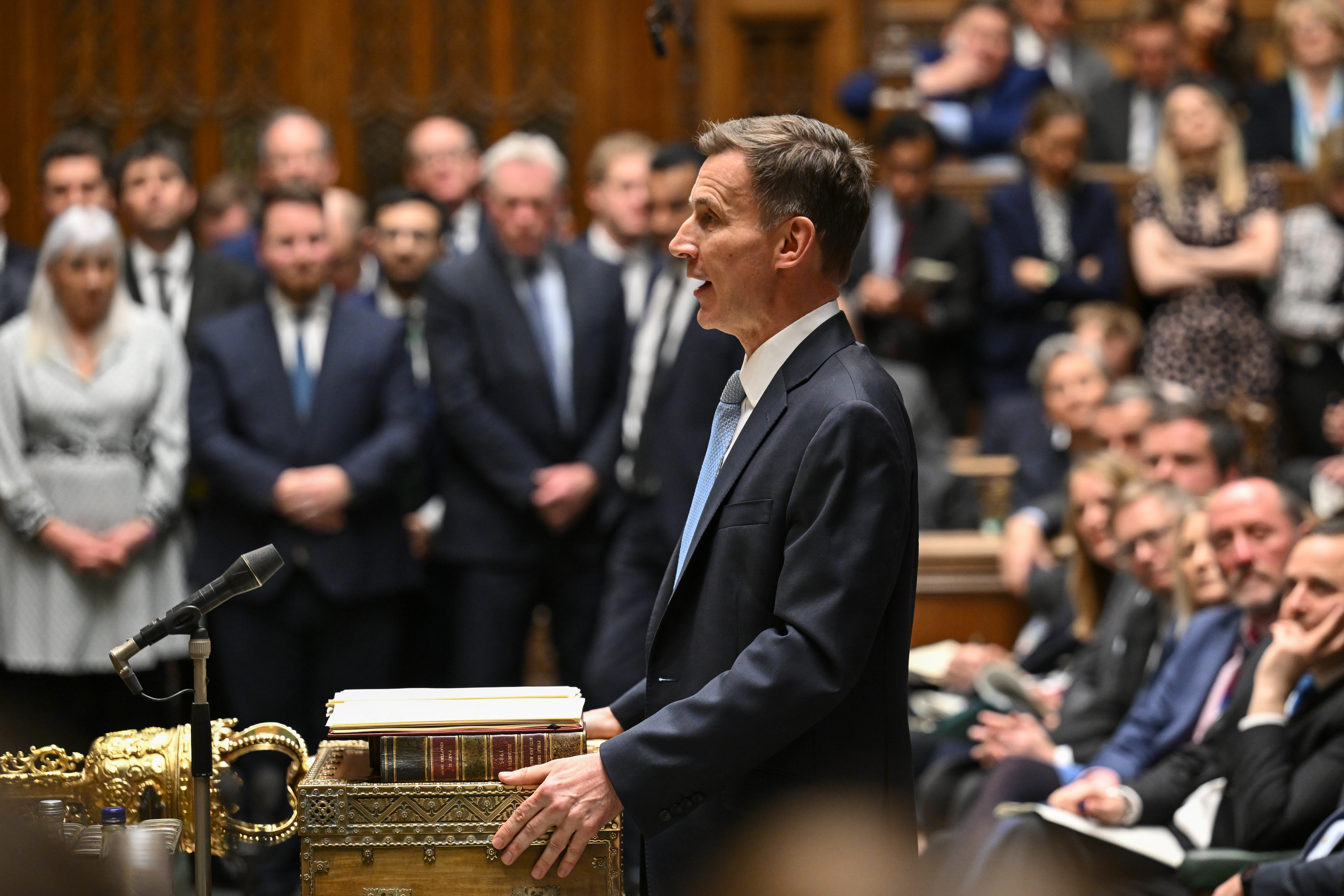
Hunt presenting the budget to the House, on the 6 March 2024

During his statement, Hunt confirmed that the Office for Budget Responsibility had predicted UK economy would grow by 0.8% in 2024 and 1.9% in 2025. Economic growth was forecast to be 2% for 2026, 1.8% for 2027 and 1.7% for 2028, while the UK's rate of inflation was estimated to fall below the Bank of England's 2% target by the end of June 2024, and would then fall to 1.5% in 2025. Public debt, excluding Bank of England debt, was forecast to be 91.7% of GDP in 2024, rising to 92.8% in 2025. Overall day-to-day government spending was forecast to increase by 1% in real terms over the next five years.

=== Key points ===
- National Insurance contributions reduced by 2% to 8% from 6 April.
- Salary thresholds for income tax and National Insurance frozen, leading to fiscal drag when wages rise.
- Non-dom tax status to be phased out from April 2025.
- Establishment of a £5,000 UK ISA tax allowance for savers investing in "UK-focused" shares.
- The threshold at which small businesses must register to pay VAT increased from £85,000 to £90,000 from April 2024.
- Extension of the COVID-19-era government loan scheme for small businesses until 2026.
- Tax reliefs for touring and orchestral productions, scheduled to end in March 2025, made permanent.
- £370m increase in spending for Scotland, Wales and Northern Ireland reflecting increases for England.
- NHS budget to increase by £2.5bn in 2025, with the NHS receiving £3.4bn up to 2030 to improve productivity.
- Increase in the cut-off point for child benefit eligibility for a household's highest earner from £50,000 to £60,000.
- Households with highest earner up to £80,000 to be entitled to partial child benefit.
- Benefit claimants who need to take out an emergency loan from the government will be given longer to repay it.
- Extension of the Household Support Fund, the government's cost of living fund, for a further six months. (Note: The Household Support Fund was established on 30 September 2021, making funds available to local Councils in England to distribute to families and households in financial need. This funding covered the period 6 October 2021 to 31 March 2022 initially. It was later extended in successive stages to 31 March 2024 and the March 2024 budget further extended it to 30 September 2024. The availability of the fund was later extended to 31 March 2026.)
- The £90 administration fee to obtain a debt relief order is scrapped.
- End of windfall tax on energy companies extended from 2028 to 2029.
- £160m deal announced for UK government to purchase site of planned Wylfa nuclear power station in north Wales.
- A further £120m announced for a government fund that invests in green energy projects.
- Tax breaks scrapped for owners of holiday let properties.
- Stamp duty tax breaks for the purchase of multiple properties to end in June 2024.
- Higher rate of tax on property sales reduced from 28% to 24%.
- Announcement of an increase in Air Passenger Duty for business class tickets.
- Duty on fuel frozen, with 5p cut in petrol and diesel duty extended for a further year.
- Extension of the excise duty freeze on alcohol from August 2024 to April 2025.
- A new tax announced for vaping products to be introduced from October 2026.
- Duty on 100 cigarettes to rise by £2.00 from October 2026 to ensure vaping remains cheaper.
- £1m announced for a memorial to honour Muslims who fought for the UK during World War I and World War II.
- A new tax credit scheme announced for UK independent films with a budget of less than £15m.

== Subsequent events ==
The March 2024 budget was the final budget statement to be presented before that year's general election, which was won by the Labour Party. It subsequently emerged that HM Treasury had overspend by £9.5bn in the run up to the budget, something that led Rachel Reeves, who replaced Hunt as Chancellor following the election, to claim the Conservatives had left a "hole" in the public finances. On 5 November, the Office for Budget Responsibility ruled that HM Treasury should have disclosed the overspend "by law".
