= Interdicts in Scots law =

Concept in Scots law

In Scots law, an interdict is a court order to stop someone from breaching someone else's rights. They can be issued by the Court of Session or a Sheriff Court. The equivalent term in England is an injunction. A temporary interdict is called an interim interdict. A court will grant an interim interdict if there is a prima facie case and on the balance of convenience the remedy should be granted. Breaching an interdict can result in a fine or imprisonment.

== See also ==
- Injunction
- Super-injunctions in English law
