= Inner House =

Senior Scottish court

Inner House of the Court of Session
- Scottish version of the Royal Court of Arms as used by the Courts in Scotland
- Interactive map of Inner House of the Court of Session
- 55.949°N 3.191°W
- Established: 1810; 216 years ago
- Jurisdiction: Scotland
- Location: Parliament House, Edinburgh
- Coordinates: 55.949°N 3.191°W
- Composition method: Appointed by Scottish Ministers on joint recommendation of the Lord President and Lord Justice Clerk
- Authorised by: Court of Session Act 1810 and Court of Session Act 1988
- Appeals to: Supreme Court of the United Kingdom
- Judge term length: Compulsory retirement at age of 75
- Number of positions: 12, by Court of Session 1988
- Website: www.scotcourts.gov.uk

Lord President of the Court of Session
- Currently: Paul Cullen, Lord Pentland
- Since: 3 February 2025

Lord Justice Clerk
- Currently: John Beckett, Lord Beckett
- Since: 4 February 2025

The Inner House is the senior part of the Court of Session, the supreme civil court in Scotland; the Outer House forms the junior part of the Court of Session. It is a court of appeal and a court of first instance. The chief justice is the Lord President, with their deputy being the Lord Justice Clerk, and judges of the Inner House are styled Senators of the College of Justice or Lords of Council and Session. Criminal appeals in Scotland are handled by the High Court of Justiciary sitting as the Court of Appeal.

The Inner House is the part of the Court of Session which acts as a court of appeal for cases from the Outer House and from appeals in civil cases from the Court of the Lord Lyon, Scottish Land Court, and the Lands Tribunal for Scotland. It will hear appeals on questions of law from the Sheriff Appeal Court. It will also sit as a court of first instance in rare instances. The Inner House is always a panel of at least three senators and does not sit with a jury.

The division of the Court into two houses was first enacted by the Court of Session Act 1810 and most recently confirmed by the Court of Session Act 1988.

== Remit and jurisdiction ==
=== First instance jurisdiction ===
The Inner House will sit as a court of first instance in respect of special cases, where the facts are not disputed but where a significant legal difficulty has arisen. Such a case may be appealed to another panel of the Inner House, but constituted with a greater number of senators than the initial panel. Further appeals are also possible to the Supreme Court of the United Kingdom.

=== Appellate jurisdiction ===
Almost all hearings in the Inner House are before three judges, although in important cases in which there is a conflict of authority a court of five judges or, exceptionally, seven, may be convened. The Inner House is sub-divided into two divisions of equal authority and jurisdiction - the First Division, headed by the Lord President; and the Second Division headed by the Lord Justice Clerk. The courts to hear each case are, ordinarily, drawn from these divisions. When neither is available to chair a hearing, an Extra Division of three senators is summoned, chaired by the most senior judge present; due to pressure of business this Extra Division sits frequently nowadays.

The appellate jurisdiction of the Inner House was substantially altered by the Courts Reform (Scotland) Act 2014 which created the Sheriff Appeal Court, which now sees civil appeals being heard by an Appeal Sheriff sitting in the Sheriff Appeal Court. Such appeals are binding on all sheriff courts in Scotland, and appeals can only be remitted (transferred) to the Inner House where they are deemed to be of wider public interest, raise a significant point of law, or are particularly complex:

... the rationale for the establishment of the Sheriff Appeal Court, that it will deal with virtually all civil appeals from the sheriff court because these do not merit the attention of Inner House judges except in very exceptional cases. This will free up Inner House judges to deal with more complex matters.

— Scottish Government, Paragraph 133, Policy Memorandum, Courts Reform (Scotland) Bill

Section 48 of the Courts Reform (Scotland) Act 2014 establishes the precedent of judgments in the Sheriff Appeal Court, so that when the Sheriff Appeal Court makes a decision on a question of law, it is binding in every sheriffdom for every sheriff court and every justice of the peace court. The decision is also binding on the Sheriff Appeal Court, unless it convenes a bench with a greater number of Appeal Sheriffs than the original court.

== Appeals to the Supreme Court of the United Kingdom ==
Unlike the High Court of Justiciary, which deals with Scottish criminal cases, and whose decisions cannot in general be appealed beyond Scotland, appeals could be taken from the Court of Session to the Supreme Court of the United Kingdom. The constitutional settlement introduced by the Scotland Act 1998 further provided that, in cases where a 'devolution issue' arose, an appeal would lie, and the Inner House can remit a case, to the Judicial Committee of the Privy Council. Both these types of appeal will go instead to the new Supreme Court of the United Kingdom from 2009.

It was formerly argued that the Act of Union 1707 expressly forbade appeals from the Court of Session to the House of Lords. Throughout the eighteenth and nineteenth centuries this was a matter of great concern, as Scottish cases were typically decided by Law Lords with no background in Scots Law. In modern times, the few cases which were so appealed were heard by a judicial committee of five which included at least two senior Scottish judges, but the existence of this right of appeal has been criticised. This debate also spilled into the debate as to whether the judicial functions of the House of Lords and Privy Council should be consolidated in a new Supreme Court of the United Kingdom. The ability to appeal to the House of Lords was confirmed by the Court of Session Act 1988.

== See also ==
- Court of Appeal of England and Wales
