= Court of Session Act 1988 =

Act of the Parliament of the United Kingdom

Court of Session Act 1988 (Note: Section 53(1).)
- Act of Parliament
- Parliament of the United Kingdom
- Long title: An Act to consolidate, with amendments to give effect to recommendations of the Scottish Law Commission, certain enactments relating to the constitution, administration and procedure of the Court of Session and procedure on appeal therefrom to the House of Lords; and to repeal, in accordance with recommendations of the Scottish Law Commission, certain enactments relating to the aforesaid matters which are no longer of practical utility.
- Citation: 1988 c. 36
- Territorial extent: Scotland (Note: Section 53(3).)

Dates
- Royal assent: 29 July 1988
- Commencement: 29 September 1988 (Note: Section 53(2).)

Other legislation
- Amends: See § Repealed enactments
- Repeals/revokes: See § Repealed enactments
- Amended by: Law Reform (Miscellaneous Provisions) (Scotland) Act 1990; Children (Scotland) Act 1995; Maximum Number of Judges (Scotland) Order 1999; Scotland Act 1998 (Consequential Modifications) (No.1) Order 1999; Scotland Act 1998 (Consequential Modifications) (No.2) Order 1999; Agricultural Holdings (Scotland) Act 2003; Vulnerable Witnesses (Scotland) Act 2004; Maximum Number of Judges (Scotland) Order 2004; Constitutional Reform Act 2005; Family Law (Scotland) Act 2006; Number of Inner House Judges (Variation) Order 2007; Judiciary and Courts (Scotland) Act 2008; Legal Services (Scotland) Act 2010; Number of Inner House Judges (Variation) Order 2010; Scottish Civil Justice Council and Criminal Legal Assistance Act 2013; Courts Reform (Scotland) Act 2014; Courts Reform (Scotland) Act 2014 (Consequential Provisions No. 2) Order 2015; Courts Reform (Scotland) Act 2014 (Consequential Provisions and Modifications) Order 2015; Maximum Number of Judges (Scotland) Order 2016; Defamation and Malicious Publication (Scotland) Act 2021; Maximum Number of Judges (Scotland) Order 2022; United Nations Convention on the Rights of the Child (Incorporation) (Scotland) Act 2024

Status: Amended

Text of statute as originally enacted

Revised text of statute as amended

Text of the Court of Session Act 1988 as in force today (including any amendments) within the United Kingdom, from legislation.gov.uk.

The Court of Session Act 1988 (c. 36) is an act of the Parliament of the United Kingdom that consolidated enactments relating to the constitution, administration and procedure of the Court of Session in Scotland.

== Provisions ==
=== Repealed enactments ===
Section 52(2) of the act repealed 45 enactments, listed in part I of schedule 2 to the act. Parts II and III of that schedule show, respectively, the extent to which those enactments were re-enacted (with or without amendment) in the act, and the extent to which they were repealed without re-enactment as being no longer of practical utility or being spent or unnecessary.

Part I: Enactments Repealed
Citation	Short title	Extent of repeal
1594 c. 22	Declinature Act 1594	The whole act.
1672 c. 6	Summons Execution Act 1672	The whole act.
1681 c. 79	Declinature Act 1681	The whole act so far as relating to the Court of Session.
48 Geo. 3. c. 151	Court of Session Act 1808	The whole act.
50 Geo. 3. c. 112	Court of Session Act 1810	The whole act.
53 Geo. 3. c. 64	Court of Session Act 1813	The whole act.
55 Geo. 3. c. 42	Jury Trials (Scotland) Act 1815	Sections 1 to 19.
55 Geo. 3. c. 42	Jury Trials (Scotland) Act 1815	In section 20 the words "by the clerk of the jury court" where they occur for the second time.
55 Geo. 3. c. 42	Jury Trials (Scotland) Act 1815	Sections 21 to 41.
59 Geo. 3. c. 35	Jury Trials (Scotland) Act 1819	The whole act.
59 Geo. 3. c. 45	Court of Session Act 1819	The whole act.
1 & 2 Geo. 4. c. 38	Court of Session Act 1821	The whole act except section 32.
6 Geo. 4. c. 22	Jurors (Scotland) Act 1825	Sections 17 and 19.
6 Geo. 4. c. 120	Court of Session Act 1825	Sections 1 to 52.
6 Geo. 4. c. 120	Court of Session Act 1825	In section 53 the words from the beginning to "sixty days; and" and the words "or cited".
6 Geo. 4. c. 120	Court of Session Act 1825	Section 54.
11 Geo. 4 & 1 Will. 4. c. 69	Court of Session Act 1830	Sections 1 to 3.
11 Geo. 4 & 1 Will. 4. c. 69	Court of Session Act 1830	Section 9.
11 Geo. 4 & 1 Will. 4. c. 69	Court of Session Act 1830	Section 11.
11 Geo. 4 & 1 Will. 4. c. 69	Court of Session Act 1830	Sections 15 and 16.
11 Geo. 4 & 1 Will. 4. c. 69	Court of Session Act 1830	Section 19.
11 Geo. 4 & 1 Will. 4. c. 69	Court of Session Act 1830	Section 29, so far as relating to the Court of Session, and the proviso.
11 Geo. 4 & 1 Will. 4. c. 69	Court of Session Act 1830	Section 35.
11 Geo. 4 & 1 Will. 4. c. 69	Court of Session Act 1830	Section 37.
11 Geo. 4 & 1 Will. 4. c. 69	Court of Session Act 1830	Section 40.
2 & 3 Will. 4. c. 5	Court of Session Act 1832	The whole act.
7 Will. 4 & 1 Vict. c. 14	Jury Trials (Scotland) Act 1837	The whole act.
1 & 2 Vict. c. 86	Court of Session (No. 1) Act 1838	The whole act.
1 & 2 Vict. c. 118	Court of Session (No. 2) Act 1838	The whole act except section 27.
2 & 3 Vict. c. 36	Court of Session Act 1839	Section 1.
13 & 14 Vict. c. 36	Court of Session Act 1850	The whole act except section 16.
19 & 20 Vict. c. 56	Exchequer Court (Scotland) Act 1856	Sections 2 to 4.
19 & 20 Vict. c. 56	Exchequer Court (Scotland) Act 1856	Section 13.
19 & 20 Vict. c. 56	Exchequer Court (Scotland) Act 1856	In section 14 the words from "and such application" to "proper".
19 & 20 Vict. c. 56	Exchequer Court (Scotland) Act 1856	Sections 15 and 16.
19 & 20 Vict. c. 56	Exchequer Court (Scotland) Act 1856	Sections 19 to 23.
19 & 20 Vict. c. 56	Exchequer Court (Scotland) Act 1856	Sections 25 to 28.
19 & 20 Vict. c. 56	Exchequer Court (Scotland) Act 1856	Section 44.
19 & 20 Vict. c. 56	Exchequer Court (Scotland) Act 1856	Schedule G.
20 & 21 Vict. c. 18	Bill Chamber Procedure Act 1857	The whole act.
20 & 21 Vict. c. 56	Court of Session Act 1857	The whole act.
24 & 25 Vict. c. 86	Conjugal Rights (Scotland) Amendment Act 1861	The whole act except sections 6 and 20.
29 & 30 Vict. c. 112	Evidence (Scotland) Act 1866	The whole act.
31 & 32 Vict. c. 100	Court of Session Act 1868	Section 10.
31 & 32 Vict. c. 100	Court of Session Act 1868	Sections 12 and 13.
31 & 32 Vict. c. 100	Court of Session Act 1868	Section 14 in so far as it relates to summonses and petitions.
31 & 32 Vict. c. 100	Court of Session Act 1868	Sections 15 to 44.
31 & 32 Vict. c. 100	Court of Session Act 1868	In section 45 the words from "or at" to "such trial)".
31 & 32 Vict. c. 100	Court of Session Act 1868	Section 46.
31 & 32 Vict. c. 100	Court of Session Act 1868	In section 47 the words from "where the trial" to "town".
31 & 32 Vict. c. 100	Court of Session Act 1868	Sections 50 to 101.
31 & 32 Vict. c. 125	Parliamentary Elections Act 1868	The whole act.
40 & 41 Vict. c. 11	Jurisdiction in Rating Act 1877	In section 3, in the definition of "judge" the words "As to Scotland, any judge of the High Court of Session; and".
42 & 43 Vict. c. 75	Parliamentary Elections and Corrupt Practices Act 1879	The whole act.
46 & 47 Vict. c. 51	Corrupt and Illegal Practices Prevention Act 1883	The whole act.
52 & 53 Vict. c. 54	Clerks of Session (Scotland) Regulation Act 1889	Sections 6 and 7.
52 & 53 Vict. c. 54	Clerks of Session (Scotland) Regulation Act 1889	Section 9.
52 & 53 Vict. c. 54	Clerks of Session (Scotland) Regulation Act 1889	Section 12.
10 Edw. 7 & 1 Geo. 5. c. 31	Jury Trials Amendment (Scotland) Act 1910	The whole act.
18 & 19 Geo. 5. c. 34	Reorganisation of Offices (Scotland) Act 1928	Sections 8 and 9.
23 & 24 Geo. 5. c. 41	Administration of Justice (Scotland) Act 1933	Sections 2 to 6.
23 & 24 Geo. 5. c. 41	Administration of Justice (Scotland) Act 1933	Sections 9 to 11.
23 & 24 Geo. 5. c. 41	Administration of Justice (Scotland) Act 1933	Sections 13 to 18.
23 & 24 Geo. 5. c. 41	Administration of Justice (Scotland) Act 1933	In section 24, subsection (5).
23 & 24 Geo. 5. c. 41	Administration of Justice (Scotland) Act 1933	Section 30.
23 & 24 Geo. 5. c. 41	Administration of Justice (Scotland) Act 1933	In section 40, the definition of "consistorial cause".
12, 13 & 14 Geo. 6. c. 10	Administration of Justice (Scotland) Act 1948	The whole act.
12 & 13 Geo. 6. c. 27	Juries Act 1949	Schedule 1 so far as relating to the Court of Session Act 1868.
1968 c. 5	Administration of Justice Act 1968	The whole act so far as relating to Scotland.
1972 c. 59	Administration of Justice (Scotland) Act 1972	Section 2.
1977 c. 38	Administration of Justice Act 1977	Section 29(1).
1980 c. 55	Law Reform (Miscellaneous Provisions) (Scotland) Act 1980	Section 1(6)(b).
1983 c. 12	Divorce Jurisdiction, Court Fees and Legal Aid (Scotland) Act 1983	In Schedule 1, paragraphs 5 and 8.
1985 c. 6	Companies Act 1985	In section 425(5) the words from "in pursuance" to "1933".
1985 c. 73	Law Reform (Miscellaneous Provisions) (Scotland) Act 1985	In Schedule 2, paragraph 8.
1986 c. 9	Law Reform (Parent and Child) (Scotland) Act 1986	In Schedule 1, paragraph 2.
1986 c. 45	Insolvency Act 1986	In section 120(2) the words from "in pursuance" to the end.
1986 c. 45	Insolvency Act 1986	In section 162(2) the words from "in pursuance" to "1933".
1986 c. 55	Family Law Act 1986	In Schedule 1, paragraph 1.

Part II: Repealed Enactments which are Re-enacted
Citation	Short title	Extent re-enacted
48 Geo. 3. c. 151	Court of Session Act 1808	Section 15 except the words "to which such Lords Ordinary belong".
48 Geo. 3. c. 151	Court of Session Act 1808	Section 17 except the words "or any four of the judges thereof".
48 Geo. 3. c. 151	Court of Session Act 1808	Sections 18 to 20.
50 Geo. 3. c. 112	Court of Session Act 1810	In section 32 the words from "three judges" to "inner house".
53 Geo. 3. c. 64	Court of Session Act 1813	In section 17 the words from "the endorsation" to the end.
55 Geo. 3. c. 42	Jury Trials (Scotland) Act 1815	Section 1.
55 Geo. 3. c. 42	Jury Trials (Scotland) Act 1815	Section 5.
55 Geo. 3. c. 42	Jury Trials (Scotland) Act 1815	In section 6, the proviso.
55 Geo. 3. c. 42	Jury Trials (Scotland) Act 1815	In section 7 the words from "notwithstanding" to "when necessary".
55 Geo. 3. c. 42	Jury Trials (Scotland) Act 1815	Section 8 except the words "or judges" and "or by the judge admiral respectively".
55 Geo. 3. c. 42	Jury Trials (Scotland) Act 1815	In section 21 the words from "in challenging" to the end.
55 Geo. 3. c. 42	Jury Trials (Scotland) Act 1815	In section 29 the words from the beginning to "be allowed".
55 Geo. 3. c. 42	Jury Trials (Scotland) Act 1815	Section 33 except the words from "to be afterwards" to the end.
59 Geo. 3. c. 45	Court of Session Act 1819	Section 1 in so far as it enables the senior Lord Ordinary to fill a vacancy arising in the Inner House.
1 & 2 Geo. 4. c. 38	Court of Session Act 1821	Section 1 except the words "advocation and" and "either for the lord ordinary on the bills or".
6 Geo. 4. c. 120	Court of Session Act 1825	Section 1.
6 Geo. 4. c. 120	Court of Session Act 1825	Section 5 so far as relating to appeal to the House of Lords.
6 Geo. 4. c. 120	Court of Session Act 1825	In section 17 the words from "every interlocutor" to the end.
6 Geo. 4. c. 120	Court of Session Act 1825	In section 21 the words from "the judgment" to the end.
6 Geo. 4. c. 120	Court of Session Act 1825	Section 23.
6 Geo. 4. c. 120	Court of Session Act 1825	Section 28 except the words from "all actions on account of any injury to moveables" to "seduction", from "all actions on the responsibility" to "nuisance" and from "all actions on policies" to the end and except so far as relating to the jury court and Court of Admiralty.
6 Geo. 4. c. 120	Court of Session Act 1825	In section 40 the words from the beginning to "in the interlocutor" and from "and further" to "of the case" but only in relation to proofs in sheriff courts.
6 Geo. 4. c. 120	Court of Session Act 1825	In section 46 the words from "and in the event" to the end.
1 & 2 Vict. c. 86	Court of Session (No. 1) Act 1838	In section 4 the words from "in all cases" to "interim possession".
1 & 2 Vict. c. 86	Court of Session (No. 1) Act 1838	In section 5 the words from the beginning to "Session".
13 & 14 Vict. c. 36	Court of Session Act 1850	Section 25.
13 & 14 Vict. c. 36	Court of Session Act 1850	Section 28 except the words "without the necessity of such special allowance".
13 & 14 Vict. c. 36	Court of Session Act 1850	Section 35.
13 & 14 Vict. c. 36	Court of Session Act 1850	Section 42.
19 & 20 Vict. c. 56	Exchequer Court (Scotland) Act 1856	Sections 2 and 3.
19 & 20 Vict. c. 56	Exchequer Court (Scotland) Act 1856	Section 20.
19 & 20 Vict. c. 56	Exchequer Court (Scotland) Act 1856	Sections 22 and 23.
19 & 20 Vict. c. 56	Exchequer Court (Scotland) Act 1856	Section 25.
20 & 21 Vict. c. 56	Court of Session Act 1857	Section 5 so far as relating to petitions.
20 & 21 Vict. c. 56	Court of Session Act 1857	Section 6 so far as relating to petitions.
24 & 25 Vict. c. 86	Conjugal Rights (Scotland) Amendment Act 1861	Sections 8 and 9.
24 & 25 Vict. c. 86	Conjugal Rights (Scotland) Amendment Act 1861	In section 13, the proviso.
29 & 30 Vict. c. 112	Evidence (Scotland) Act 1866	Section 1 in so far as it authorises the taking of proof before the Lord Ordinary.
29 & 30 Vict. c. 112	Evidence (Scotland) Act 1866	Section 2.
29 & 30 Vict. c. 112	Evidence (Scotland) Act 1866	Section 3 except the words from "and where" to the end.
29 & 30 Vict. c. 112	Evidence (Scotland) Act 1866	Section 4.
29 & 30 Vict. c. 112	Evidence (Scotland) Act 1866	Section 6.
31 & 32 Vict. c. 100	Court of Session Act 1868	Section 36.
31 & 32 Vict. c. 100	Court of Session Act 1868	Section 44 except the words from "and if" to the end.
31 & 32 Vict. c. 100	Court of Session Act 1868	Section 59.
31 & 32 Vict. c. 100	Court of Session Act 1868	Section 60 except the words from "the printed" to "or to direct that".
31 & 32 Vict. c. 100	Court of Session Act 1868	In section 61 the words from the beginning to "verdict".
31 & 32 Vict. c. 100	Court of Session Act 1868	Sections 62 and 63.
31 & 32 Vict. c. 100	Court of Session Act 1868	Section 72 so far as relating to appeals from the sheriff, except the words "although such law is not pleaded on the record".
31 & 32 Vict. c. 100	Court of Session Act 1868	Section 74 so far as relating to transmission of sheriff court causes.
31 & 32 Vict. c. 100	Court of Session Act 1868	Section 89.
31 & 32 Vict. c. 100	Court of Session Act 1868	In section 91 the words from the beginning to "seem proper".
31 & 32 Vict. c. 100	Court of Session Act 1868	In section 92, the last sentence.
31 & 32 Vict. c. 100	Court of Session Act 1868	Section 100(2).
31 & 32 Vict. c. 125	Parliamentary Elections Act 1868	Section 58.
40 & 41 Vict. c. 11	Jurisdiction in Rating Act 1877	In section 3, in the definition of "judge" the words "As to Scotland, any judge of the High Court of Session, and".
42 & 43 Vict. c. 75	Parliamentary Elections and Corrupt Practices Act 1879	Section 2.
46 & 47 Vict. c. 51	Corrupt and Illegal Practices Prevention Act 1883	Section 42.
10 Edw. 7 & 1 Geo. 5. c. 31	Jury Trials Amendment (Scotland) Act 1910	Section 2.
23 & 24 Geo. 5. c. 41	Administration of Justice (Scotland) Act 1933	Section 2(1).
23 & 24 Geo. 5. c. 41	Administration of Justice (Scotland) Act 1933	Section 3(2).
23 & 24 Geo. 5. c. 41	Administration of Justice (Scotland) Act 1933	Section 4 so far as it relates to the regulation of the powers of the vacation judge by act of sederunt.
23 & 24 Geo. 5. c. 41	Administration of Justice (Scotland) Act 1933	In section 6, subsections (4) and (7).
23 & 24 Geo. 5. c. 41	Administration of Justice (Scotland) Act 1933	In section 10, subsections (1) and (6) to (8).
23 & 24 Geo. 5. c. 41	Administration of Justice (Scotland) Act 1933	In section 11, subsections (1) and (2).
23 & 24 Geo. 5. c. 41	Administration of Justice (Scotland) Act 1933	Section 14 so far as providing competence for reclaiming.
23 & 24 Geo. 5. c. 41	Administration of Justice (Scotland) Act 1933	Section 15 so far as relating to power to prescribe form of extract of decree.
23 & 24 Geo. 5. c. 41	Administration of Justice (Scotland) Act 1933	Sections 16 and 17.
23 & 24 Geo. 5. c. 41	Administration of Justice (Scotland) Act 1933	Section 18 except proviso (i) to subsection (3).
23 & 24 Geo. 5. c. 41	Administration of Justice (Scotland) Act 1933	Section 24(5).
12, 13 & 14 Geo. 6. c. 10	Administration of Justice (Scotland) Act 1948	Section 1 except the words from "when" to "thirteen".
12, 13 & 14 Geo. 6. c. 10	Administration of Justice (Scotland) Act 1948	Sections 2 and 3.
12 & 13 Geo. 6. c. 27	Juries Act 1949	Schedule 1 so far as relating to the Court of Session Act 1868.
1968 c. 5	Administration of Justice Act 1968	Section 1 so far as relating to Scotland.
1972 c. 59	Administration of Justice (Scotland) Act 1972	Section 2.
1977 c. 38	Administration of Justice Act 1977	Section 29(1).
1983 c. 12	Divorce Jurisdiction, Court Fees and Legal Aid (Scotland) Act 1983	In Schedule 1, paragraph 8.
1985 c. 73	Law Reform (Miscellaneous Provisions) (Scotland) Act 1985	In Schedule 2, paragraph 8.
1986 c. 9	Law Reform (Parent and Child) (Scotland) Act 1986	In Schedule 1, paragraph 2.

Part III: Repealed Enactments which are not Re-enacted
Citation	Short title	Extent not re-enacted
1594 c. 22	Declinature Act 1594	The whole act.
1672 c. 6	Summons Execution Act 1672	The whole act.
1681 c. 79	Declinature Act 1681	The whole act so far as relating to the Court of Session.
48 Geo. 3. c. 151	Court of Session Act 1808	Section 1.
48 Geo. 3. c. 151	Court of Session Act 1808	Section 4.
48 Geo. 3. c. 151	Court of Session Act 1808	Section 6.
48 Geo. 3. c. 151	Court of Session Act 1808	Section 10.
48 Geo. 3. c. 151	Court of Session Act 1808	Section 13.
48 Geo. 3. c. 151	Court of Session Act 1808	In section 15 the words "to which such Lords Ordinary belong".
48 Geo. 3. c. 151	Court of Session Act 1808	In section 17 the words "or any four of the judges thereof".
48 Geo. 3. c. 151	Court of Session Act 1808	Section 21.
50 Geo. 3. c. 112	Court of Session Act 1810	Section 11.
50 Geo. 3. c. 112	Court of Session Act 1810	Section 13.
50 Geo. 3. c. 112	Court of Session Act 1810	Sections 18 to 25.
50 Geo. 3. c. 112	Court of Session Act 1810	Sections 28 to 30.
50 Geo. 3. c. 112	Court of Session Act 1810	Section 32 except the words from "three judges" to "inner house".
50 Geo. 3. c. 112	Court of Session Act 1810	Sections 33 to 38.
50 Geo. 3. c. 112	Court of Session Act 1810	Section 48.
50 Geo. 3. c. 112	Court of Session Act 1810	Sections 51 and 52.
50 Geo. 3. c. 112	Court of Session Act 1810	The Schedules.
53 Geo. 3. c. 64	Court of Session Act 1813	Section 1.
53 Geo. 3. c. 64	Court of Session Act 1813	Section 7.
53 Geo. 3. c. 64	Court of Session Act 1813	Section 14.
53 Geo. 3. c. 64	Court of Session Act 1813	Section 17 except the words from "the endorsation" to the end.
55 Geo. 3. c. 42	Jury Trials (Scotland) Act 1815	Section 6 except the proviso.
55 Geo. 3. c. 42	Jury Trials (Scotland) Act 1815	Section 7 except the words from "notwithstanding" to "when necessary".
55 Geo. 3. c. 42	Jury Trials (Scotland) Act 1815	In section 8 the words "or judges" and "or by the judge admiral respectively".
55 Geo. 3. c. 42	Jury Trials (Scotland) Act 1815	Section 9.
55 Geo. 3. c. 42	Jury Trials (Scotland) Act 1815	Section 12.
55 Geo. 3. c. 42	Jury Trials (Scotland) Act 1815	Sections 15 to 17.
55 Geo. 3. c. 42	Jury Trials (Scotland) Act 1815	Section 19.
55 Geo. 3. c. 42	Jury Trials (Scotland) Act 1815	In section 20 the words "by the clerk of the jury court" where they occur for the second time.
55 Geo. 3. c. 42	Jury Trials (Scotland) Act 1815	In section 21 the words from the beginning to "Provided always that".
55 Geo. 3. c. 42	Jury Trials (Scotland) Act 1815	Section 22.
55 Geo. 3. c. 42	Jury Trials (Scotland) Act 1815	Section 23.
55 Geo. 3. c. 42	Jury Trials (Scotland) Act 1815	Section 28.
55 Geo. 3. c. 42	Jury Trials (Scotland) Act 1815	In section 29 the words after "be allowed".
55 Geo. 3. c. 42	Jury Trials (Scotland) Act 1815	In section 33 the words from "to be afterwards" to the end.
55 Geo. 3. c. 42	Jury Trials (Scotland) Act 1815	Section 39.
55 Geo. 3. c. 42	Jury Trials (Scotland) Act 1815	Section 41.
59 Geo. 3. c. 35	Jury Trials (Scotland) Act 1819	Sections 7 to 9.
59 Geo. 3. c. 35	Jury Trials (Scotland) Act 1819	Sections 13 and 14.
59 Geo. 3. c. 35	Jury Trials (Scotland) Act 1819	Section 17.
59 Geo. 3. c. 35	Jury Trials (Scotland) Act 1819	Section 19.
59 Geo. 3. c. 35	Jury Trials (Scotland) Act 1819	Sections 26 and 27.
59 Geo. 3. c. 35	Jury Trials (Scotland) Act 1819	Section 35.
59 Geo. 3. c. 45	Court of Session Act 1819	Section 1 except in so far as it enables the senior Lord Ordinary to fill a vacancy arising in the Inner House.
59 Geo. 3. c. 45	Court of Session Act 1819	Section 3.
59 Geo. 3. c. 45	Court of Session Act 1819	Section 6.
1 & 2 Geo. 4. c. 38	Court of Session Act 1821	In section 1 the words "advocation and" and "either for the Lord Ordinary on the bills or".
1 & 2 Geo. 4. c. 38	Court of Session Act 1821	Section 3.
1 & 2 Geo. 4. c. 38	Court of Session Act 1821	Section 9.
1 & 2 Geo. 4. c. 38	Court of Session Act 1821	Sections 11 to 14.
1 & 2 Geo. 4. c. 38	Court of Session Act 1821	Section 18.
1 & 2 Geo. 4. c. 38	Court of Session Act 1821	Section 24.
1 & 2 Geo. 4. c. 38	Court of Session Act 1821	Sections 26 and 27.
1 & 2 Geo. 4. c. 38	Court of Session Act 1821	Sections 29 to 31.
6 Geo. 4. c. 22	Jurors (Scotland) Act 1825	Sections 17 and 19.
6 Geo. 4. c. 120	Court of Session Act 1825	Section 5 except so far as relating to appeal to the House of Lords.
6 Geo. 4. c. 120	Court of Session Act 1825	Sections 11 and 12.
6 Geo. 4. c. 120	Court of Session Act 1825	In section 17 the words from the beginning to "in part; and".
6 Geo. 4. c. 120	Court of Session Act 1825	Section 20.
6 Geo. 4. c. 120	Court of Session Act 1825	In section 21 the words from the beginning to "expenses; and".
6 Geo. 4. c. 120	Court of Session Act 1825	Section 22.
6 Geo. 4. c. 120	Court of Session Act 1825	Sections 24 to 26.
6 Geo. 4. c. 120	Court of Session Act 1825	In section 28 the words from "all actions on account of any injury to moveables" to "seduction", from "all actions on the responsibility" to "nuisance" and from "all actions on policies" to the end and that section so far as relating to the jury court and the Court of Admiralty.
6 Geo. 4. c. 120	Court of Session Act 1825	Section 33.
6 Geo. 4. c. 120	Court of Session Act 1825	Section 35.
6 Geo. 4. c. 120	Court of Session Act 1825	Section 40 so far as relating to proofs in inferior courts other than sheriff courts and in that section the words from "Provided however" to "repealed" and from "but it is" to the end.
6 Geo. 4. c. 120	Court of Session Act 1825	Section 44.
6 Geo. 4. c. 120	Court of Session Act 1825	Section 45.
6 Geo. 4. c. 120	Court of Session Act 1825	In section 46 the words from the beginning to "other division".
6 Geo. 4. c. 120	Court of Session Act 1825	Sections 47 and 48.
6 Geo. 4. c. 120	Court of Session Act 1825	Sections 51 and 52.
6 Geo. 4. c. 120	Court of Session Act 1825	In section 53 the words from the beginning to "sixty days; and" and the words "or cited".
6 Geo. 4. c. 120	Court of Session Act 1825	Section 54.
11 Geo. 4 & 1 Will. 4. c. 69	Court of Session Act 1830	Sections 1 to 3.
11 Geo. 4 & 1 Will. 4. c. 69	Court of Session Act 1830	Section 9.
11 Geo. 4 & 1 Will. 4. c. 69	Court of Session Act 1830	Section 11.
11 Geo. 4 & 1 Will. 4. c. 69	Court of Session Act 1830	Sections 15 and 16.
11 Geo. 4 & 1 Will. 4. c. 69	Court of Session Act 1830	Section 19.
11 Geo. 4 & 1 Will. 4. c. 69	Court of Session Act 1830	Section 29, so far as relating to the Court of Session, and the proviso.
11 Geo. 4 & 1 Will. 4. c. 69	Court of Session Act 1830	Section 35.
11 Geo. 4 & 1 Will. 4. c. 69	Court of Session Act 1830	Section 37.
11 Geo. 4 & 1 Will. 4. c. 69	Court of Session Act 1830	Section 40.
2 & 3 Will. 4. c. 5	Court of Session Act 1832	The whole act.
7 Will. 4 & 1 Vict. c. 14	Jury Trials (Scotland) Act 1837	The whole act.
1 & 2 Vict. c. 86	Court of Session (No. 1) Act 1838	Section 4 except the words from "in all cases" to "interim possession".
1 & 2 Vict. c. 86	Court of Session (No. 1) Act 1838	In section 5 the words from "by lodging" to the end.
1 & 2 Vict. c. 86	Court of Session (No. 1) Act 1838	Section 6.
1 & 2 Vict. c. 118	Court of Session (No. 2) Act 1838	Section 1.
1 & 2 Vict. c. 118	Court of Session (No. 2) Act 1838	Section 4.
1 & 2 Vict. c. 118	Court of Session (No. 2) Act 1838	Section 14.
1 & 2 Vict. c. 118	Court of Session (No. 2) Act 1838	Section 17.
1 & 2 Vict. c. 118	Court of Session (No. 2) Act 1838	Section 21.
1 & 2 Vict. c. 118	Court of Session (No. 2) Act 1838	Section 24.
1 & 2 Vict. c. 118	Court of Session (No. 2) Act 1838	Section 26.
1 & 2 Vict. c. 118	Court of Session (No. 2) Act 1838	Sections 28 and 29.
1 & 2 Vict. c. 118	Court of Session (No. 2) Act 1838	The Schedule.
2 & 3 Vict. c. 36	Court of Session Act 1839	Section 1.
13 & 14 Vict. c. 36	Court of Session Act 1850	Section 5.
13 & 14 Vict. c. 36	Court of Session Act 1850	Sections 7 and 8.
13 & 14 Vict. c. 36	Court of Session Act 1850	Sections 17 to 20.
13 & 14 Vict. c. 36	Court of Session Act 1850	Sections 22 and 23.
13 & 14 Vict. c. 36	Court of Session Act 1850	Sections 26 and 27.
13 & 14 Vict. c. 36	Court of Session Act 1850	In section 28 the words "without the necessity of such special allowance".
13 & 14 Vict. c. 36	Court of Session Act 1850	Section 29.
13 & 14 Vict. c. 36	Court of Session Act 1850	Section 32.
13 & 14 Vict. c. 36	Court of Session Act 1850	Section 36.
13 & 14 Vict. c. 36	Court of Session Act 1850	Sections 39 to 41.
13 & 14 Vict. c. 36	Court of Session Act 1850	Sections 44 to 53.
13 & 14 Vict. c. 36	Court of Session Act 1850	Schedule (B).
19 & 20 Vict. c. 56	Exchequer Court (Scotland) Act 1856	Section 4.
19 & 20 Vict. c. 56	Exchequer Court (Scotland) Act 1856	Section 13.
19 & 20 Vict. c. 56	Exchequer Court (Scotland) Act 1856	In section 14 the words from "and such application" to "proper".
19 & 20 Vict. c. 56	Exchequer Court (Scotland) Act 1856	Sections 15 and 16.
19 & 20 Vict. c. 56	Exchequer Court (Scotland) Act 1856	Section 19.
19 & 20 Vict. c. 56	Exchequer Court (Scotland) Act 1856	Sections 26 to 28.
19 & 20 Vict. c. 56	Exchequer Court (Scotland) Act 1856	Section 44.
19 & 20 Vict. c. 56	Exchequer Court (Scotland) Act 1856	Schedule G.
20 & 21 Vict. c. 18	Bill Chamber Procedure Act 1857	The whole act.
20 & 21 Vict. c. 56	Court of Session Act 1857	Section 5 so far as relating to applications and reports.
20 & 21 Vict. c. 56	Court of Session Act 1857	Section 6 so far as relating to applications and reports.
20 & 21 Vict. c. 56	Court of Session Act 1857	Section 8.
24 & 25 Vict. c. 86	Conjugal Rights (Scotland) Amendment Act 1861	Section 10.
24 & 25 Vict. c. 86	Conjugal Rights (Scotland) Amendment Act 1861	Section 13 except the proviso.
24 & 25 Vict. c. 86	Conjugal Rights (Scotland) Amendment Act 1861	Section 19.
29 & 30 Vict. c. 112	Evidence (Scotland) Act 1866	Section 1 except in so far as it authorises the taking of proof before the Lord Ordinary.
29 & 30 Vict. c. 112	Evidence (Scotland) Act 1866	In section 3 the words from "and where" to the end.
31 & 32 Vict. c. 100	Court of Session Act 1868	Section 10.
31 & 32 Vict. c. 100	Court of Session Act 1868	Sections 12 and 13.
31 & 32 Vict. c. 100	Court of Session Act 1868	Section 14 in so far as it relates to summonses and petitions.
31 & 32 Vict. c. 100	Court of Session Act 1868	Sections 15 to 17.
31 & 32 Vict. c. 100	Court of Session Act 1868	Sections 20 to 22.
31 & 32 Vict. c. 100	Court of Session Act 1868	Sections 25 and 26.
31 & 32 Vict. c. 100	Court of Session Act 1868	Sections 28 to 30.
31 & 32 Vict. c. 100	Court of Session Act 1868	Section 32.
31 & 32 Vict. c. 100	Court of Session Act 1868	Sections 34 and 35.
31 & 32 Vict. c. 100	Court of Session Act 1868	Sections 37 and 38.
31 & 32 Vict. c. 100	Court of Session Act 1868	Sections 40 and 41.
31 & 32 Vict. c. 100	Court of Session Act 1868	Section 43.
31 & 32 Vict. c. 100	Court of Session Act 1868	In section 44 the words from "and if" to the end.
31 & 32 Vict. c. 100	Court of Session Act 1868	In section 45 the words from "or at" to "such trial)".
31 & 32 Vict. c. 100	Court of Session Act 1868	Section 46.
31 & 32 Vict. c. 100	Court of Session Act 1868	In section 47 the words from "where the trial" to "town".
31 & 32 Vict. c. 100	Court of Session Act 1868	Section 50.
31 & 32 Vict. c. 100	Court of Session Act 1868	Sections 52 and 53.
31 & 32 Vict. c. 100	Court of Session Act 1868	Sections 56 to 58.
31 & 32 Vict. c. 100	Court of Session Act 1868	In section 60 the words from "the printed" to "or to direct that".
31 & 32 Vict. c. 100	Court of Session Act 1868	In section 61 the words from "but this" to the end.
31 & 32 Vict. c. 100	Court of Session Act 1868	Sections 65 to 71.
31 & 32 Vict. c. 100	Court of Session Act 1868	In section 72 the words "although such law is not pleaded on the record" and that section except so far as relating to appeals from the sheriff.
31 & 32 Vict. c. 100	Court of Session Act 1868	Section 73.
31 & 32 Vict. c. 100	Court of Session Act 1868	Section 74 except so far as relating to transmission of sheriff court causes.
31 & 32 Vict. c. 100	Court of Session Act 1868	Sections 76 to 88.
31 & 32 Vict. c. 100	Court of Session Act 1868	Section 90.
31 & 32 Vict. c. 100	Court of Session Act 1868	In section 91 the words from "and such petitions" to the end.
31 & 32 Vict. c. 100	Court of Session Act 1868	Section 92 except the last sentence.
31 & 32 Vict. c. 100	Court of Session Act 1868	Section 93.
31 & 32 Vict. c. 100	Court of Session Act 1868	Sections 95 to 99.
31 & 32 Vict. c. 100	Court of Session Act 1868	Section 100(1).
31 & 32 Vict. c. 100	Court of Session Act 1868	Section 101.
31 & 32 Vict. c. 125	Parliamentary Elections Act 1868	Section 1.
42 & 43 Vict. c. 75	Parliamentary Elections and Corrupt Practices Act 1879	Section 1.
46 & 47 Vict. c. 51	Corrupt and Illegal Practices Prevention Act 1883	Section 65.
52 & 53 Vict. c. 54	Clerks of Session (Scotland) Regulation Act 1889	Sections 6 and 7.
52 & 53 Vict. c. 54	Clerks of Session (Scotland) Regulation Act 1889	Section 9.
52 & 53 Vict. c. 54	Clerks of Session (Scotland) Regulation Act 1889	Section 12.
10 Edw. 7 & 1 Geo. 5. c. 31	Jury Trials Amendment (Scotland) Act 1910	Sections 3 and 4.
18 & 19 Geo. 5. c. 34	Reorganisation of Offices (Scotland) Act 1928	Sections 8 and 9.
23 & 24 Geo. 5. c. 41	Administration of Justice (Scotland) Act 1933	Section 2(2).
23 & 24 Geo. 5. c. 41	Administration of Justice (Scotland) Act 1933	Section 3(1).
23 & 24 Geo. 5. c. 41	Administration of Justice (Scotland) Act 1933	Section 4 except so far as it relates to the regulation of the powers of the vacation judge by act of sederunt.
23 & 24 Geo. 5. c. 41	Administration of Justice (Scotland) Act 1933	Section 5.
23 & 24 Geo. 5. c. 41	Administration of Justice (Scotland) Act 1933	In section 6, subsections (1) to (3) and (5) and (6).
23 & 24 Geo. 5. c. 41	Administration of Justice (Scotland) Act 1933	Section 9.
23 & 24 Geo. 5. c. 41	Administration of Justice (Scotland) Act 1933	In section 10, subsections (2) to (5).
23 & 24 Geo. 5. c. 41	Administration of Justice (Scotland) Act 1933	Section 11(3).
23 & 24 Geo. 5. c. 41	Administration of Justice (Scotland) Act 1933	Section 13.
23 & 24 Geo. 5. c. 41	Administration of Justice (Scotland) Act 1933	Section 14 so far as relating to procedure.
23 & 24 Geo. 5. c. 41	Administration of Justice (Scotland) Act 1933	Section 15 except so far as relating to power to prescribe form of extract of decree.
23 & 24 Geo. 5. c. 41	Administration of Justice (Scotland) Act 1933	In section 18(3), proviso (i).
23 & 24 Geo. 5. c. 41	Administration of Justice (Scotland) Act 1933	Section 30.
23 & 24 Geo. 5. c. 41	Administration of Justice (Scotland) Act 1933	In section 40, the definition of "consistorial cause".
12, 13 & 14 Geo. 6. c. 10	Administration of Justice (Scotland) Act 1948	In section 1 the words from "when" to "thirteen".
12, 13 & 14 Geo. 6. c. 10	Administration of Justice (Scotland) Act 1948	Section 5.
1968 c. 5	Administration of Justice Act 1968	Section 2.
1980 c. 55	Law Reform (Miscellaneous Provisions) (Scotland) Act 1980	Section 1(6)(b).
1983 c. 12	Divorce Jurisdiction, Court Fees and Legal Aid (Scotland) Act 1983	In Schedule 1, paragraph 5.
1985 c. 6	Companies Act 1985	In section 425(5) the words from "in pursuance" to "1933".
1986 c. 45	Insolvency Act 1986	In section 120(2) the words from "in pursuance" to the end.
1986 c. 45	Insolvency Act 1986	In section 162(2) the words from "in pursuance" to "1933".
1986 c. 55	Family Law Act 1986	In Schedule 1, paragraph 1.
