= Outer House =

One of the two parts of the Scottish Court of Session

The Outer House (abbreviated as CSOH in neutral citations) is one of the two parts of the Scottish Court of Session, which is the supreme civil court in Scotland. It is a court of first instance, although some statutory appeals are remitted to it by the other more senior part, the Inner House. Those appeals are made from the Sheriff court, the court of first instance for low value civil causes in the court system of Scotland.

A Lord Ordinary is a judge in the Outer House; judges are referred to as "Lord [name]" or "Lady [name]". They are drawn from the Senators of the College of Justice and they sit singly, sometimes with a jury in personal injury and defamation actions. Jurisdiction is extensive and extends to all kinds of civil claims unless expressly excluded by statute. Some classes of cases, such as intellectual property disputes and exchequer causes, are heard by designated judges. Prior to 1856, the jurisdiction for exchequer causes was that of the Court of Exchequer, which has been transferred to the Court of Session with one of the Lords Ordinary required to be Lord Ordinary in Exchequer Causes, this was restated by the Court of Session Act 1988.

Final (and some important procedural) judgments of the Outer House may be appealed to the Inner House. Other judgments may be so appealed with the leave of the court.
