= List of acts of the Parliament of Scotland from 1522 =

This is a list of acts of the Parliament of Scotland for the year 1522.

It lists acts of Parliament of the old Parliament of Scotland, that was merged with the old Parliament of England to form the Parliament of Great Britain, by the Union with England Act 1707 (c. 7).

For other years, see list of acts of the Parliament of Scotland. For the period after 1707, see list of acts of the Parliament of Great Britain.

== 1522 ==
The 2nd parliament of James V, held in Edinburgh from 24 July 1522.

Short title, or popular name	Citation	Royal assent
Long title
Estates of those Slain in Battle Act 1522 (repealed)	1522 c. 1 (Note: This is the citation in the Record Edition.); 1522 c. 3 (Note: This is the citation in the Duodecimal Edition.)	24 July 1522
Anent the waird releifis and mariageis of ony man slane in oist or army aganis our auld inimeis of Ingland. Regarding the ward, relief and marriage of any man killed in host or army against our old enemies of England.. (Repealed by Statute Law Revision (Scotland) Act 1906 (6 Edw. 7. c. 38))
Leases of Tenants Slain in Battle Act 1522 (repealed)	1522 c. 2; 1522 c. 4	24 July 1522
Anent the takkis or steidingis of tennentis slane be Inglismen in our soverane lordis armie. Regarding the tacks and steadings of tenants slain by Englishmen in our sovereign lord's army. (Repealed by Statute Law Revision (Scotland) Act 1906 (6 Edw. 7. c. 38))

=== Sources ===
- Alexander, William (1841). "Acta Parliamentorum Regis Jacobi Quinti". An Abridgement of the Acts of the Parliaments of Scotland. Edinburgh: Adam and Charles Black. p. A14 – via Google Books.
- Alexander, William (1841). "Acta Parliamentorum Regis Jacobi Quinti". An Abridgement of the Acts of the Parliaments of Scotland. Edinburgh: Adam and Charles Black. p. A14 – via Google Books.
- Chronological Table of the Statutes. London: Her Majesty's Stationery Office. 1972. p. 1327 – via Google Books.
- "Index of Statutes: James V (1513-1542)". Records of the Parliaments of Scotland to 1707. University of St Andrews.

== See also ==
- List of legislation in the United Kingdom
- Records of the Parliaments of Scotland
