= List of acts of the Parliament of Scotland from 1525 =

This is a list of acts of the Parliament of Scotland for the year 1525.

It lists acts of Parliament of the old Parliament of Scotland, that was merged with the old Parliament of England to form the Parliament of Great Britain, by the Union with England Act 1707 (c. 7).

For other years, see list of acts of the Parliament of Scotland. For the period after 1707, see list of acts of the Parliament of Great Britain.

== 1525 ==
A parliament of James V, held in Edinburgh from 6 July 1525.

Short title, or popular name	Citation	Royal assent
Long title
Church Act 1525 (repealed)	1525 c. 1 (Note: This is the citation in the Record Edition.) — (Note: This act is not listed in the Duodecimal Edition.)	11 July 1525
Of the fredom of halikirk. Of the freedom of the holy church. (Repealed by Statute Law Revision (Scotland) Act 1906 (6 Edw. 7. c. 38))
Barratry Act 1525 (repealed)	1525 c. 2 —	11 July 1525
Of the Actis maid aganis thaim purchessand benefice at the court of Rome. OPf the Acts made against those purchasing benefices at the Court of Rome. (Repealed by Statute Law Revision (Scotland) Act 1906 (6 Edw. 7. c. 38))
Subscription of Writs Act 1525 (repealed)	1525 c. 3 —	17 July 1525
That na faith be gevin to ony writing under ane sele without subscriptioun. That no faith be given to any writing under any seal without subscription. (Repealed by Statute Law Revision (Scotland) Act 1906 (6 Edw. 7. c. 38))
Heresy Act 1525 (repealed)	1525 c. 4 —	17 July 1525
Anent the dampnable opunyeouns of heresy. Regarding the damnable opinions of heresy. (Repealed by Statute Law Revision (Scotland) Act 1906 (6 Edw. 7. c. 38))
Quorum of Lords Act 1525 (repealed)	1525 c. 5 —	31 July 1525
That the lordis havand the kingis auctoritie sall nocht use the samin bot be all the lordis togidder or the maist part of thaim. That the lords having the king's authority shall not use the same but by all the lords together or the most part of them. (Repealed by Statute Law Revision (Scotland) Act 1906 (6 Edw. 7. c. 38))
Sentence of Cursing Act 1525 (repealed)	1525 c. 6 —	3 August 1525
Anent the kingis letteris to be gevin aganis thame that lyis under the sentence of cursing for the space of xl dais. Regarding the king's letters to be given against those that lie under the sentence of cursing for the space of 40 days. (Repealed by Statute Law Revision (Scotland) Act 1906 (6 Edw. 7. c. 38))
Treaty with England Act 1525 (repealed)	1525 c. 7 —	3 August 1525
Of ane commissioun for treting of pece with Ingland. Of a commission for treating for peace with England. (Repealed by Statute Law Revision (Scotland) Act 1906 (6 Edw. 7. c. 38))
Criminal Procedure Act 1525 (repealed)	1525 c. 8 —	3 August 1525
Anent the processis of Justice airis and Justice courtis. Regarding the process of Justice ayres and Justice courts. (Repealed by Statute Law Revision (Scotland) Act 1906 (6 Edw. 7. c. 38))
Public Peace Act 1525 (repealed)	1525 c. 9 —	3 August 1525
Anent thame that lay wachis and besett gaitis for the slauchtir and invasioun of the persouns that thai has inemytie aganis. Regarding those that lay watch and beset gates for the slaughter and invasion of the persons that they have enmity against. (Repealed by Statute Law Revision (Scotland) Act 1906 (6 Edw. 7. c. 38))
Fire Raising and Rape Act 1525 (repealed)	1525 c. 10 —	3 August 1525
Of the committaris of the crymes of fire rasing and revesing of wemen. Of the committers of the crimes of fire-raising and raping of women. (Repealed by Statute Law Revision (Scotland) Act 1906 (6 Edw. 7. c. 38))
Privy Council Act 1525 (repealed)	1525 c. 11 —	3 August 1525
Ratificatioun of giftis actis &c. done be the lordis of Secret Counsale in absence of the Quenis grace. Ratification of the gifts, acts, etc. done by the lords of the Secret Council in the absence of the Queen's person. (Repealed by Statute Law Revision (Scotland) Act 1906 (6 Edw. 7. c. 38))

=== Sources ===
- Alexander, William (1841). "Acta Parliamentorum Regis Jacobi Quinti". An Abridgement of the Acts of the Parliaments of Scotland. Edinburgh: Adam and Charles Black. p. A15 – via Google Books.
- Alexander, William (1841). "Acta Parliamentorum Regis Jacobi Quinti". An Abridgement of the Acts of the Parliaments of Scotland. Edinburgh: Adam and Charles Black. p. A15 – via Google Books.
- Chronological Table of the Statutes. London: Her Majesty's Stationery Office. 1972. p. 1328 – via Google Books.
- "Index of Statutes: James V (1513-1542)". Records of the Parliaments of Scotland to 1707. University of St Andrews.

== See also ==
- List of legislation in the United Kingdom
- Records of the Parliaments of Scotland
