= List of acts of the Parliament of Scotland from 1454 =

This is a list of acts of the Parliament of Scotland for the year 1454.

It lists acts of Parliament of the old Parliament of Scotland, that was merged with the old Parliament of England to form the Parliament of Great Britain, by the Union with England Act 1707 (c. 7).

For other years, see list of acts of the Parliament of Scotland. For the period after 1707, see list of acts of the Parliament of Great Britain.

== 1454 ==
The 10th parliament of James II, held in Edinburgh on 16 July 1454.

Short title, or popular name	Citation	Royal assent
Long title
Criminal Law Act 1454 (repealed)	1454 c. 1 (Note: This is the citation in the Record Edition.) — (Note: This act is not listed in the Duodecimal Edition.)	16 July 1454
Of the statutis anent the keping and execucione of Justice. Of the statutes about the keeping and execution of justice. (Repealed by Statute Law Revision (Scotland) Act 1906 (6 Edw. 7. c. 38))
Food Act 1454 (repealed)	1454 c. 2; 1454 c. 40 (Note: This is the citation in the Duodecimal Edition.)	16 July 1454
For the inbringing of wittalis. For the importing of victuals. (Repealed by Statute Law Revision (Scotland) Act 1906 (6 Edw. 7. c. 38))

=== Sources ===
- Alexander, William (1841). "Acta Parliamentorum Regis Jacobi Secundi". An Abridgement of the Acts of the Parliaments of Scotland. Edinburgh: Adam and Charles Black. p. 441 – via Google Books.
- Alexander, William (1841). "Acta Parliamentorum Regis Jacobi Secundi". An Abridgement of the Acts of the Parliaments of Scotland. Edinburgh: Adam and Charles Black. p. 441 – via Google Books.
- Chronological Table of the Statutes. London: Her Majesty's Stationery Office. 1972. p. 1318 – via Google Books.
- "Index of Statutes: James II (1437-1460)". Records of the Parliaments of Scotland to 1707. University of St Andrews.

== See also ==
- List of legislation in the United Kingdom
- Records of the Parliaments of Scotland
