= List of acts of the Parliament of Scotland from 1434 =

This is a list of acts of the Parliament of Scotland for the year 1434.

It lists acts of Parliament of the old Parliament of Scotland, that was merged with the old Parliament of England to form the Parliament of Great Britain, by the Union with England Act 1707 (c. 7).

For other years, see list of acts of the Parliament of Scotland. For the period after 1707, see list of acts of the Parliament of Great Britain.

== 1434 ==
The 12th parliament of James I, held in Perth on 10 January 1435.

Short title, or popular name	Citation	Royal assent
Long title
Earldom of March Act 1434 Not public and general	1434 c. 1 (Note: This is the citation in the Record Edition.); 1434 c. 135 (Note: This is the citation in the Duodecimal Edition.)	10 January 1435
Decretum super jure proprietatis terrarum comitatus de March et dominii de Dunbar. Decree concerning the right of ownership of the lands of the county of March and the lordship of Dunbar.
Fealty to Queen Act 1434 (repealed)	1434 c. 2; 1434 c. 136	10 January 1435
De literis retinencie et fidelitatis dandis Domine Regine. Of the letters you will give with restraint and fidelity to the Queen. (Repealed by Statute Law Revision (Scotland) Act 1906 (6 Edw. 7. c. 38))

=== Sources ===
- Alexander, William (1841). "Acta Parliamentorum Regis Jacobi Primi". An Abridgement of the Acts of the Parliaments of Scotland. Edinburgh: Adam and Charles Black. p. 440 – via Google Books.
- Alexander, William (1841). "Acta Parliamentorum Regis Jacobi Primi". An Abridgement of the Acts of the Parliaments of Scotland. Edinburgh: Adam and Charles Black. p. 440 – via Google Books.
- Chronological Table of the Statutes. London: Her Majesty's Stationery Office. 1972. p. 1317 – via Google Books.
- "Index of Statutes: James I (1406-1337)". Records of the Parliaments of Scotland to 1707. University of St Andrews.

== See also ==
- List of legislation in the United Kingdom
- Records of the Parliaments of Scotland
