= List of acts of the Parliament of Scotland from 1445 =

This is a list of acts of the Parliament of Scotland for the year 1445.

It lists acts of Parliament of the old Parliament of Scotland, that was merged with the old Parliament of England to form the Parliament of Great Britain, by the Union with England Act 1707 (c. 7).

For other years, see list of acts of the Parliament of Scotland. For the period after 1707, see list of acts of the Parliament of Great Britain.

== 1445 ==
The 5th parliament of James II, held in Perth/Edinburgh on 14 June 1445.

Short title, or popular name	Citation	Royal assent
Long title
Crown Lands Act 1445 (repealed)	Vol. II, p. 33 (Note: This is the citation in the Record Edition.) — (Note: This act is not listed in the Duodecimal Edition.)	14 June 1445
(Repealed by Statute Law Revision (Scotland) Act 1906 (6 Edw. 7. c. 38))

=== Sources ===
- Chronological Table of the Statutes. London: Her Majesty's Stationery Office. 1972. p. 1317 – via Google Books.
- "Index of Statutes: James II (1437-1460)". Records of the Parliaments of Scotland to 1707. University of St Andrews.

== See also ==
- List of legislation in the United Kingdom
- Records of the Parliaments of Scotland
