= List of acts of the Parliament of Scotland from 1578 =

This is a list of acts of the Parliament of Scotland for the year 1578.

It lists acts of Parliament of the old Parliament of Scotland, that was merged with the old Parliament of England to form the Parliament of Great Britain, by the Union with England Act 1707 (c. 7).

For other years, see list of acts of the Parliament of Scotland. For the period after 1707, see list of acts of the Parliament of Great Britain.

== 1578 ==
The 5th parliament of James VI.

Short title, or popular name	Citation	Royal assent
Long title
Freedom of Parliament Act 1578 (repealed)	1578 c. 1 (Note: This is the citation in the Record Edition.) — (Note: This act is not listed in the Duodecimal Edition.)	25 July 1578
The Declaratioun off the king and estaitis of the fredome of this parliament. (Repealed by Statute Law Revision (Scotland) Act 1906 (6 Edw. 7. c. 38))
Regent Act 1578 (repealed)	1578 c. 2 —	25 July 1578
The ratificatioun of the acceptatioun of the regiment wpoun the kingis majestie in his awne persoun. (Repealed by Statute Law Revision (Scotland) Act 1906 (6 Edw. 7. c. 38))
Church Act 1578 (repealed)	1578 c. 3 —	25 July 1578
The ratificatioun of the libertie of the trew kirk of God and religioun. (Repealed by Statute Law Revision (Scotland) Act 1906 (6 Edw. 7. c. 38))
Election of King's Council Act 1578 (repealed)	1578 c. 4 —	25 July 1578
The nominatioun and electioun of the kingis majesteis counsall. (Repealed by Statute Law Revision (Scotland) Act 1906 (6 Edw. 7. c. 38))
Universities and Colleges Act 1578 (repealed)	1578 c. 5 —	25 July 1578
Anent the visitatioun of the universiteis and collegis. (Repealed by Statute Law Revision (Scotland) Act 1906 (6 Edw. 7. c. 38))
Glebes Act 1578 (repealed)	1578 c. 6; 1578 c. 62 (Note: This is the citation in the Duodecimal Edition.)	25 July 1578
The gleibis of the ministeris and redaris salbe frie of thair teyndis. (Repealed by Statute Law Revision (Scotland) Act 1964 (c. 80))
Hospitals Act 1578 (repealed)	1578 c. 7; 1578 c. 63	25 July 1578
Anent the visitatioun of the hospitallis. (Repealed by Statute Law Revision (Scotland) Act 1906 (6 Edw. 7. c. 38))
Not public and general	1578 c. 8 —	25 July 1578
The discharge grantit to James erll of Mortoun of the administratioun of his regiment castell of Edinburgh munitioun Jowallis and utheris being thairin.
Not public and general	1578 c. 9 —	25 July 1578
The exoneratioun and discharge of umquhile Johnne erll of Mar that last deceissit.
Not public and general	1578 c. 10 —	25 July 1578
The declaratioun of oure Soverane lord and estaittis anent the keping of the castell of Striviling and attendance upoun our Soverane lordis maist noble persone be Johnne now erll of Mar.
Burghs Act 1578 still in force	1578 c. 11; 1578 c. 64	25 July 1578
The Ratificatioun of the preuilegis of burrowis with additioun.
Darnley's Murderers Act 1578 (repealed)	1578 c. 12; 1578 c. 65	25 July 1578
The ratificatioun of ane act maid of befoir anent the alienatioun of landis and dimissioun of benefices be thame that salhappin to be convict or ar of the murtheris of our Soverane lordis fader and of his twa regentis. (Repealed by Statute Law Revision (Scotland) Act 1906 (6 Edw. 7. c. 38))
Crown Lands Act 1578 (repealed)	1578 c. 13; 1578 c. 66	25 July 1578
Anent dowbill confirmationis of fewis of kirk-landis and landis haldin immediatlie of our Soverane lord. (Repealed by Statute Law Revision (Scotland) Act 1964 (c. 80))
Not public and general	1578 c. 14 —	25 July 1578
Anent the alteratioun of the fair of the burgh of Irwin.
Flesh Act 1578 (repealed)	1578 c. 15; 1578 c. 67	25 July 1578
Ane act anent the careing of flesche furth of this realme in schippis under cullour of victualling. (Repealed by Statute Law Revision (Scotland) Act 1906 (6 Edw. 7. c. 38))
Vacation Act 1578 (repealed)	1578 c. 16 —	25 July 1578
Ane act anent changing of vacance. (Repealed by Statute Law Revision (Scotland) Act 1906 (6 Edw. 7. c. 38))
Commissary Courts Act 1578 (repealed)	1578 c. 17 —	25 July 1578
Ane commissioun to certane noblemen to treat with the lordis of Sessioun upoun the confirmatioun of testamentis and placing of commissaris. (Repealed by Statute Law Revision (Scotland) Act 1906 (6 Edw. 7. c. 38))
Commission on Law Act 1578 (repealed)	1578 c. 18 —	25 July 1578
Ane uther commissioun to treat upoun the lawes. (Repealed by Statute Law Revision (Scotland) Act 1906 (6 Edw. 7. c. 38))
Church Act 1578 (repealed)	1578 c. 19 —	25 July 1578
Anent the policie of the kirk. (Repealed by Statute Law Revision (Scotland) Act 1906 (6 Edw. 7. c. 38))
Not public and general	1578 c. 20 —	25 July 1578
Ane ratificatioun of the gift maid to the provest of Sanetsalvatouris college.
Not public and general	1578 c. 21 —	25 July 1578
Ane letre of pensioun grantit to the countesse of Mar and assignatioun thairof.
Not public and general	1578 c. 22 —	25 July 1578
The ratificatioun of the infeftment maid to the maister of Glencarne of the landis of Boghall and Mylntoun.
Coin Act 1578 (repealed)	1578 c. 23 —	25 July 1578
Ane act maid anent cunyie. (Repealed by Statute Law Revision (Scotland) Act 1906 (6 Edw. 7. c. 38))
Tay Bridge Act 1578 (repealed)	1578 c. 24 —	25 July 1578
Ane act anent the taxatioun of ten thowsand markis to the beting of the brig of Tay. (Repealed by Statute Law Revision (Scotland) Act 1906 (6 Edw. 7. c. 38))
Not public and general	1578 c. 25 —	25 July 1578
The pacificatioun grantit to the lord Home.
Not public and general	1578 c. 26 —	25 July 1578
The pacificatioun grantit to Johnne Cranstoun of Morestoun.
Not public and general	1578 c. 27 —	25 July 1578
Ane pacificatioun grantit to Johnne Maitland of Achingassill.
Not public and general	1578 c. 28 —	25 July 1578
The pacificatioun of Alexander Hepburne of Quhitsum.
Not public and general	1578 c. 29 —	25 July 1578
The pacificatioun of maister Thomas Hepburne persone of Auld Hamestokis.
Not public and general	1578 c. 30 —	25 July 1578
The pacificatioun of capitane Robert Lauder.
Not public and general	1578 c. 31 —	25 July 1578
Ane act concerning Sir David Home of fiswik and the laird Lethington.
Not public and general	1578 c. 32 —	25 July 1578
Ane act concerning the kyndlie tennentis of the bischoprik of Dumblane.
Recognition of Burgh Lands Act 1578 (repealed)	1578 c. 33 —	25 July 1578
Ane act concerning recognitioun of landis within burgh remittit to the lordis appointit for viseing of the lawes. (Repealed by Statute Law Revision (Scotland) Act 1906 (6 Edw. 7. c. 38))
Not public and general	1578 c. 34 —	25 July 1578
Ane Commissioun grantit to certane lordis to decyde in ane caus betuix the Gordounis and the Forbessis.

=== Sources ===
- Alexander, William (1841). "Acta Parliamentorum Regis Jacobi Sexti". An Abridgement of the Acts of the Parliaments of Scotland. Edinburgh: Adam and Charles Black. pp. A22 – A23 – via Google Books.
- Alexander, William (1841). "Acta Parliamentorum Regis Jacobi Sexti". An Abridgement of the Acts of the Parliaments of Scotland. Edinburgh: Adam and Charles Black. pp. A22 – A23 – via Google Books.
- Chronological Table of the Statutes. London: Her Majesty's Stationery Office. 1972. pp. 1335–1336 – via Google Books.
- "Acts of the Old Scottish Parliament: 1578". legislation.gov.uk. The National Archives.
- "Index of Statutes: James VI (1567-1625)". Records of the Parliaments of Scotland to 1707. University of St Andrews.

== See also ==
- List of legislation in the United Kingdom
- Records of the Parliaments of Scotland
