= List of acts of the Parliament of Scotland from 1673 =

This is a list of acts of the Parliament of Scotland for the year 1673.

It lists acts of Parliament of the old Parliament of Scotland, that was merged with the old Parliament of England to form the Parliament of Great Britain, by the Union with England Act 1707 (c. 7).

For other years, see list of acts of the Parliament of Scotland. For the period after 1707, see list of acts of the Parliament of Great Britain.

== 1673 ==
The 4th session of the 2nd parliament of Charles II, held in Edinburgh from 12 November 1673 until 2 December 1673.

Short title, or popular name	Citation	Royal assent
Long title
Salt Act 1673 (repealed)	1673 c. 1 (Note: This is the citation in the Record Edition.) — (Note: This act is not listed in the Duodecimal Edition.)	25 November 1673
Act concerning the preemption and Excise of Salt. Act concerning the preemption and Excise of Salt. (Repealed by Statute Law Revision (Scotland) Act 1906 (6 Edw. 7. c. 38))
Brandy Act 1673 (repealed)	1673 c. 2 —	1 December 1673
Act concerning the Importation and excyse of Brandie. Act concerning the Importation and excise of Brandy. (Repealed by Statute Law Revision (Scotland) Act 1906 (6 Edw. 7. c. 38))
Sumptuary Act 1673 (repealed)	1673 c. 3 —	2 December 1673
Act concerning Apparell. Act concerning Apparel. (Repealed by Statute Law Revision (Scotland) Act 1906 (6 Edw. 7. c. 38))
Tobacco Act 1673 (repealed)	1673 c. 4 —	2 December 1673
Act concerning the Impositione upon Tobacco. Act concerning the Imposition upon Tobacco. (Repealed by Statute Law Revision (Scotland) Act 1906 (6 Edw. 7. c. 38))

=== Sources ===
- Alexander, William (1841). "Acta Parliamentorum Regis Caroli Secundi". An Abridgement of the Acts of the Parliaments of Scotland. Edinburgh: Adam and Charles Black. p. A66 – via Google Books.
- Alexander, William (1841). "Acta Parliamentorum Regis Caroli Secundi". An Abridgement of the Acts of the Parliaments of Scotland. Edinburgh: Adam and Charles Black. p. A66 – via Google Books.
- Chronological Table of the Statutes. London: Her Majesty's Stationery Office. 1972. pp. 1355–1356 – via Google Books.
- "Index of Statutes: Index of Statutes: Charles II (1649-1685)". Records of the Parliaments of Scotland to 1707. University of St Andrews.

== See also ==
- List of legislation in the United Kingdom
- Records of the Parliaments of Scotland
