= List of acts of the Parliament of Scotland from 1504 =

This is a list of acts of the Parliament of Scotland for the year 1504.

It lists acts of Parliament of the old Parliament of Scotland, that was merged with the old Parliament of England to form the Parliament of Great Britain, by the Union with England Act 1707 (c. 7).

For other years, see list of acts of the Parliament of Scotland. For the period after 1707, see list of acts of the Parliament of Great Britain.

== 1504 ==
Continuing the 6th parliament of James IV, held in Edinburgh from 4 June 1504.

Short title, or popular name	Citation	Royal assent
Long title
Not public and general	1504 c. 1 (Note: This is the citation in the Record Edition.) — (Note: This act is not listed in the Duodecimal Edition.)	16 February 1505
Dissolution of the annexatioun of the erledome of Marche in sa far as the barony of Ersiltoun extendis. Dissolution of the annexation of the earldom of March in so far as the barony of Earlston extends.
Not public and general	1504 c. 2 —	16 February 1505
Ratification and creation of new baronys in the erledome of Stratherne. Ratification and creation of new baronies in the earldom of Strathearn.
Not public and general	1504 c. 3 —	16 February 1505
Unioun of the landis of Tulliallane to the stewartry of Strathern. Union of the lands of Tulliallan to the stewartry of Strathearn.
Not public and general	1504 c. 4 —	16 February 1505
Grant to Alexander lord Hume (Note: Alexander Home, 3rd Lord Home.) of the Dene of Cockburnspeth. Grant to Alexander, lord Home, of the Dean of Cockburnspath.
Sheriffdoms Act 1504 (repealed)	1504 c. 5 —	16 February 1505
Anent the divisioun and unioun of schirefdomez. About the division and union of sheriffdoms. (Repealed by Statute Law Revision (Scotland) Act 1906 (6 Edw. 7. c. 38))
Not public and general	1504 c. 6 —	16 February 1505
Confirmation to Michell Balfour of Burley knycht of the landis of Balgarvis. Confirmation to Michael Balfour of Burleigh, knight, of the lands of Balgarvie.
Not public and general	1504 c. 7 —	16 February 1505
Licence till the bischopis of Ergile and thar tennentis to tak haddir and petis. Licence to the bishops of Argyll and their tenants to take heather and peat.
Holyrood House Act 1504 (repealed)	1504 c. 8 —	16 February 1505
Mortification of xx merkis to ane chaplane to sing in the chapell of Halirudehouse. Mortification of 20 merks to a chaplain to sing in the chapel of Holyrood House. (Repealed by Statute Law Revision (Scotland) Act 1906 (6 Edw. 7. c. 38))

=== Sources ===
- Alexander, William (1841). "Acta Parliamentorum Regis Jacobi Quarti". An Abridgement of the Acts of the Parliaments of Scotland. Edinburgh: Adam and Charles Black. p. A14 – via Google Books.
- Alexander, William (1841). "Acta Parliamentorum Regis Jacobi Quarti". An Abridgement of the Acts of the Parliaments of Scotland. Edinburgh: Adam and Charles Black. p. A14 – via Google Books.
- Chronological Table of the Statutes. London: Her Majesty's Stationery Office. 1972. p. 1327 – via Google Books.
- "Index of Statutes: James IV (1488-1513)". Records of the Parliaments of Scotland to 1707. University of St Andrews.

== See also ==
- List of legislation in the United Kingdom
- Records of the Parliaments of Scotland
