= List of acts of the Parliament of Scotland from 1436 =

This is a list of acts of the Parliament of Scotland for the year 1436.

It lists acts of Parliament of the old Parliament of Scotland, that was merged with the old Parliament of England to form the Parliament of Great Britain, by the Union with England Act 1707 (c. 7).

For other years, see list of acts of the Parliament of Scotland. For the period after 1707, see list of acts of the Parliament of Great Britain.

== 1436 ==
A parliament of James I.

Short title, or popular name	Citation	Royal assent
Long title
Thieves Act 1436 (repealed)	1436 c. 1 (Note: This is the citation in the Record Edition.); 1436 c. 137 (Note: This is the citation in the Duodecimal Edition.)	22 October 1436
Anent the selling of thefis be lordis of regalite schireffis or baronis. About the selling of theives by lords of regality, sheriffs or barons. (Repealed by Statute Law Revision (Scotland) Act 1906 (6 Edw. 7. c. 38))
Jury Oath Act 1436 (repealed)	1436 c. 2; 1436 c. 138	22 October 1436
Of the aithe to be maid be assisouris. Of the oaths to be made by the assize. (Repealed by Statute Law Revision (Scotland) Act 1906 (6 Edw. 7. c. 38))
Arrestments Act 1436 (repealed)	1436 c. 3; 1436 c. 139	22 October 1436
Of arrestmentis be crownaris at Justice airis. Of arrestments by coroners at Justice ayres. (Repealed by Statute Law Revision (Scotland) Act 1906 (6 Edw. 7. c. 38))
Pursuit by Sheriffs Act 1436 (repealed)	1436 c. 4; 1436 c. 140	22 October 1436
Of arrestment and persute of trespassouris be schireffis in the kingis name. Of arrestand pursuit of trespassers by sheriffs in the king's name. (Repealed by Statute Law Revision (Scotland) Act 1906 (6 Edw. 7. c. 38))
Englishmen Act 1436 (repealed)	1436 c. 5; 1436 c. 141	22 October 1436
Of assoverance and proteccion be Inglismen. Of assurance and protection by Englishmen. (Repealed by Statute Law Revision (Scotland) Act 1906 (6 Edw. 7. c. 38))
Thieves (No. 2) Act 1436 (repealed)	1436 c. 6; 1436 c. 142	22 October 1436
Of the setting of courtis for juging of thevis. Of the setting of courts for judging of theives. (Repealed by Statute Law Revision (Scotland) Act 1906 (6 Edw. 7. c. 38))
Import of Bullion Act 1436 (repealed)	1436 c. 7; 1436 c. 143	22 October 1436
Of the inbringing of bulyeon be merchandis. Of the importation of bullion by merchants. (Repealed by Statute Law Revision (Scotland) Act 1906 (6 Edw. 7. c. 38))
Taverns Act 1436 (repealed)	1436 c. 8; 1436 c. 144	22 October 1436
Of the tavernaris in the nicht. Of the naverners in the night. (Repealed by Statute Law Revision (Scotland) Act 1906 (6 Edw. 7. c. 38))
English Cloth Act 1436 (repealed)	1436 c. 9; 1436 c. 145	22 October 1436
Anent Inglis clath and uthir gudis. About English cloth and other goods. (Repealed by Statute Law Revision (Scotland) Act 1906 (6 Edw. 7. c. 38))
Selling Salmon to English Men Act 1436 (repealed)	1436 c. 10; 1436 c. 146	22 October 1436
Tuiching the selling of salmonde to Inglis men. Touching the selling of salmon to Englishmen. (Repealed by Statute Law Revision (Scotland) Act 1906 (6 Edw. 7. c. 38))
Flemish Wine Trade Act 1436 (repealed)	1436 c. 11; 1436 c. 147	22 October 1436
Of bying of wyne fra Flemyngis of the Dam. Of buying wine from Flemings of the Dane. (Repealed by Statute Law Revision (Scotland) Act 1906 (6 Edw. 7. c. 38))
Place of Trial Act 1436 (repealed)	1436 c. 12; 1436 c. 148	22 October 1436
That the kingis Justice hald the law quhair the trespes wes done. That the king's Justice hold the law where the wrongdoing was done. (Repealed by Statute Law Revision (Scotland) Act 1906 (6 Edw. 7. c. 38))
Gold, Silver and Jewels Act 1436 (repealed)	1436 c. 13; 1436 c. 149	22 October 1436
Of golde silver and jowalis. Of gold, silver and jewels. (Repealed by Statute Law Revision (Scotland) Act 1906 (6 Edw. 7. c. 38))

=== Sources ===
- Alexander, William (1841). "Acta Parliamentorum Regis Jacobi Primi". An Abridgement of the Acts of the Parliaments of Scotland. Edinburgh: Adam and Charles Black. p. 440 – via Google Books.
- Alexander, William (1841). "Acta Parliamentorum Regis Jacobi Primi". An Abridgement of the Acts of the Parliaments of Scotland. Edinburgh: Adam and Charles Black. p. 440 – via Google Books.
- Chronological Table of the Statutes. London: Her Majesty's Stationery Office. 1972. p. 1317 – via Google Books.
- "Index of Statutes: James I (1406-1337)". Records of the Parliaments of Scotland to 1707. University of St Andrews.

== See also ==
- List of legislation in the United Kingdom
- Records of the Parliaments of Scotland
