= List of acts of the Parliament of Scotland from 1476 =

This is a list of acts of the Parliament of Scotland for the year 1476.

It lists acts of Parliament of the old Parliament of Scotland, that was merged with the old Parliament of England to form the Parliament of Great Britain, by the Union with England Act 1707 (c. 7).

For other years, see list of acts of the Parliament of Scotland. For the period after 1707, see list of acts of the Parliament of Great Britain.

== 1476 ==
The 9th parliament of James III.

Short title, or popular name	Citation	Royal assent
Long title
Crown Lands Act 1476 (repealed)	Vol. II, p. 113 (Note: This is the citation in the Record Edition.); 1476 c. 70 (Note: This is the citation in the Duodecimal Edition.)	10 July 1476
(Repealed by Statute Law Revision (Scotland) Act 1906 (6 Edw. 7. c. 38))
Crown Lands (No. 2) Act 1476 Not public and general	Vol. II, p. 113; 1476 c. 71	10 July 1476
Continuation of Parliament Act 1476 (repealed)	Vol. II, p. 114 — (Note: This act is not listed in the Duodecimal Edition.)	10 July 1476
Continuato parliamenti. Continuation of parliament. (Repealed by Statute Law Revision (Scotland) Act 1906 (6 Edw. 7. c. 38))

=== Sources ===
- Chronological Table of the Statutes. London: Her Majesty's Stationery Office. 1972. p. 1322 – via Google Books.
- "Index of Statutes: James III (1460-1488)". Records of the Parliaments of Scotland to 1707. University of St Andrews.

== See also ==
- List of legislation in the United Kingdom
- Records of the Parliaments of Scotland
