= List of acts of the Parliament of Scotland from 1440 =

This is a list of acts of the Parliament of Scotland for the year 1440.

It lists acts of Parliament of the old Parliament of Scotland, that was merged with the old Parliament of England to form the Parliament of Great Britain, by the Union with England Act 1707 (c. 7).

For other years, see list of acts of the Parliament of Scotland. For the period after 1707, see list of acts of the Parliament of Great Britain.

== 1440 ==
The 3rd parliament of James II, a general council held in Stirling from 2 August 1440 until 10 August 1440.

Short title, or popular name	Citation	Royal assent
Long title
Church Act 1440 (repealed)	1440 c. 1 (Note: This is the citation in the Record Edition.); 1440 c. 4 (Note: This is the citation in the Duodecimal Edition.)	5 August 1440
Of the fredome of haly kirk. Of the freedom of the holy church. (Repealed by Statute Law Revision (Scotland) Act 1906 (6 Edw. 7. c. 38))
Circuit Courts Act 1440 (repealed)	1440 c. 2; 1440 c. 5	5 August 1440
Of Justice airis to be haldin twise in the yere. Of Justice ayres to be held twice in the year. (Repealed by Statute Law Revision (Scotland) Act 1906 (6 Edw. 7. c. 38))
Crimes Act 1440 (repealed)	1440 c. 3; 1440 c. 6	5 August 1440
Of remede and punicioun of crymls. Of remedy and punishment of crimes. (Repealed by Statute Law Revision (Scotland) Act 1906 (6 Edw. 7. c. 38))

=== Sources ===
- Alexander, William (1841). "Acta Parliamentorum Regis Jacobi Secundi". An Abridgement of the Acts of the Parliaments of Scotland. Edinburgh: Adam and Charles Black. p. 440 – via Google Books.
- Alexander, William (1841). "Acta Parliamentorum Regis Jacobi Secundi". An Abridgement of the Acts of the Parliaments of Scotland. Edinburgh: Adam and Charles Black. p. 440 – via Google Books.
- Chronological Table of the Statutes. London: Her Majesty's Stationery Office. 1972. p. 1317 – via Google Books.
- "Index of Statutes: James II (1437-1460)". Records of the Parliaments of Scotland to 1707. University of St Andrews.
