= List of acts of the Parliament of Scotland from 1478 =

This is a list of acts of the Parliament of Scotland for the year 1478.

It lists acts of Parliament of the old Parliament of Scotland, that was merged with the old Parliament of England to form the Parliament of Great Britain, by the Union with England Act 1707 (c. 7).

For other years, see list of acts of the Parliament of Scotland. For the period after 1707, see list of acts of the Parliament of Great Britain.

== 1478 ==
The 10th parliament of James III.

Short title, or popular name	Citation	Royal assent
Long title
Church Act 1478 (repealed)	1478 c. 1 (Note: This is the citation in the Record Edition.) — (Note: This act is not listed in the Duodecimal Edition.)	12 June 1478
Of the fredome of halikirk. Of the freedom of the holy church. (Repealed by Statute Law Revision (Scotland) Act 1906 (6 Edw. 7. c. 38))
Remissions Act 1478 (repealed)	1478 c. 2 —	12 June 1478
Of the granting of remissiounis and respettis for slauchter. Of the granting of remissions and respites for murder. (Repealed by Statute Law Revision (Scotland) Act 1906 (6 Edw. 7. c. 38))
Coin Act 1478 (repealed)	1478 c. 3 —	12 June 1478
Of the striking of cunye and of bulyeoun. Of the striking of coin and of bullion. (Repealed by Statute Law Revision (Scotland) Act 1906 (6 Edw. 7. c. 38))
Embassy to Burgundy Act 1478 (repealed)	1478 c. 4 —	12 June 1478
Of an ambassiate to the Duk of Burgunye to get confirmacion of the privilegis grantit to the merchandis of this realme of befor. Of an embassy to the Duke of Burgundy to get confirmation of the privileges previously granted to the merchants of this realm. (Repealed by Statute Law Revision (Scotland) Act 1906 (6 Edw. 7. c. 38))
Imports Act 1478 (repealed)	1478 c. 5; 1478 c. 72 (Note: This is the citation in the Duodecimal Edition.)	12 June 1478
For inbringing of vitalis and uthir lauchful merchandice in the realme. For the importation of victuals and other legal merchandise into the realm. (Repealed by Statute Law Revision (Scotland) Act 1906 (6 Edw. 7. c. 38))
Salmon Act 1478 (repealed)	1478 c. 6; 1478 c. 73	12 June 1478
For observing of the act (Note: (Act of James I)?) anent the cruvis sett in watteris. For observing of the act regarding the cruives set in waters. (Repealed by Statute Law Revision (Scotland) Act 1906 (6 Edw. 7. c. 38))
Ferries Act 1478 (repealed)	1478 c. 7; 1478 c. 74	12 June 1478
Anent the feriaris that rasis fraucht uppoune the kingis liegis. Regarding the ferrymen who raise the fare upon the king's subjects. (Repealed by Statute Law Revision (Scotland) Act 1906 (6 Edw. 7. c. 38))
Muirburn Act 1478 (repealed)	1478 c. 8; 1478 c. 75	12 June 1478
Anent the murburne. Regarding the muir-burning. (Repealed by Statute Law Revision (Scotland) Act 1906 (6 Edw. 7. c. 38))
Salmon (No. 2) Act 1478 (repealed)	1478 c. 9; 1478 c. 76	12 June 1478
Of the bind of salmonde. Of the bind of salmon. (Repealed by Statute Law Revision (Scotland) Act 1906 (6 Edw. 7. c. 38))
Beggars and Sorners Act 1478 (repealed)	1478 c. 10; 1478 c. 77	12 June 1478
Of masterfull beggaris and sornaris. Of overbearing beggars and sorners. (Repealed by Statute Law Revision (Scotland) Act 1906 (6 Edw. 7. c. 38))
Horse Shoeing Act 1478 (repealed)	1478 c. 11; 1478 c. 78	12 June 1478
Of schoyn of hors in the quyk be ignorant smethis. Of careless shoeing of horses by ignorant smiths. (Repealed by Statute Law Revision (Scotland) Act 1906 (6 Edw. 7. c. 38))
Committee of Parliament Act 1478 (repealed)	1478 c. 12 —	12 June 1478
The power of the Parliament committit to certane persons of the thre estatis. The power of the Parliament committed to certain persons of the three estates. (Repealed by Statute Law Revision (Scotland) Act 1906 (6 Edw. 7. c. 38))

=== Sources ===
- Alexander, William (1841). "Acta Parliamentorum Regis Jacobi Tertii". An Abridgement of the Acts of the Parliaments of Scotland. Edinburgh: Adam and Charles Black. p. 444 – via Google Books.
- Alexander, William (1841). "Acta Parliamentorum Regis Jacobi Tertii". An Abridgement of the Acts of the Parliaments of Scotland. Edinburgh: Adam and Charles Black. p. 444 – via Google Books.
- Chronological Table of the Statutes. London: Her Majesty's Stationery Office. 1972. p. 1322 – via Google Books.
- "Index of Statutes: James III (1460-1488)". Records of the Parliaments of Scotland to 1707. University of St Andrews.

== See also ==
- List of legislation in the United Kingdom
- Records of the Parliaments of Scotland
