= List of acts of the Parliament of Scotland from 1468 =

This is a list of acts of the Parliament of Scotland for the year 1468.

It lists acts of Parliament of the old Parliament of Scotland, that was merged with the old Parliament of England to form the Parliament of Great Britain, by the Union with England Act 1707 (c. 7).

For other years, see list of acts of the Parliament of Scotland. For the period after 1707, see list of acts of the Parliament of Great Britain.

== 1468 ==
Continuing the 5th parliament of James III, held in Edinburgh.

Short title, or popular name	Citation	Royal assent
Long title
Currency Act 1468 (repealed)	1468 c. 1 (Note: This is the citation in the Record Edition.); 1467 c. 23 (Note: This is the citation in the Duodecimal Edition.)	1468
Anent the mone. About the money. (Repealed by Statute Law Revision (Scotland) Act 1906 (6 Edw. 7. c. 38))
Session Act 1468 (repealed)	1468 c. 2 — (Note: This act is not listed in the Duodecimal Edition.)	1468
Of the Sessione. Of the Session. (Repealed by Statute Law Revision (Scotland) Act 1906 (6 Edw. 7. c. 38))
Export of Cattle Act 1468 (repealed)	1468 c. 3; 1467 1467 c. 24	1468
That na catel be sellit out of the realme. That no cattle be sold out of the realm. (Repealed by Statute Law Revision (Scotland) Act 1906 (6 Edw. 7. c. 38))
Sessions of Parliament Act 1468 (repealed)	1468 c. 4 —	1468
That thar salbe bot twa sessiounisane—in edinburgh and ane in perth. That there shall be only two sessions: one in Edinburgh and one in Perth. (Repealed by Statute Law Revision (Scotland) Act 1906 (6 Edw. 7. c. 38))
Circuit Courts Act 1468 (repealed)	1468 c. 5 —	1468
For authorizing of Justice aris set in feriale tyme. (Note: Feriat time is the time in which it is not lawful for courts to be held.); For authorising of Justice ayres set in feriat time. (Repealed by Statute Law Revision (Scotland) Act 1906 (6 Edw. 7. c. 38))
Fines imposed by Session Act 1468 (repealed)	1468 c. 6 —	1468
Of the unlawis of the session. Of the penalties of the session. Repealed by Statute Law Revision (Scotland) Act 1906 (6 Edw. 7. c. 38))
Vacancies in Lords of Session Act 1468 (repealed)	1468 c. 7 —	1468
The king and his consale to chese utheris in case ony of the personis nemmyt to the sessiouns be seeke or absent. The king and his council to chose others in case any of the persons named to the sessions be ill or absent. Repealed by Statute Law Revision (Scotland) Act 1906 (6 Edw. 7. c. 38))

=== Sources ===
- Alexander, William (1841). "Acta Parliamentorum Regis Jacobi Tertii". An Abridgement of the Acts of the Parliaments of Scotland. Edinburgh: Adam and Charles Black. p. 443 – via Google Books.
- Alexander, William (1841). "Acta Parliamentorum Regis Jacobi Tertii". An Abridgement of the Acts of the Parliaments of Scotland. Edinburgh: Adam and Charles Black. p. 443 – via Google Books.
- Chronological Table of the Statutes. London: Her Majesty's Stationery Office. 1972. pp. 1319–1320 – via Google Books.
- "Index of Statutes: James III (1460-1488)". Records of the Parliaments of Scotland to 1707. University of St Andrews.

== See also ==
- List of legislation in the United Kingdom
- Records of the Parliaments of Scotland
