= List of acts of the Parliament of Scotland from 1557 =

This is a list of acts of the Parliament of Scotland for the year 1557.

It lists acts of Parliament of the old Parliament of Scotland, that was merged with the old Parliament of England to form the Parliament of Great Britain, by the Union with England Act 1707 (c. 7).

For other years, see list of acts of the Parliament of Scotland. For the period after 1707, see list of acts of the Parliament of Great Britain.

== 1557 ==
The 7th parliament of Mary.

Short title, or popular name	Citation	Royal assent
Long title
Commissioners to France Act 1557 (repealed)	1557 c. 1 (Note: This is the citation in the Record Edition.) — (Note: This act is not listed in the Duodecimal Edition.)	14 December 1557
Anent the ransounis of the commissionaris to pas in France in cais ony of thaim be taikin. (Repealed by Statute Law Revision (Scotland) Act 1906 (6 Edw. 7. c. 38))
Commissioners to France (No. 2) Act 1557 (repealed)	1557 c. 2 —	14 December 1557
Dispositioun of the wairdis mariageis nonentres benefices and takkis vacand throuch the deceis of ony of the saidis commissionaris. (Repealed by Statute Law Revision (Scotland) Act 1906 (6 Edw. 7. c. 38))
Commissioners to France (No. 3) Act 1557 (repealed)	1557 c. 3 —	14 December 1557
Supersedere of all actiounis aganis the saidis commissionaris. (Repealed by Statute Law Revision (Scotland) Act 1906 (6 Edw. 7. c. 38))
Caution in Improbations Act 1557 (repealed)	1557 c. 4; 1557 c. 62 (Note: This is the citation in the Duodecimal Edition.)	14 December 1557
Anent the finding of cautioun in materis of improbatioun. (Repealed by Statute Law Revision (Scotland) Act 1906 (6 Edw. 7. c. 38))
Exceptions Act 1557 (repealed)	1557 c. 5; 1557 c. 63	14 December 1557
Anent the probatioun of exceptiounis. (Repealed by Statute Law Revision (Scotland) Act 1906 (6 Edw. 7. c. 38))
Expenses of Process Act 1557 (repealed)	1557 c. 6; 1557 c. 64	14 December 1557
The expensis of pley to be taxt and soumit in the principall decrettis. (Repealed by Statute Law Revision (Scotland) Act 1906 (6 Edw. 7. c. 38))

=== Sources ===
- Alexander, William (1841). "Acta Parliamentorum Mariæ Reginæ". An Abridgement of the Acts of the Parliaments of Scotland. Edinburgh: Adam and Charles Black. p. A19 – via Google Books.
- Alexander, William (1841). "Acta Parliamentorum Mariæ Reginæ". An Abridgement of the Acts of the Parliaments of Scotland. Edinburgh: Adam and Charles Black. p. A19 – via Google Books.
- Chronological Table of the Statutes. London: Her Majesty's Stationery Office. 1972. p. 1333 – via Google Books.
- "Index of Statutes: Mary I (1542-1567)". Records of the Parliaments of Scotland to 1707. University of St Andrews.

== See also ==
- List of legislation in the United Kingdom
- Records of the Parliaments of Scotland
