= List of acts of the Parliament of Scotland from 1475 =

This is a list of acts of the Parliament of Scotland for the year 1475.

It lists acts of Parliament of the old Parliament of Scotland, that was merged with the old Parliament of England to form the Parliament of Great Britain, by the Union with England Act 1707 (c. 7).

For other years, see list of acts of the Parliament of Scotland. For the period after 1707, see list of acts of the Parliament of Great Britain.

== 1475 ==
The 8th parliament of James III.

Short title, or popular name	Citation	Royal assent
Long title
Church Act 1475 (repealed)	1475 c. 1 (Note: This is the citation in the Record Edition.) — (Note: This act is not listed in the Duodecimal Edition.)	20 November 1475
Of the fredome of haly kirk. Of the freedom of the holy church. (Repealed by Statute Law Revision (Scotland) Act 1906 (6 Edw. 7. c. 38))
Circuit Courts Act 1475 (repealed)	1475 c. 2 —	20 November 1475
Of Justice aris to be set twise in the yer and of the executioun of the act anent fugitivis to the girth, &c. Of Justice ayres to be set twice in the year, and of the execution of the act regarding fugitives to sanctuary, etc. (Repealed by Statute Law Revision (Scotland) Act 1906 (6 Edw. 7. c. 38))
Civil Causes Act 1475 (repealed)	1475 c. 3; 1475 c. 62 (Note: This is the citation in the Duodecimal Edition.)	20 November 1475
Anent the administracione of Justice in civile accions and complantis. Regarding the administration of Justice in civil actions and complaints. (Repealed by Statute Law Revision (Scotland) Act 1906 (6 Edw. 7. c. 38))
Criminal Juries Act 1475 (repealed)	1475 c. 4; 1475 c. 63	20 November 1475
Twiching the reformacione of fals assisis passand upone criminale accions. Touching the redress of false assizes being passed on criminal actions. (Repealed by Statute Law Revision (Scotland) Act 1906 (6 Edw. 7. c. 38))
Royal Marriage Act 1475 (repealed)	1475 c. 5 —	20 November 1475
Anent the mariage of our soverane lordis sistir. Regarding the marriage of our sovereign lord's sister. (Repealed by Statute Law Revision (Scotland) Act 1906 (6 Edw. 7. c. 38))
Currency Act 1475 (repealed)	1475 c. 6; 1475 c. 64	20 November 1475
Anent the money. About the money. (Repealed by Statute Law Revision (Scotland) Act 1906 (6 Edw. 7. c. 38))
Coin Act 1475 (repealed)	1475 c. 7; 1475 c. 65	20 November 1475
That cunyit money be not put to the fire to be maid bulyone. That coined money not to be smelted for bullion. (Repealed by Statute Law Revision (Scotland) Act 1906 (6 Edw. 7. c. 38))
Brieves of Idiotry Act 1475 (repealed)	1475 c. 8; 1475 c. 66	20 November 1475
Anent the brief of Idiotrie and furiosite. About the brieve of Idiocity and insanity. (Repealed by Statute Law Revision (Scotland) Act 1906 (6 Edw. 7. c. 38))
Currency (No. 2) Act 1475 (repealed)	1475 c. 9; 1475 c. 67	20 November 1475
Of the cours of the money. Of the circulation of the money. (Repealed by Statute Law Revision (Scotland) Act 1906 (6 Edw. 7. c. 38))
Currency (No. 3) Act 1475 (repealed)	1475 c. 10; 1475 c. 68	20 November 1475
Of the payment of dettis according to the former cours of the money. Of the payment of debts according to the former value of the money. (Repealed by Statute Law Revision (Scotland) Act 1906 (6 Edw. 7. c. 38))
Courts of Guerra Act 1475 (repealed)	1475 c. 11; 1475 c. 69	20 November 1475
Of courtis of guerra. Of courts of enquiry. (Repealed by Statute Law Revision (Scotland) Act 1906 (6 Edw. 7. c. 38))

=== Sources ===
- Alexander, William (1841). "Acta Parliamentorum Regis Jacobi Tertii". An Abridgement of the Acts of the Parliaments of Scotland. Edinburgh: Adam and Charles Black. p. 444 – via Google Books.
- Alexander, William (1841). "Acta Parliamentorum Regis Jacobi Tertii". An Abridgement of the Acts of the Parliaments of Scotland. Edinburgh: Adam and Charles Black. p. 444 – via Google Books.
- Chronological Table of the Statutes. London: Her Majesty's Stationery Office. 1972. p. 1322 – via Google Books.
- "Index of Statutes: James III (1460-1488)". Records of the Parliaments of Scotland to 1707. University of St Andrews.

== See also ==
- List of legislation in the United Kingdom
- Records of the Parliaments of Scotland
