= List of acts of the Parliament of Scotland from 1564 =

This is a list of acts of the Parliament of Scotland for the year 1564.

It lists acts of Parliament of the old Parliament of Scotland, that was merged with the old Parliament of England to form the Parliament of Great Britain, by the Union with England Act 1707 (c. 7).

For other years, see list of acts of the Parliament of Scotland. For the period after 1707, see list of acts of the Parliament of Great Britain.

== 1564 ==
The 10th parliament of Mary.

Short title, or popular name	Citation	Royal assent
Long title
Queen's Majority Act 1564 (repealed)	c. 1 (Note: This is the citation in the Record Edition.) c. 87 (Note: This is the citation in the Duodecimal Edition.)	15 December 1564
Declaratioun of our soverane ladyis lauchfull and perfyte age. Declaration of our sovereign lady's lawful and perfect age. (Repealed by Statute Law Revision (Scotland) Act 1906 (6 Edw. 7. c. 38))
Church Lands Act 1564 (repealed)	c. 2 c. 88	15 December 1564
Anent confirmatiounis of infeftmentis of few-ferme of kirklandis. Regarding confirmation of infeftments of feu-farm of church lands. (Repealed by Statute Law Revision (Scotland) Act 1906 (6 Edw. 7. c. 38))

=== Sources ===
- Alexander, William (1841). "Acta Parliamentorum Mariæ Reginæ". An Abridgement of the Acts of the Parliaments of Scotland. Edinburgh: Adam and Charles Black. p. A20 – via Google Books.
- Alexander, William (1841). "Acta Parliamentorum Mariæ Reginæ". An Abridgement of the Acts of the Parliaments of Scotland. Edinburgh: Adam and Charles Black. p. A20 – via Google Books.
- Chronological Table of the Statutes. London: Her Majesty's Stationery Office. 1972. p. 1334 – via Google Books.
- "Index of Statutes: Mary I (1542-1567)". Records of the Parliaments of Scotland to 1707. University of St Andrews.

== See also ==
- List of legislation in the United Kingdom
- Records of the Parliaments of Scotland
