= List of acts of the Parliament of Scotland from 1431 =

This is a list of acts of the Parliament of Scotland for the year 1431.

It lists acts of Parliament of the old Parliament of Scotland, that was merged with the old Parliament of England to form the Parliament of Great Britain, by the Union with England Act 1707 (c. 7).

For other years, see list of acts of the Parliament of Scotland. For the period after 1707, see list of acts of the Parliament of Great Britain.

== 1431 ==
The 10th parliament of James I, held in Perth.

Short title, or popular name	Citation	Royal assent
Long title
Supply Act 1431 (repealed)	1431 c. 1 (Note: This is the citation in the Record Edition.) — (Note: This act is not listed in the Duodecimal Edition.)	16 October 1431
Of a contribucion to be rasit for the resisting of the rebellouris in the north lande. Of a contribution to be raised for resisting the rebels in the north lands. (Repealed by Statute Law Revision (Scotland) Act 1906 (6 Edw. 7. c. 38))
Salmon Act 1431 (repealed)	1431 c. 2; 1431 c. 132 (Note: This is the citation in the Duodecimal Edition.)	16 October 1431
Anent the selling or barteryng of salmonde out of the realme. About the selling or bartering of salmon out of the realm. (Repealed by Statute Law Revision (Scotland) Act 1906 (6 Edw. 7. c. 38))
Treason Act 1431 (repealed)	1431 c. 3 —	16 October 1431
Anent thaim that passit nocht with the king in the north cuntre againis his rebellouris. About them that pass not with the king in the north country against his rebels. (Repealed by Statute Law Revision (Scotland) Act 1906 (6 Edw. 7. c. 38))
Alienation of Crown Lands Act 1431 (repealed)	1431 c. 4; 1431 c. 133	16 October 1431
Of the analying of landis fra the croune the governour of the realme be. Of the alienation of lands from the crown the governor of the realm be. (Repealed by Statute Law Revision (Scotland) Act 1906 (6 Edw. 7. c. 38))

=== Sources ===
- Alexander, William (1841). "Acta Parliamentorum Regis Jacobi Primi". An Abridgement of the Acts of the Parliaments of Scotland. Edinburgh: Adam and Charles Black. p. 439 – via Google Books.
- Alexander, William (1841). "Acta Parliamentorum Regis Jacobi Primi". An Abridgement of the Acts of the Parliaments of Scotland. Edinburgh: Adam and Charles Black. p. 439 – via Google Books.
- Chronological Table of the Statutes. London: Her Majesty's Stationery Office. 1972. p. 1316 – via Google Books.
- "Index of Statutes: James I (1406-1337)". Records of the Parliaments of Scotland to 1707. University of St Andrews.

== See also ==
- List of legislation in the United Kingdom
- Records of the Parliaments of Scotland
