= List of acts of the Parliament of Scotland from 1515 =

This is a list of acts of the Parliament of Scotland for the year 1515.

It lists acts of Parliament of the old Parliament of Scotland, that was merged with the old Parliament of England to form the Parliament of Great Britain, by the Union with England Act 1707 (c. 7).

For other years, see list of acts of the Parliament of Scotland. For the period after 1707, see list of acts of the Parliament of Great Britain.

== 1515 ==
The 1st parliament of James V, held in Edinburgh from 12 July 1515.

Short title, or popular name	Citation	Royal assent
Long title
Church Act 1515 (repealed)	1515 c. 1 (Note: This is the citation in the Record Edition.); 1515 c. 1 (Note: This is the citation in the Duodecimal Edition.)	12 July 1515
Of halie kirk. Of the holy church. (Repealed by Statute Law Revision (Scotland) Act 1906 (6 Edw. 7. c. 38))
Theft Act 1515 (repealed)	1515 c. 2; 1515 c. 2	12 July 1515
For stanching of the cryme of thift and stouthreif. For stanching the crimes of theft and violent robbery. (Repealed by Statute Law Revision (Scotland) Act 1906 (6 Edw. 7. c. 38))

=== Sources ===
- Alexander, William (1841). "Acta Parliamentorum Regis Jacobi Quinti". An Abridgement of the Acts of the Parliaments of Scotland. Edinburgh: Adam and Charles Black. p. A14 – via Google Books.
- Alexander, William (1841). "Acta Parliamentorum Regis Jacobi Quinti". An Abridgement of the Acts of the Parliaments of Scotland. Edinburgh: Adam and Charles Black. p. A14 – via Google Books.
- Chronological Table of the Statutes. London: Her Majesty's Stationery Office. 1972. p. 1327 – via Google Books.
- "Index of Statutes: James V (1513-1542)". Records of the Parliaments of Scotland to 1707. University of St Andrews.

== See also ==
- List of legislation in the United Kingdom
- Records of the Parliaments of Scotland
