= List of acts of the Parliament of Scotland from 1451 =

This is a list of acts of the Parliament of Scotland for the year 1451.

It lists acts of Parliament of the old Parliament of Scotland, that was merged with the old Parliament of England to form the Parliament of Great Britain, by the Union with England Act 1707 (c. 7).

For other years, see list of acts of the Parliament of Scotland. For the period after 1707, see list of acts of the Parliament of Great Britain.

== 1451 ==
The 8th parliament of James II, held in Sterling on 25 October 1451.

| Short title, or popular name | Citation | Royal assent |
Long title
| Coinage Act 1451 (repealed) | 1451 cc. 1-18 (Note: This is the citation in the Record Edition.); 1451 cc. 33-37 (Note: This is the citation in the Duodecimal Edition.) | 25 October 1451 |
The avisement of the Deputis of the thre Estatis tuiching the mater of the money &c. The advice of the Deputes of the three Estates touching the matter of the money, etc. (Repealed by Statute Law Revision (Scotland) Act 1906 (6 Edw. 7. c. 38))

=== Sources ===
- Alexander, William (1841). "Acta Parliamentorum Regis Jacobi Secundi". An Abridgement of the Acts of the Parliaments of Scotland. Edinburgh: Adam and Charles Black. p. 441 – via Google Books.
- Alexander, William (1841). "Acta Parliamentorum Regis Jacobi Secundi". An Abridgement of the Acts of the Parliaments of Scotland. Edinburgh: Adam and Charles Black. p. 441 – via Google Books.
- Chronological Table of the Statutes. London: Her Majesty's Stationery Office. 1972. p. 1318 – via Google Books.
- "Index of Statutes: James II (1437-1460)". Records of the Parliaments of Scotland to 1707. University of St Andrews.

== See also ==
- List of legislation in the United Kingdom
- Records of the Parliaments of Scotland
