= List of acts of the Parliament of Scotland from 1428 =

This is a list of acts of the Parliament of Scotland for the year 1428.

It lists acts of Parliament of the old Parliament of Scotland, that was merged with the old Parliament of England to form the Parliament of Great Britain, by the Union with England Act 1707 (c. 7).

For other years, see list of acts of the Parliament of Scotland. For the period after 1707, see list of acts of the Parliament of Great Britain.

== 1428 ==
The 8th parliament of James I, held in Perth.

Short title, or popular name	Citation	Royal assent
Long title
Oath by Queen Act 1428 (repealed)	Vol. II, p. 17 (Note: This is the citation in the Record Edition.); 1428 c. 109 (Note: This is the citation in the Duodecimal Edition.)	12 July 1428
De juramento prestando Domine Regine. On taking the oath by the Lady Queen. (Repealed by Statute Law Revision (Scotland) Act 1906 (6 Edw. 7. c. 38))

=== Sources ===
- Alexander, William (1841). "Acta Parliamentorum Regis Jacobi Primi". An Abridgement of the Acts of the Parliaments of Scotland. Edinburgh: Adam and Charles Black. p. 439 – via Google Books.
- Alexander, William (1841). "Acta Parliamentorum Regis Jacobi Primi". An Abridgement of the Acts of the Parliaments of Scotland. Edinburgh: Adam and Charles Black. p. 439 – via Google Books.
- Chronological Table of the Statutes. London: Her Majesty's Stationery Office. 1972. p. 1316 – via Google Books.
- "Index of Statutes: James I (1406-1337)". Records of the Parliaments of Scotland to 1707. University of St Andrews.

== See also ==
- List of legislation in the United Kingdom
- Records of the Parliaments of Scotland
