= List of acts of the Parliament of Scotland from 1493 =

This is a list of acts of the Parliament of Scotland for the year 1493.

It lists acts of Parliament of the old Parliament of Scotland, that was merged with the old Parliament of England to form the Parliament of Great Britain, by the Union with England Act 1707 (c. 7).

For other years, see list of acts of the Parliament of Scotland. For the period after 1707, see list of acts of the Parliament of Great Britain.

== 1493 ==
The 4th parliament of James IV, held in Edinburgh from 8 May 1493.

Short title, or popular name	Citation	Royal assent
Long title
Church Act 1493 (repealed)	1493 c. 1 (Note: This is the citation in the Record Edition.) — (Note: This act is not listed in the Duodecimal Edition.)	26 June 1493
Anent the libertie and fredom of halie kirk. About the liberty and freedom of the holy church. (Repealed by Statute Law Revision (Scotland) Act 1906 (6 Edw. 7. c. 38))
Privileges Granted by Pope Act 1493 (repealed)	1493 c. 2 —	26 June 1493
Anent the privilegeis grantit be papis to our soverane lordis predecessouris. Regarding the privileges granted by the popes to our sovereign lord's predecessors. (Repealed by Statute Law Revision (Scotland) Act 1906 (6 Edw. 7. c. 38))
Benefices Act 1493 (repealed)	1493 c. 3; 1493 c. 38 (Note: This is the citation in the Duodecimal Edition.)	26 June 1493
Anent the beneficis quhilkis passis now to the court of Rome that war of befoir disponit in the realme be electiounis. Regarding the benefices, which now go to the court of Rome, that were previously regulated in the realm by elections. (Repealed by Statute Law Revision (Scotland) Act 1906 (6 Edw. 7. c. 38))
Benefices (No. 2) Act 1493 (repealed)	1493 c. 4 —	26 June 1493
Anent the privilege tuiching the dispositioun and promotioun of all benefices elective. Regarding the privilege touching the disposition and promotion of all elective benefices. (Repealed by Statute Law Revision (Scotland) Act 1906 (6 Edw. 7. c. 38))
Papal Legates Act 1493 (repealed)	1493 c. 5 —	26 June 1493
Anent the privilege That na legat salbe ressavit within the realme bot gif he be ane Cardinall or native born of the realme. Regarding the privilege That no legate shall be received within the realm unless he is a Cardinal or is native born of the realm. (Repealed by Statute Law Revision (Scotland) Act 1906 (6 Edw. 7. c. 38))
St. Andrews and Glasgow Act 1493 (repealed)	1493 c. 6 —	26 June 1493
Indult grantit perpetuallie to the Segis of Sanctandrois and Glasgw to confirme the electiounis of all abbaceis. Indult granted perpetually to the sees of St Andrews and Glasgow, to confirm the elections of all abbacies. (Repealed by Statute Law Revision (Scotland) Act 1906 (6 Edw. 7. c. 38))
St. Andrews and Glasgow (No. 2) Act 1493 (repealed)	1493 c. 7 —	26 June 1493
Anent the pley now dependand in the court of Rome betuix the bischopis of Sanctandrois and Glasgw. Regarding the plea now pending in the court of Rome between the bishops of St Andrews and Glasgow. (Repealed by Statute Law Revision (Scotland) Act 1906 (6 Edw. 7. c. 38))
Pleas in Court of Rome Act 1493 (repealed)	1493 c. 8 —	26 June 1493
Anent all uthirs pleyis in the court of Rome upone causis beneficiall. Regarding all other pleas in the court of Rome upon causes beneficial. (Repealed by Statute Law Revision (Scotland) Act 1906 (6 Edw. 7. c. 38))
Benefices (No. 3) Act 1493 (repealed)	1493 c. 9; 1493 c. 39	26 June 1493
Anent taxationis of benefices eftir the auld Rome taxation contenit in the buke of Bagimontis taxt. Regarding taxation of benefices according to the old Rome taxation contained in the book of Bagimond's tax. (Repealed by Statute Law Revision (Scotland) Act 1906 (6 Edw. 7. c. 38))
Currency Act 1493 (repealed)	1493 c. 10; 1493 c. 40	26 June 1493
Anent the refusing of the money for crakkis and flawis being in it. Regarding refusing money because of the cracks and flaws found in it. (Repealed by Statute Law Revision (Scotland) Act 1906 (6 Edw. 7. c. 38))
Royal Marriage Act 1493 (repealed)	1493 c. 11 —	26 June 1493
Of a commissioun to end and conclude our soverane lordis mariage. Of a commission to end and conclude our sovereign lord's marriage. (Repealed by Statute Law Revision (Scotland) Act 1906 (6 Edw. 7. c. 38))
Customs Act 1493 (repealed)	1493 c. 12; 1493 c. 41	26 June 1493
Anent the defraude done to our soverane lord in his custumis be strangearis. Regarding the defrauding of our sovereign lord's customs by foreigners. (Repealed by Statute Law Revision (Scotland) Act 1906 (6 Edw. 7. c. 38))
Craftsmen Act 1493 (repealed)	1493 c. 13; 1493 c. 42	26 June 1493
Anent the craftismen of burrowis that takis taxatioun penny of men of the samin craft cummand to the merket. Regarding the craftsmen of burghs that take taxation of a penny of men of the same craft coming to the market. (Repealed by Statute Law Revision (Scotland) Act 1906 (6 Edw. 7. c. 38))
Deacons of Craft Act 1493 (repealed)	1493 c. 14; 1493 c. 43	26 June 1493
Anent the using of dekynnis of men of craft in burrowis And als anent men of craft that statutis to have fee for the haly day. Regarding the use of deacons of craft in burghs, And also regarding craftsmen who decree that they shall have fees for holy days. (Repealed by Statute Law Revision (Scotland) Act 1906 (6 Edw. 7. c. 38))
Multures Act 1493 (repealed)	1493 c. 15; 1493 c. 44	26 June 1493
Anent the taking of multur of the floure that cumis furth of uther landis to burrowis. Regarding the taking of multure of the flour that comes forth of other lands to burghs. (Repealed by Statute Law Revision (Scotland) Act 1906 (6 Edw. 7. c. 38))
Execution of Statutes Act 1493 (repealed)	1493 c. 16; 1493 c. 45	26 June 1493
Of the execucioun of all statutis quhilkis hes in the end of thame the pane of dittay. Of the execution of all statutes which have in the end the pain of indictment. (Repealed by Statute Law Revision (Scotland) Act 1906 (6 Edw. 7. c. 38))
Taxation Act 1493 (repealed)	1493 c. 17; 1493 cc. 46-4	26 June 1493
Of the taxatiounis to be takin be custumaris within burgh. Of the taxations to be taken by customs men within burghs. (Repealed by Statute Law Revision (Scotland) Act 1906 (6 Edw. 7. c. 38))
Muirburn Act 1493 (repealed)	1493 c. 18; 1493 c. 48	26 June 1493
Anent settaris of mureburn. About setters of muir-burning. (Repealed by Statute Law Revision (Scotland) Act 1906 (6 Edw. 7. c. 38))
Herons Act 1493 (repealed)	1493 c. 19 —	26 June 1493
Anent the distroying of heron sewis. About the destroying of herons' young. (Repealed by Statute Law Revision (Scotland) Act 1906 (6 Edw. 7. c. 38))
Seafishing Act 1493 (repealed)	1493 c. 20; 1493 c. 49	26 June 1493
Anent schippis and buschis for fischeing. Regarding ships and busses for fishing. (Repealed by Statute Law Revision (Scotland) Act 1906 (6 Edw. 7. c. 38))
Donations by Late King Act 1493 (repealed)	1493 c. 21; 1493 c. 50	26 June 1493
Of donatiounis and infeftmentis maid be oure soverane lord that last decessit. Of donations and infeftments made by our sovereign lord the last, deceased. (Repealed by Statute Law Revision (Scotland) Act 1906 (6 Edw. 7. c. 38))
King's Revocation Act 1493 (repealed)	1493 c. 22; 1493 c. 51	26 June 1493
The kingis Revocatioun of alienatiounis donatiounis &c. The king's Revocation of alienations, donations, etc. (Repealed by Statute Law Revision (Scotland) Act 1906 (6 Edw. 7. c. 38))
Salmon Barrels Act 1493 (repealed)	1493 c. 23; 1493 c. 52	26 June 1493
Anent the barrelling of Salmond of the auld bind of Abirdene. Regarding the barrelling of Salmon of the old Aberdeen measurement. (Repealed by Statute Law Revision (Scotland) Act 1906 (6 Edw. 7. c. 38))
Sea-fishing Act 1493 (repealed)	1493 c. 24; 1493 c. 52	26 June 1493
Anent the schippis and making of fische at the west coist. Regarding ships and fishing at the west coast. (Repealed by Statute Law Revision (Scotland) Act 1906 (6 Edw. 7. c. 38))

=== Sources ===
- Alexander, William (1841). "Acta Parliamentorum Regis Jacobi Quarti". An Abridgement of the Acts of the Parliaments of Scotland. Edinburgh: Adam and Charles Black. p. 448 – via Google Books.
- Alexander, William (1841). "Acta Parliamentorum Regis Jacobi Quarti". An Abridgement of the Acts of the Parliaments of Scotland. Edinburgh: Adam and Charles Black. p. 448 – via Google Books.
- Chronological Table of the Statutes. London: Her Majesty's Stationery Office. 1972. p. 1326 – via Google Books.
- "Index of Statutes: James IV (1488-1513)". Records of the Parliaments of Scotland to 1707. University of St Andrews.

== See also ==
- List of legislation in the United Kingdom
- Records of the Parliaments of Scotland
