= List of acts of the Parliament of Scotland from 1437 =

This is a list of acts of the Parliament of Scotland for the year 1437.

It lists acts of Parliament of the old Parliament of Scotland, that was merged with the old Parliament of England to form the Parliament of Great Britain, by the Union with England Act 1707 (c. 7).

For other years, see list of acts of the Parliament of Scotland. For the period after 1707, see list of acts of the Parliament of Great Britain.

== 1437 ==
The 1st Parliament of James II.

Short title, or popular name	Citation	Royal assent
Long title
Coronation Act 1437 (repealed)	Vol. II, p. 31 (Note: This is the citation in the Record Edition.); 1437 c. 1 (Note: This is the citation in the Duodecimal Edition.)	25 March 1437
Of the Coronation of our Soveraine Lord. Of the Coronation of our Sovereign Lord. (Repealed by Statute Law Revision (Scotland) Act 1906 (6 Edw. 7. c. 38))
Crown Lands Act 1437 (repealed)	Vol. II, p. 31 (undated); 1437 c. 2	
Revocation of landes, possessiones, and moveable gudes—Alienation of the Kingis Landes. Revocation of the lands, possessions, and moveable goods: Alienation of the King's Lands. (Repealed by Statute Law Revision (Scotland) Act 1906 (6 Edw. 7. c. 38))

=== Sources ===
- Chronological Table of the Statutes. London: Her Majesty's Stationery Office. 1972. p. 1317 – via Google Books.
- "Index of Statutes: James II (1437-1460)". Records of the Parliaments of Scotland to 1707. University of St Andrews.

== See also ==
- List of legislation in the United Kingdom
- Records of the Parliaments of Scotland
