= List of acts of the Parliament of Scotland from 1433 =

This is a list of acts of the Parliament of Scotland for the year 1433.

It lists acts of Parliament of the old Parliament of Scotland, that was merged with the old Parliament of England to form the Parliament of Great Britain, by the Union with England Act 1707 (c. 7).

For other years, see list of acts of the Parliament of Scotland. For the period after 1707, see list of acts of the Parliament of Great Britain.

== 1433 ==
The 11th parliament of James I, held in Sterling on 1 March 1434.

Short title, or popular name	Citation	Royal assent
Long title
King's Protection Act 1433 (repealed)	1433 c. 1 (Note: This is the citation in the Record Edition.); 1433 c. 134 (Note: This is the citation in the Duodecimal Edition.)	1 March 1434
Of the act maid at Perth anentis the breif of the breking of the kingis proteccioun. Of the act made at Perth about the brieve of the breaking of the King's protection. (Repealed by Statute Law Revision (Scotland) Act 1906 (6 Edw. 7. c. 38))
Mill Lades Act 1433 (repealed)	1433 c. 2 — (Note: This act is not listed in the Duodecimal Edition.)	1 March 1434
Of the breif of watter gangis. Of the brieve of water courses. (Repealed by Statute Law Revision (Scotland) Act 1906 (6 Edw. 7. c. 38))
Defaulting Sheriffs Act 1433 (repealed)	1433 c. 3 —	1 March 1434
De vicecomitibus qui non debite execucionem actorum parliamenti. Of the sheriffs who should not execute the acts of parliament. (Repealed by Statute Law Revision (Scotland) Act 1906 (6 Edw. 7. c. 38))

=== Sources ===
- Alexander, William (1841). "Acta Parliamentorum Regis Jacobi Primi". An Abridgement of the Acts of the Parliaments of Scotland. Edinburgh: Adam and Charles Black. p. 440 – via Google Books.
- Alexander, William (1841). "Acta Parliamentorum Regis Jacobi Primi". An Abridgement of the Acts of the Parliaments of Scotland. Edinburgh: Adam and Charles Black. p. 440 – via Google Books.
- Chronological Table of the Statutes. London: Her Majesty's Stationery Office. 1972. p. 1317 – via Google Books.
- "Index of Statutes: James I (1406-1337)". Records of the Parliaments of Scotland to 1707. University of St Andrews.

== See also ==
- List of legislation in the United Kingdom
- Records of the Parliaments of Scotland
