= List of acts of the Parliament of Scotland from 1528 =

This is a list of acts of the Parliament of Scotland for the year 1528.

It lists acts of Parliament of the old Parliament of Scotland, that was merged with the old Parliament of England to form the Parliament of Great Britain, by the Union with England Act 1707 (c. 7).

For other years, see list of acts of the Parliament of Scotland. For the period after 1707, see list of acts of the Parliament of Great Britain.

== 1528 ==
Continuing the 3rd parliament of James V, held in Edinburgh from 2 September 1528.

Short title, or popular name	Citation	Royal assent
Long title
Coroner's Arrestments Act 1528 (repealed)	1528 c. 1 (Note: This is the citation in the Record Edition.); 1528 c. 5 (Note: This is the citation in the Duodecimal Edition.)	22 January 1529
Anent the making of arrestmentis be crowneris. Regarding the making of arrestments by coroners. (Repealed by Statute Law Revision (Scotland) Act 1906 (6 Edw. 7. c. 38))
Responsibility for Tenants Act 1528 (repealed)	1528 c. 2; 1528 c. 6	22 January 1529
Barounis and frehaldaris to ansuer in Justice aris for the men duelland upon thair awine landis. Barons and freeholders to answer in Justice ayres for the men duelling upon their own lands. (Repealed by Statute Law Revision (Scotland) Act 1906 (6 Edw. 7. c. 38))
Assythment Act 1528 (repealed)	1528 c. 3; 1528 c. 7	22 January 1529
Anent actiounis for assithement. Regarding actions for assythment. (Repealed by Statute Law Revision (Scotland) Act 1906 (6 Edw. 7. c. 38))

=== Sources ===
- Alexander, William (1841). "Acta Parliamentorum Regis Jacobi Quinti". An Abridgement of the Acts of the Parliaments of Scotland. Edinburgh: Adam and Charles Black. p. A15 – via Google Books.
- Alexander, William (1841). "Acta Parliamentorum Regis Jacobi Quinti". An Abridgement of the Acts of the Parliaments of Scotland. Edinburgh: Adam and Charles Black. p. A15 – via Google Books.
- Chronological Table of the Statutes. London: Her Majesty's Stationery Office. 1972. p. 1328 – via Google Books.
- "Index of Statutes: James V (1513-1542)". Records of the Parliaments of Scotland to 1707. University of St Andrews.

== See also ==
- List of legislation in the United Kingdom
- Records of the Parliaments of Scotland
