= List of acts of the Parliament of Scotland from 1532 =

This is a list of acts of the Parliament of Scotland for the year 1532.

It lists acts of Parliament of the old Parliament of Scotland, that was merged with the old Parliament of England to form the Parliament of Great Britain, by the Union with England Act 1707 (c. 7).

For other years, see list of acts of the Parliament of Scotland. For the period after 1707, see list of acts of the Parliament of Great Britain.

== 1532 ==
The 5th parliament of James V.

Short title, or popular name	Citation	Royal assent
Long title
Church Act 1532 (repealed)	1532 c. 1 (Note: This is the citation in the Record Edition.) — (Note: This act is not listed in the Duodecimal Edition.)	17 May 1532
Of the auctorite liberte and fredome of the sete of Rome and halikirk. Of the authority, liberty and freedom of the See of Rome and the holy church. (Repealed by Statute Law Revision (Scotland) Act 1906 (6 Edw. 7. c. 38))
College of Justice Act 1532 still in force	1532 c. 2; 1537 cc. 36–41 (Note: This is the citation in the Duodecimal Edition.)	17 May 1532
Concerning the ordour of Justice and the institutioun of ane college of cunning and wise men for the administracioun of Justice. Concerning the order of Justice, and the institution of a college of cunning and wise men for the administration of Justice.
Money Act 1532 (repealed)	1532 c. 3 —	17 May 1532
Anent the keping of money within the realme. About the keeping of money within the realm. (Repealed by Statute Law Revision (Scotland) Act 1906 (6 Edw. 7. c. 38))
Not public and general	1532 c. 4 —	17 May 1532
Restoratioun of Alexander Drummond sumtyme of Carnok. Restoration of Alexander Drummond, sometime of Carnock.

=== Sources ===
- Alexander, William (1841). "Acta Parliamentorum Regis Jacobi Quinti". An Abridgement of the Acts of the Parliaments of Scotland. Edinburgh: Adam and Charles Black. p. A15 – via Google Books.
- Alexander, William (1841). "Acta Parliamentorum Regis Jacobi Quinti". An Abridgement of the Acts of the Parliaments of Scotland. Edinburgh: Adam and Charles Black. p. A15 – via Google Books.
- Chronological Table of the Statutes. London: Her Majesty's Stationery Office. 1972. pp. 1328–1329 – via Google Books.
- "Acts of the Old Scottish Parliament: 1532". legislation.gov.uk. The National Archives.
- "Index of Statutes: James V (1513-1542)". Records of the Parliaments of Scotland to 1707. University of St Andrews.

== See also ==
- List of legislation in the United Kingdom
- Records of the Parliaments of Scotland
