= List of acts of the Parliament of Scotland from 1571 =

This is a list of acts of the Parliament of Scotland for the years 1571 to 1579.

It lists acts of Parliament of the old Parliament of Scotland, that was merged with the old Parliament of England to form the Parliament of Great Britain, by the Union with England Act 1707 (c. 7).

For other years, see list of acts of the Parliament of Scotland. For the period after 1707, see list of acts of the Parliament of Great Britain.

== 1571 ==
The 2nd parliament of James VI.

Short title, or popular name	Citation	Royal assent
Long title
Regent Act 1571 (repealed)	1571 c. 1 (Note: This is the citation in the Record Edition.); 1571 c. 34 (Note: This is the citation in the Duodecimal Edition.)	28 August 1571
Anent the nominatioun electioun acceptatioun and approbatioun of my lord of Mar in regent. (Repealed by repealed by Statute Law Revision (Scotland) Act 1906 (6 Edw. 7. c. 38))
Church Act 1571 (repealed)	1571 c. 2; 1571 c. 35	28 August 1571
Ratificatioun and approbatioun of the actis and statutis maid of befor anent the fredome and libertie of the trew kirk of God. (Repealed by Statute Law Revision (Scotland) Act 1906 (6 Edw. 7. c. 38))
Ratification of Previous Parliament Act 1571 (repealed)	1571 c. 3 — (Note: This act is not listed in the Duodecimal Edition.)	28 August 1571
Ratificatioun of the domes decretis and utheris led and pronuncit in the last parliament haldin at Edinburgh in Maii last bipast. (Repealed by Statute Law Revision (Scotland) Act 1906 (6 Edw. 7. c. 38))
Darnley's Murderers Act 1571 (repealed)	1571 c. 4; 1571 c. 36	28 August 1571
Anent alienationis resignationis and utheris maid or to be maid be ony personis convict or that sal happin to be convict of the slauchteris of our Soverane lordis fader or regentis. (Repealed by Statute Law Revision (Scotland) Act 1906 (6 Edw. 7. c. 38))
Forfeited Persons Act 1571 (repealed)	1571 c. 5; 1571 c. 37	28 August 1571
Anent the vassallis and fre tenentis of sic as ar forfaltit in this parliament. (Repealed by Statute Law Revision (Scotland) Act 1906 (6 Edw. 7. c. 38))
Not public and general	1571 c. 6; 1571 c. 38	28 August 1571
Anent landis rowmes and possessionis haldin of freris or nunnis within this realme.
Burghs Act 1571 (repealed)	1571 c. 7 —	28 August 1571
Anent the fredome and previlegeis of burrowis. (Repealed by Statute Law Revision (Scotland) Act 1906 (6 Edw. 7. c. 38))
Alienations by Rebel Burgesses Act 1571 (repealed)	1571 c. 8; 1571 c. 39	28 August 1571
Anent alienationis resignationis and utheris dispositionis maid and gevin be ony personis burgessis and inhabitantis of Edinburgh or ony utheris burrowis within this realme that hes maid defectioun fra the kingis auctoritie. (Repealed by Statute Law Revision (Scotland) Act 1906 (6 Edw. 7. c. 38))
Shipping Act 1571 (repealed)	1571 c. 9; 1571 c. 40	28 August 1571
That na schippis saill without our Soverane lordis coquet. (Repealed by Statute Law Revision (Scotland) Act 1906 (6 Edw. 7. c. 38))
Officers at Arms Act 1571 (repealed)	1571 c. 10 —	28 August 1571
Anent herauldis masaris pursevantis and utheris officiaris that servit aganis our Soverane lord and his auctoritie. (Repealed by Statute Law Revision (Scotland) Act 1906 (6 Edw. 7. c. 38))
Not public and general	1571 c. 11 —	28 August 1571
Discharge to my lord Lindesay of the money send fra France be Johnne Chesholme.
Not public and general	1571 c. 12 —	28 August 1571
Act in favouris of the nobilitie and utheris quhilkis adjonit and accompaneit the army of England aganis rebellis to the kingis majestie.
Not public and general	1571 c. 13 —	28 August 1571
Act in favouris of James erle of Mortoun Patrik lord Lindesay and utheris for their resistance to the kingis declarit tratouris.
Not public and general	1571 c. 14 —	28 August 1571
Act in favouris of Johnne Cunnynghame of Drumquhassill and utheris takaris of the castell of Dunbartane.
Chapel Royal of Stirling Act 1571 (repealed)	1571 c. 15 —	28 August 1571
Anent the reformatioun of the chapel riall of Striveling. (Repealed by Statute Law Revision (Scotland) Act 1906 (6 Edw. 7. c. 38))
Not public and general	1571 c. 16 —	28 August 1571
Act in favour of Johnne lord Glammis anent the keiping of the hous of Kynnard.
Not public and general	1571 c. 17 —	28 August 1571
Anent the eschetis of the personis cumin to the kingis obedience.
Churchmen Slain in Service Act 1571 (repealed)	1571 c. 18; 1571 c. 41	28 August 1571
Anent kirkmen that happinis to be slane in our soverane lordis service. (Repealed by Statute Law Revision (Scotland) Act 1906 (6 Edw. 7. c. 38))
Men Slain in Service Act 1571 (repealed)	1571 c. 19; 1571 c. 42	28 August 1571
In defence of his hienes auctorite Anent the ward releif and meriage of thame that salhappin to be slane in our Soverane lordis service In defence of his Majesteis auctorite. (Repealed by Statute Law Revision (Scotland) Act 1906 (6 Edw. 7. c. 38))
Men Slain in Service (No. 2) Act 1571 (repealed)	1571 c. 20; 1571 c. 43	28 August 1571
Anent possessiounis. (Repealed by Statute Law Revision (Scotland) Act 1906 (6 Edw. 7. c. 38))
Treaty with England Act 1571 (repealed)	1571 c. 21 —	28 August 1571
Anent a commissioun for treating with the quenis majestie of Ingland. (Repealed by Statute Law Revision (Scotland) Act 1906 (6 Edw. 7. c. 38))

=== Sources ===
- Alexander, William (1841). "Acta Parliamentorum Regis Jacobi Sexti". An Abridgement of the Acts of the Parliaments of Scotland. Edinburgh: Adam and Charles Black. p. A22 – via Google Books.
- Alexander, William (1841). "Acta Parliamentorum Regis Jacobi Sexti". An Abridgement of the Acts of the Parliaments of Scotland. Edinburgh: Adam and Charles Black. p. A22 – via Google Books.
- Chronological Table of the Statutes. London: Her Majesty's Stationery Office. 1972. p. 1335 – via Google Books.
- "Index of Statutes: James VI (1567-1625)". Records of the Parliaments of Scotland to 1707. University of St Andrews.

== See also ==
- List of legislation in the United Kingdom
- Records of the Parliaments of Scotland
