= List of acts of the Parliament of Scotland from 1482 =

This is a list of acts of the Parliament of Scotland for the years 1481 to 1489.

It lists acts of Parliament of the old Parliament of Scotland, that was merged with the old Parliament of England to form the Parliament of Great Britain, by the Union with England Act 1707 (c. 7).

For other years, see list of acts of the Parliament of Scotland. For the period after 1707, see list of acts of the Parliament of Great Britain.

== 1482 ==
The 12th parliament of James III.

Short title, or popular name	Citation	Royal assent
Long title
Peace with England Act 1482 (repealed)	1482 c. 1 (Note: This is the citation in the Record Edition.) — (Note: This act is not listed in the Duodecimal Edition.)	11 December 1482
Of pece and aliance with Ingland. Of peace and alliance with England. (Repealed by Statute Law Revision (Scotland) Act 1906 (6 Edw. 7. c. 38))
Lieutenant-General Act 1482 (repealed)	1482 c. 2 —	11 December 1482
Anent the duke of Albany (Note: Alexander Stewart, Duke of Albany.)—to tak apon him to be lieutennent generale of the realme. Regardind the duke of Albany: to take upon him to be ieutenant general of the realm. (Repealed by Statute Law Revision (Scotland) Act 1906 (6 Edw. 7. c. 38))
Defence of the Realm Act 1482 (repealed)	1482 c. 3 —	11 December 1482
For the defence of the realme baith be sey and land. For the defence of the realm both by sea and land. (Repealed by Statute Law Revision (Scotland) Act 1906 (6 Edw. 7. c. 38))
Administration of Justice Act 1482 (repealed)	1482 c. 4 —	11 December 1482
Of the ministracione of Justice be wardanis schireffs and uthir officiaris. Of the administration of Justice by wardens, sheriffs, and other officials. (Repealed by Statute Law Revision (Scotland) Act 1906 (6 Edw. 7. c. 38))
Warden's Courts Act 1482 (repealed)	1482 c. 5; 1482 c. 86 (Note: This is the citation in the Duodecimal Edition.)	11 December 1482
Of the continuacioun of wardanis courtis. Of the continuation of the warden's courts. (Repealed by Statute Law Revision (Scotland) Act 1906 (6 Edw. 7. c. 38))
Safe Conducts Act 1482 (repealed)	1482 c. 6; 1482 c. 87	11 December 1482
Aganis thame that breikis sauf conduct. Against those that break safe conduct. (Repealed by Statute Law Revision (Scotland) Act 1906 (6 Edw. 7. c. 38))
Wine Act 1482 (repealed)	1482 c. 7; 1482 c. 88	11 December 1482
Aganis the inbringing of corrupt or mixt wyne within the Realme. Against the importation of corrupt or blended wine within the realm. (Repealed by Statute Law Revision (Scotland) Act 1906 (6 Edw. 7. c. 38))
Money Act 1482 (repealed)	1482 c. 8 —	11 December 1482
Anent the halding of money within the realme. Regarding the retaining of money within the realm. (Repealed by Statute Law Revision (Scotland) Act 1906 (6 Edw. 7. c. 38))
Benefices Act 1482 (repealed)	1482 c. 9 —	11 December 1482
Anent the purchesing of pensions furth of beneficis. Regarding the purchasing of pensions from benefices. (Repealed by Statute Law Revision (Scotland) Act 1906 (6 Edw. 7. c. 38))
Foreign Trade Act 1482 (repealed)	1482 c. 10; 1482 1487 c. 114	11 December 1482
For the inbringing of victalis and nedefull merchandise be strangearis of uthir realmes. For the importation of victuals and required merchandise by foreigners of other realms. (Repealed by Statute Law Revision (Scotland) Act 1906 (6 Edw. 7. c. 38))
Scots Traders in France Act 1482 (repealed)	1482 c. 11 —	11 December 1482
For remede of the complaynt made be divers merchandis that thair gudis are haldin fra them in France. For the remedy of the comaplint made by diverse merchants that their goods are kept from them in France. (Repealed by Statute Law Revision (Scotland) Act 1906 (6 Edw. 7. c. 38))

=== Sources ===
- Alexander, William (1841). "Acta Parliamentorum Regis Jacobi Tertii". An Abridgement of the Acts of the Parliaments of Scotland. Edinburgh: Adam and Charles Black. p. 445 – via Google Books.
- Alexander, William (1841). "Acta Parliamentorum Regis Jacobi Tertii". An Abridgement of the Acts of the Parliaments of Scotland. Edinburgh: Adam and Charles Black. p. 445 – via Google Books.
- Chronological Table of the Statutes. London: Her Majesty's Stationery Office. 1972. p. 1323 – via Google Books.
- "Index of Statutes: James III (1460-1488)". Records of the Parliaments of Scotland to 1707. University of St Andrews.

== See also ==
- List of legislation in the United Kingdom
- Records of the Parliaments of Scotland
