= List of acts of the Parliament of Scotland from 1558 =

This is a list of acts of the Parliament of Scotland for the year 1558.

It lists acts of Parliament of the old Parliament of Scotland, that was merged with the old Parliament of England to form the Parliament of Great Britain, by the Union with England Act 1707 (c. 7).

For other years, see list of acts of the Parliament of Scotland. For the period after 1707, see list of acts of the Parliament of Great Britain.

== 1558 ==
The 8th parliament of Mary.

Short title, or popular name	Citation	Royal assent
Long title
Commissioners to France Act 1558 (repealed)	1558 c. 1 (Note: This is the citation in the Record Edition.) — (Note: This act is not listed in the Duodecimal Edition.)	29 November 1558
Approbation exoneratioun and discharge of the commissionaris to oure soverane lady anentis hir mariage with the Dolphine of France. (Repealed by Statute Law Revision (Scotland) Act 1906 (6 Edw. 7. c. 38))
Commissioners to France (No. 2) Act 1558 (repealed)	1558 c. 2 —	29 November 1558
Exoneratioun and discharge of the saidis commissionaris of thair offices tuiching certane articlis concerning James duke of Chattellarault. (Repealed by Statute Law Revision (Scotland) Act 1906 (6 Edw. 7. c. 38))
Queen's Marriage Act 1558 (repealed)	1558 c. 3 —	29 November 1558
Consent of the estatis that hir hienes may honour hir spous the king Dolphine with the crowne matrimoniale. (Repealed by Statute Law Revision (Scotland) Act 1906 (6 Edw. 7. c. 38))
Queen's Marriage (No. 2) Act 1558 (repealed)	1558 c. 4 —	29 November 1558
Of the maner and forme of all letteris quhatsumevir that sall pas the seilis during the tyme of the mariage betuix the king and the quene Dolphine. (Repealed by Statute Law Revision (Scotland) Act 1906 (6 Edw. 7. c. 38))
Queen's Marriage (No. 3) Act 1558 (repealed)	1558 c. 5 —	29 November 1558
Of the maner and forme of the commissioun to be maid tuiching the crowne matrimoniale. (Repealed by Statute Law Revision (Scotland) Act 1906 (6 Edw. 7. c. 38))
French Subjects Act 1558 (repealed)	1558 c. 6; 1558 c. 65 (Note: This is the citation in the Duodecimal Edition.)	29 November 1558
Anent ane letter of naturalitie to the maist Cristin king of France subjectis being or sal happin to be in the realme of Scotland. (Repealed by Statute Law Revision (Scotland) Act 1906 (6 Edw. 7. c. 38))
Grants by Queen Regent Act 1558 (repealed)	1558 c. 7 —	29 November 1558
Anent the expeding of letteris of gift and utheris letteris. (Repealed by Statute Law Revision (Scotland) Act 1906 (6 Edw. 7. c. 38))

=== Sources ===
- Alexander, William (1841). "Acta Parliamentorum Mariæ Reginæ". An Abridgement of the Acts of the Parliaments of Scotland. Edinburgh: Adam and Charles Black. p. A19 – via Google Books.
- Alexander, William (1841). "Acta Parliamentorum Mariæ Reginæ". An Abridgement of the Acts of the Parliaments of Scotland. Edinburgh: Adam and Charles Black. p. A19 – via Google Books.
- Chronological Table of the Statutes. London: Her Majesty's Stationery Office. 1972. p. 1333 – via Google Books.
- "Index of Statutes: Mary I (1542-1567)". Records of the Parliaments of Scotland to 1707. University of St Andrews.

== See also ==
- List of legislation in the United Kingdom
- Records of the Parliaments of Scotland
