= List of acts of the Parliament of Scotland from 1456 =

This is a list of acts of the Parliament of Scotland for the year 1456.

It lists acts of Parliament of the old Parliament of Scotland, that was merged with the old Parliament of England to form the Parliament of Great Britain, by the Union with England Act 1707 (c. 7).

For other years, see list of acts of the Parliament of Scotland. For the period after 1707, see list of acts of the Parliament of Great Britain.

== 1456 ==
The 13th parliament of James II.

Short title, or popular name	Citation	Royal assent
Long title
Taking Prisoners Act 1456 (repealed)	1456 c. 1 (Note: This is the citation in the Record Edition.) — (Note: This act is not listed in the Duodecimal Edition.)	19 October 1456
Anent debatis of the taking of presonaris. Regarding debates of the taking of prisoners. (Repealed by Statute Law Revision (Scotland) Act 1906 (6 Edw. 7. c. 38))
Borders Act 1456 (repealed)	1456 c. 2 —	19 October 1456
Of the supple of the bordouris. Of the supply of the borders. (Repealed by Statute Law Revision (Scotland) Act 1906 (6 Edw. 7. c. 38))
Defence of Realm Act 1456 (repealed)	1456 c. 3; 1456 c. 56 (Note: This is the citation in the Duodecimal Edition.)	19 October 1456
Of the defence of the realme. Of the defence of the realm. (Repealed by Statute Law Revision (Scotland) Act 1906 (6 Edw. 7. c. 38))
Artillery Act 1456 (repealed)	1456 c. 4 —	19 October 1456
Of cartis of weir. Of carts of war. (Repealed by Statute Law Revision (Scotland) Act 1906 (6 Edw. 7. c. 38))
France Act 1456 (repealed)	1456 c. 5 —	19 October 1456
Of the sending to France. Of exporting to France. (Repealed by Statute Law Revision (Scotland) Act 1906 (6 Edw. 7. c. 38))
Pestilence Act 1456 (repealed)	1456 c. 6; 1456 c. 57	19 October 1456
Of the pestilence and governance thairof. Of pestilence and the governance thereof. (Repealed by Statute Law Revision (Scotland) Act 1906 (6 Edw. 7. c. 38))
Coinage Act 1456 (repealed)	1456 c. 7; 1456 c. 58	19 October 1456
Of the mone. Of the money. (Repealed by Statute Law Revision (Scotland) Act 1906 (6 Edw. 7. c. 38))
Sittings of Justices Act 1456 (repealed)	1456 c. 8 —	19 October 1456
Of Justice and of sessionis halding. Of Justice and the holding of sessions. (Repealed by Statute Law Revision (Scotland) Act 1906 (6 Edw. 7. c. 38))
Sheriffs Act 1456 (repealed)	1456 c. 9; 1456 c. 59	19 October 1456
Of distressis takin be schireffis and constablis at faris. Of distress to be taken by sheriffs and constables at fairs. (Repealed by Statute Law Revision (Scotland) Act 1906 (6 Edw. 7. c. 38))
Constables' Fees Act 1456 (repealed)	1456 c. 10; 1456 c. 60	19 October 1456
Of distressis for constabill feis. Of distress for constables' fees. (Repealed by Statute Law Revision (Scotland) Act 1906 (6 Edw. 7. c. 38))
War with England Act 1456 (repealed)	1456 c. 11 —	19 October 1456
Of vittalys passande to Berwik Roxburghe and Inglande. Of supplies passing to Berwick, Roxburgh and England. (Repealed by Statute Law Revision (Scotland) Act 1906 (6 Edw. 7. c. 38))

=== Sources ===
- Alexander, William (1841). "Acta Parliamentorum Regis Jacobi Secundi". An Abridgement of the Acts of the Parliaments of Scotland. Edinburgh: Adam and Charles Black. p. 441 – via Google Books.
- Alexander, William (1841). "Acta Parliamentorum Regis Jacobi Secundi". An Abridgement of the Acts of the Parliaments of Scotland. Edinburgh: Adam and Charles Black. p. 441 – via Google Books.
- Chronological Table of the Statutes. London: Her Majesty's Stationery Office. 1972. p. 1319 – via Google Books.
- "Index of Statutes: James II (1437-1460)". Records of the Parliaments of Scotland to 1707. University of St Andrews.

== See also ==
- List of legislation in the United Kingdom
- Records of the Parliaments of Scotland
