= List of acts of the Parliament of Scotland from 1509 =

This is a list of acts of the Parliament of Scotland for the year 1509.

It lists acts of Parliament of the old Parliament of Scotland, that was merged with the old Parliament of England to form the Parliament of Great Britain, by the Union with England Act 1707 (c. 7).

For other years, see list of acts of the Parliament of Scotland. For the period after 1707, see list of acts of the Parliament of Great Britain.

== 1509 ==
The 7th parliament of James IV, held in Edinburgh from 8 May 1509.

| Short title, or popular name | Citation | Royal assent |
Long title
| Church Act 1509 (repealed) | 1509 c. 1 (Note: This is the citation in the Record Edition.) — (Note: This act is not listed in the Duodecimal Edition.) | 8 May 1509 |
Of the fredomes of halie kirk. Of the freedoms of the holy church. (Repealed by Statute Law Revision (Scotland) Act 1906 (6 Edw. 7. c. 38))
| Sheriffdoms Act 1509 (repealed) | 1509 c. 2; 1509 c. 101 (Note: This is the citation in the Duodecimal Edition.) | 8 May 1509 |
Anent the Divisioun of schirefdomes. About the division of sheriffdoms. (Repealed by Statute Law Revision (Scotland) Act 1906 (6 Edw. 7. c. 38))

=== Sources ===
- Alexander, William (1841). "Acta Parliamentorum Regis Jacobi Quarti". An Abridgement of the Acts of the Parliaments of Scotland. Edinburgh: Adam and Charles Black. p. A14 – via Google Books.
- Alexander, William (1841). "Acta Parliamentorum Regis Jacobi Quarti". An Abridgement of the Acts of the Parliaments of Scotland. Edinburgh: Adam and Charles Black. p. A14 – via Google Books.
- Chronological Table of the Statutes. London: Her Majesty's Stationery Office. 1972. p. 1327 – via Google Books.
- "Index of Statutes: James IV (1488-1513)". Records of the Parliaments of Scotland to 1707. University of St Andrews.

== See also ==
- List of legislation in the United Kingdom
- Records of the Parliaments of Scotland
