= List of acts of the Parliament of Scotland from 1702 =

This is a list of acts of the Parliament of Scotland for the year 1702.

It lists acts of Parliament of the old Parliament of Scotland, that was merged with the old Parliament of England to form the Parliament of Great Britain, by the Union with England Act 1707 (c. 7).

For other years, see list of acts of the Parliament of Scotland. For the period after 1707, see list of acts of the Parliament of Great Britain.

== 1702 ==
The 10th session of the parliament of William II, held in Edinburgh, after the accession of Queen Anne, from 9 June until 18 August 1702.

Short title, or popular name	Citation	Royal assent
Long title
Queen's Authority Act 1702 (repealed)	1702 c. 1 (Note: This is the citation in the Record Edition.); 1702 c. 1 (Note: This is the citation in the Duodecimal Edition.)	12 June 1702
Act recognizeing her Majesties Royall Authority. (Repealed by Statute Law Revision (Scotland) Act 1906 (6 Edw. 7. c. 38))
Adjournment of Session Act 1702 (repealed)	1702 c. 2; 1702 c. 2	12 June 1702
Act Adjourning the Session till the first of July next. (Repealed by Statute Law Revision (Scotland) Act 1906 (6 Edw. 7. c. 38))
Act of Security 1702 (repealed)	1702 c. 3; 1702 c. 3	12 June 1702
Act for Secureing the true Protestant Religion and Presbyterian Government. (Repealed by Statute Law Revision (Scotland) Act 1906 (6 Edw. 7. c. 38))
Declaration as to Present Meeting Act 1702 (repealed)	1702 c. 4; 1702 c. 4	12 June 1702
Act Declaring the present meeting of Parliament to be a lawfull and free meeting of Parliament. (Repealed by Statute Law Revision (Scotland) Act 1906 (6 Edw. 7. c. 38))
Fast Act 1702 (repealed)	1702 c. 5; 1702 c. 5	12 June 1702
Act for National Fast. (Repealed by Statute Law Revision (Scotland) Act 1906 (6 Edw. 7. c. 38))
Supply Act 1702 (repealed)	1702 c. 6; 1702 c. 6	19 June 1702
Act anent the Supply of Ten Months and a halfs Cess upon the Land Rent. (Repealed by Statute Law Revision (Scotland) Act 1906 (6 Edw. 7. c. 38))
Treaty with England Act 1702 (repealed)	1702 c. 7; 1702 c. 7	23 June 1702
Act enabling her Majesty to appoint Commissioners to treat for an Union betwixt the two Kingdoms of Scotland and England. (Repealed by Statute Law Revision (Scotland) Act 1906 (6 Edw. 7. c. 38))
Justiciary Act 1702 (repealed)	1702 c. 8; 1702 c. 8	23 June 1702
Act for the Justiciary in the Highlands. (Repealed by Statute Law Revision (Scotland) Act 1906 (6 Edw. 7. c. 38))
Adjournment Act 1702 (repealed)	Vol. XI, p. 28; 1702 c. 9	23 June 1702
Act of Adjournment. (Repealed by Statute Law Revision (Scotland) Act 1906 (6 Edw. 7. c. 38))

=== Sources ===
- Alexander, William (1841). "Acta Parliamentorum Annæ". An Abridgement of the Acts of the Parliaments of Scotland. Edinburgh: Adam and Charles Black. p. 521 – via Google Books.
- Alexander, William (1841). "Acta Parliamentorum Annæ". An Abridgement of the Acts of the Parliaments of Scotland. Edinburgh: Adam and Charles Black. p. 521 – via Google Books.
- Chronological Table of the Statutes. London: Her Majesty's Stationery Office. 1972. p. 1367 – via Google Books.
- "Index of Statutes: Anne (1702-1707)". Records of the Parliaments of Scotland to 1707. University of St Andrews.

== See also ==
- List of legislation in the United Kingdom
- Records of the Parliaments of Scotland
