= List of acts of the Parliament of Scotland from 1471 =

This is a list of acts of the Parliament of Scotland for the year 1471.

It lists acts of the old Parliament of Scotland, that was merged with the old Parliament of England to form the Parliament of Great Britain, by the Union with England Act 1707 (c. 7).

For other years, see list of acts of the Parliament of Scotland. For the period after 1707, see list of acts of the Parliament of Great Britain.

== 1471 ==
=== May ===
The 6th parliament of James III, held in Edinburgh from 6 May 1471 until 17 May 1471.

| Short title, or popular name | Citation | Royal assent |
Long title
| Church Act 1471 (repealed) | May 1471 c. 1 (Note: This is the citation in the Record Edition.) — (Note: This act is not listed in the Duodecimal Edition.) | 6 May 1471 |
Of the fredome and privilege of halikyrk. Of the freedom and privilege of the holy church. (Repealed by Statute Law Revision (Scotland) Act 1906 (6 Edw. 7. c. 38))
| Embassy to France Act 1471 (repealed) | May 1471 c. 2 — | 6 May 1471 |
Of ane ambaxate to be sende to the king of France (Note: Louis XI.) and the duc of Burgunye. (Note: Charles the Bold.); Of an embassy to be sent to the king of France and the duke of Burgundy. (Repealed by Statute Law Revision (Scotland) Act 1906 (6 Edw. 7. c. 38))
| Murder Act 1471 (repealed) | May 1471 c. 3; 1471 c. 42 (Note: This is the citation in the Duodecimal Edition.) | 6 May 1471 |
Act (Note: Murder Act 1469 (c. 11)) anentis the stanchyn of slachtir ratifeit with addicion. Act regarding the stanching of murder ratified with additions. (Repealed by Statute Law Revision (Scotland) Act 1906 (6 Edw. 7. c. 38))
| Barratry Act 1471 (repealed) | May 1471 c. 4 c. 43 | 6 May 1471 |
That na clerkis purches abbasyis and uthir beneficis at the court of Rome quhilkis was nocht thairat of befor—nor offices of collectory—nor unyownys and annexacionis of benefices. That no cleric purchase abbeys and other benefices at the court of Rome, which was not thereof before; nor offices of collectory; nor unions and annexations of benefices. (Repealed by Statute Law Revision (Scotland) Act 1906 (6 Edw. 7. c. 38))
| Artillery Act 1471 (repealed) | May 1471 c. 5 — | 6 May 1471 |
Of cartis of weir to be maid. Of carts of war to be made. (Repealed by Statute Law Revision (Scotland) Act 1906 (6 Edw. 7. c. 38))
| Armour Act 1471 (repealed) | May 1471 c. 6 c. 44 | 6 May 1471 |
Of armouris—and of wapynschawing. Of armour; and of wapinschaws. (Repealed by Statute Law Revision (Scotland) Act 1906 (6 Edw. 7. c. 38))
| Sumptuary Act 1471 (repealed) | May 1471 c. 7 c. 45 | 6 May 1471 |
Anent the weiring of silkis. Regarding the wearing of silks. (Repealed by Statute Law Revision (Scotland) Act 1906 (6 Edw. 7. c. 38))
| Currency Act 1471 (repealed) | May 1471 c. 8 c. 46 | 6 May 1471 |
Of the cours of the mone. Of the circulation of the money. (Repealed by Statute Law Revision (Scotland) Act 1906 (6 Edw. 7. c. 38))
| Manswearing Act 1471 (repealed) | May 1471 c. 9 c. 47 | 6 May 1471 |
For the eschewyn of maneswering of fals Inquestis and assisis. For the avoidance of perjury of false Inquests and assizes. (Repealed by Statute Law Revision (Scotland) Act 1906 (6 Edw. 7. c. 38))
| Sea Fishing Act 1471 (repealed) | May 1471 c. 10 c. 48 | 6 May 1471 |
Anent schippis and buschis for fysching. Regarding ships and busses for fishing. (Repealed by Statute Law Revision (Scotland) Act 1906 (6 Edw. 7. c. 38))
| Fines imposed by Lords of Council Act 1471 (repealed) | May 1471 c. 11 c. 49 | 6 May 1471 |
Of unlawis in accionis befor the lordis of consail. Of fines in actions before the lords of council. (Repealed by Statute Law Revision (Scotland) Act 1906 (6 Edw. 7. c. 38))
| Continuation of Parliament Act 1471 (repealed) | May 1471 c. 12 — | 6 May 1471 |
The personis that the power of the thre estatis is committit to. The persons that the power of the three estates is committed to. (Repealed by Statute Law Revision (Scotland) Act 1906 (6 Edw. 7. c. 38))

=== August ===
Continuing the 6th parliament of James III, held in Edinburgh from 2 August 1471 until 13 August 1471.

| Short title, or popular name | Citation | Royal assent |
Long title
| Brieves Act 1471 (repealed) | Vol. II, p. 101 (Note: This is the citation in the Record Edition.); 1471 c. 41 (Note: This is the citation in the Duodecimal Edition.) | 2 August 1471 |
(Repealed by Statute Law Revision (Scotland) Act 1906 (6 Edw. 7. c. 38))

=== Sources ===
- Alexander, William (1841). "Acta Parliamentorum Regis Jacobi Tertii". An Abridgement of the Acts of the Parliaments of Scotland. Edinburgh: Adam and Charles Black. p. 443 – via Google Books.
- Alexander, William (1841). "Acta Parliamentorum Regis Jacobi Tertii". An Abridgement of the Acts of the Parliaments of Scotland. Edinburgh: Adam and Charles Black. p. 443 – via Google Books.
- Chronological Table of the Statutes. London: Her Majesty's Stationery Office. 1972. p. 1321 – via Google Books.
- "Index of Statutes: James III (1460-1488)". Records of the Parliaments of Scotland to 1707. University of St Andrews.

== See also ==
- List of legislation in the United Kingdom
- Records of the Parliaments of Scotland
