= List of acts of the Parliament of Scotland =

This is a list of acts of the Parliament of Scotland, which was in existence until 1707.

- List of acts of the Parliament of Scotland from 1424
- List of acts of the Parliament of Scotland from 1425
- List of acts of the Parliament of Scotland from 1426
- List of acts of the Parliament of Scotland from 1427
- List of acts of the Parliament of Scotland from 1428
- List of acts of the Parliament of Scotland from 1429

- List of acts of the Parliament of Scotland from 1431
- List of acts of the Parliament of Scotland from 1432
- List of acts of the Parliament of Scotland from 1433
- List of acts of the Parliament of Scotland from 1434
- List of acts of the Parliament of Scotland from 1436
- List of acts of the Parliament of Scotland from 1437
- List of acts of the Parliament of Scotland from 1438

- List of acts of the Parliament of Scotland from 1440
- List of acts of the Parliament of Scotland from 1443
- List of acts of the Parliament of Scotland from 1445
- List of acts of the Parliament of Scotland from 1449

- List of acts of the Parliament of Scotland from 1450
- List of acts of the Parliament of Scotland from 1451
- List of acts of the Parliament of Scotland from 1452
- List of acts of the Parliament of Scotland from 1454
- List of acts of the Parliament of Scotland from 1455
- List of acts of the Parliament of Scotland from 1456
- List of acts of the Parliament of Scotland from 1457

- List of acts of the Parliament of Scotland from 1466
- List of acts of the Parliament of Scotland from 1467
- List of acts of the Parliament of Scotland from 1468
- List of acts of the Parliament of Scotland from 1469

- List of acts of the Parliament of Scotland from 1471
- List of acts of the Parliament of Scotland from 1474
- List of acts of the Parliament of Scotland from 1475
- List of acts of the Parliament of Scotland from 1476
- List of acts of the Parliament of Scotland from 1478

- List of acts of the Parliament of Scotland from 1481
- List of acts of the Parliament of Scotland from 1482
- List of acts of the Parliament of Scotland from 1483
- List of acts of the Parliament of Scotland from 1485
- List of acts of the Parliament of Scotland from 1486
- List of acts of the Parliament of Scotland from 1487
- List of acts of the Parliament of Scotland from 1488
- List of acts of the Parliament of Scotland from 1489

- List of acts of the Parliament of Scotland from 1491
- List of acts of the Parliament of Scotland from 1493
- List of acts of the Parliament of Scotland from 1496

- List of acts of the Parliament of Scotland from 1503
- List of acts of the Parliament of Scotland from 1504
- List of acts of the Parliament of Scotland from 1509

- List of acts of the Parliament of Scotland from 1515

- List of acts of the Parliament of Scotland from 1522
- List of acts of the Parliament of Scotland from 1524
- List of acts of the Parliament of Scotland from 1525
- List of acts of the Parliament of Scotland from 1526
- List of acts of the Parliament of Scotland from 1528

- List of acts of the Parliament of Scotland from 1532
- List of acts of the Parliament of Scotland from 1535

- List of acts of the Parliament of Scotland from 1540
- List of acts of the Parliament of Scotland from 1542
- List of acts of the Parliament of Scotland from 1543
- List of acts of the Parliament of Scotland from 1545

- List of acts of the Parliament of Scotland from 1551
- List of acts of the Parliament of Scotland from 1555
- List of acts of the Parliament of Scotland from 1557
- List of acts of the Parliament of Scotland from 1558

- List of acts of the Parliament of Scotland from 1560
- List of acts of the Parliament of Scotland from 1563
- List of acts of the Parliament of Scotland from 1564
- List of acts of the Parliament of Scotland from 1567

- List of acts of the Parliament of Scotland from 1571
- List of acts of the Parliament of Scotland from 1572
- List of acts of the Parliament of Scotland from 1573
- List of acts of the Parliament of Scotland from 1578
- List of acts of the Parliament of Scotland from 1579

- List of acts of the Parliament of Scotland from 1581
- List of acts of the Parliament of Scotland from 1584
- List of acts of the Parliament of Scotland from 1585
- List of acts of the Parliament of Scotland from 1587

- List of acts of the Parliament of Scotland from 1592
- List of acts of the Parliament of Scotland from 1593
- List of acts of the Parliament of Scotland from 1594
- List of acts of the Parliament of Scotland from 1597

- List of acts of the Parliament of Scotland from 1600
- List of acts of the Parliament of Scotland from 1604
- List of acts of the Parliament of Scotland from 1606
- List of acts of the Parliament of Scotland from 1607
- List of acts of the Parliament of Scotland from 1609

- List of acts of the Parliament of Scotland from 1612
- List of acts of the Parliament of Scotland from 1617

- List of acts of the Parliament of Scotland from 1621

- List of acts of the Parliament of Scotland from 1633

- List of acts of the Parliament of Scotland, 1639–1651

- List of acts of the Parliament of Scotland from 1661
- List of acts of the Parliament of Scotland from 1662
- List of acts of the Parliament of Scotland from 1663
- List of acts of the Parliament of Scotland from 1669

- List of acts of the Parliament of Scotland from 1670
- List of acts of the Parliament of Scotland from 1672
- List of acts of the Parliament of Scotland from 1673

- List of acts of the Parliament of Scotland from 1681
- List of acts of the Parliament of Scotland from 1685
- List of acts of the Parliament of Scotland from 1686
- List of acts of the Parliament of Scotland from 1689

- List of acts of the Parliament of Scotland from 1690
- List of acts of the Parliament of Scotland from 1693
- List of acts of the Parliament of Scotland from 1695
- List of acts of the Parliament of Scotland from 1696
- List of acts of the Parliament of Scotland from 1698

- List of acts of the Parliament of Scotland from 1700
- List of acts of the Parliament of Scotland from 1701
- List of acts of the Parliament of Scotland from 1702
- List of acts of the Parliament of Scotland from 1703
- List of acts of the Parliament of Scotland from 1704
- List of acts of the Parliament of Scotland from 1705
- List of acts of the Parliament of Scotland from 1706
- List of acts of the Parliament of Scotland from 1707

== See also ==
For acts passed from 1707 to 1800, see the list of acts of the Parliament of Great Britain.

For acts passed from 1801 onwards, see the list of acts of the Parliament of the United Kingdom.

See also the list of acts of the Parliament of England and list of acts of the Parliament of Ireland.
