= List of acts of the Parliament of Scotland from 1604 =

This is a list of acts of the Parliament of Scotland for the year 1604.

It lists acts of Parliament of the old Parliament of Scotland, that was merged with the old Parliament of England to form the Parliament of Great Britain, by the Union with England Act 1707 (c. 7).

For other years, see list of acts of the Parliament of Scotland. For the period after 1707, see list of acts of the Parliament of Great Britain.

== 1604 ==
The 17th parliament of James VI, held in Edinburgh from 10 April 1604 until 11 July 1604.

Short title, or popular name	Citation	Royal assent
Long title
Union with England Act 1604 (repealed)	1604 c. 1 (Note: This is the citation in the Record Edition.); 1604 c. 1 (Note: This is the citation in the Duodecimal Edition.)	11 July 1604
Commissioun for the Unioun. Commission for the Union. (Repealed by Statute Law Revision (Scotland) Act 1906 (6 Edw. 7. c. 38))
Church Act 1604 (repealed)	1604 c. 2 — (Note: This act is not listed in the Duodecimal Edition.)	11 July 1604
Act in favouris of the kirk. Act in favour of the church. (Repealed by Statute Law Revision (Scotland) Act 1906 (6 Edw. 7. c. 38))
Not public and general	1604 c. 3 —	11 July 1604
The foirfaltour of Williame Borthuik Sowtray.
Not public and general	1604 c. 4 —	11 July 1604
The foirfaltrie of Thomas Kennedie.
Not public and general	1604 c. 5 —	11 July 1604
The summondis of treassoun of umquhile Walter Mure of Cloncarde past fra simpliciter be oure soverane lordis advocatt.
Not public and general	1604 c. 6 —	11 July 1604
Commissioun to the Lordis of Sessioun to decyde the actioun of reductioun of the foirfaltrie of James Wod apperand of Bonytoun.
Not public and general	1604 c. 7 —	11 July 1604
Act anent the restitutioun of James Dowglas of Spott.
Not public and general	1604 c. 8 —	11 July 1604
Act anent the restitutioun of Maister Thomas Cranstoun.

=== Sources ===
- Alexander, William (1841). "Acta Parliamentorum Regis Jacobi Sexti". An Abridgement of the Acts of the Parliaments of Scotland. Edinburgh: Adam and Charles Black. p. A38 – via Google Books.
- Alexander, William (1841). "Acta Parliamentorum Regis Jacobi Sexti". An Abridgement of the Acts of the Parliaments of Scotland. Edinburgh: Adam and Charles Black. p. A38 – via Google Books.
- Chronological Table of the Statutes. London: Her Majesty's Stationery Office. 1972. p. 1345 – via Google Books.
- "Index of Statutes: Index of Statutes: James VI (1567-1625)". Records of the Parliaments of Scotland to 1707. University of St Andrews.

== See also ==
- List of legislation in the United Kingdom
- Records of the Parliaments of Scotland
