= List of acts of the Parliament of Scotland from 1481 =

This is a list of acts of the Parliament of Scotland for the year 1481.

It lists acts of Parliament of the old Parliament of Scotland, that was merged with the old Parliament of England to form the Parliament of Great Britain, by the Union with England Act 1707 (c. 7).

For other years, see list of acts of the Parliament of Scotland. For the period after 1707, see list of acts of the Parliament of Great Britain.

== 1481 ==
=== April ===
The 11th parliament of James III.

Short title, or popular name	Citation	Royal assent
Long title
Defence of the Realm Act 1481 (repealed)	April 1481 c. 1 (Note: This is the citation in the Record Edition.) — (Note: This act is not listed in the Duodecimal Edition.)	2 April 1481
The liegis to be warnyt to be redy to cum to the king bodin in feir of were. The lieges to be warned to be ready to come to the king armed in fear of war. (Repealed by Statute Law Revision (Scotland) Act 1906 (6 Edw. 7. c. 38))
Defence of the Realm (No. 2) Act 1481 (repealed)	April 1481 c. 2; 1481 c. 80 (Note: This is the citation in the Duodecimal Edition.)	2 April 1481
Of speris and jakkis. Of spears and jerkins. (Repealed by Statute Law Revision (Scotland) Act 1906 (6 Edw. 7. c. 38))
Defence of the Realm (No. 3) Act 1481 (repealed)	April 1481 c. 3 —	2 April 1481
Of targeis. Of targets. (Repealed by Statute Law Revision (Scotland) Act 1906 (6 Edw. 7. c. 38))
Defence of the Realm (No. 4) Act 1481 (repealed)	April 1481 c. 4; 1481 c. 81	2 April 1481
Anent personis cummand to the oist. About persons commanded to the army. (Repealed by Statute Law Revision (Scotland) Act 1906 (6 Edw. 7. c. 38))
Defence of the Realm (No. 5) Act 1481 (repealed)	April 1481 c. 5 —	2 April 1481
Of the execucioun of the actis anent the wapinschawin and abilyement for were. Of the execution of the acts about the wapinshaws and equipment for war. (Repealed by Statute Law Revision (Scotland) Act 1906 (6 Edw. 7. c. 38))
Defence of the Realm (No. 6) Act 1481 (repealed)	April 1481 c. 6; 1481 c. 82	2 April 1481
For reparaling and stuffing the kingis castellis. For repairing and supplying the king's castles. (Repealed by Statute Law Revision (Scotland) Act 1906 (6 Edw. 7. c. 38))
Benefices Act 1481 (repealed)	April 1481 c. 7 —	2 April 1481
Anent the privilege of the croun tueching the presentacions of beneficis the tyme of the vacacioun of the sege of bischoppis. About the privilege of the crown touching the presentations of benefices in the time of vacancy of the see of bishops. (Repealed by Statute Law Revision (Scotland) Act 1906 (6 Edw. 7. c. 38))

=== March ===
Continuing the 11th parliament of James III, held from 18 March.

Short title, or popular name	Citation	Royal assent
Long title
England Act 1481 (repealed)	March 1481 c. 1 (Note: This is the citation in the Record Edition.) — (Note: This act is not listed in the Duodecimal Edition.)	22 March 1482
Of the breking of the trewis be the revare Edward calland him king of Ingland. Of the breaking of the truce by the reiver Edward calling himself king of England. (Repealed by Statute Law Revision (Scotland) Act 1906 (6 Edw. 7. c. 38))
Defence of the Realm (No. 7) Act 1481 (repealed)	March 1481 c. 2 —	22 March 1482
Grant to the king and promit be the estates to abide with thare persons and substance in his defence. Grant to the king and promise by the estate to abide with their persons and substance in his defence. (Repealed by Statute Law Revision (Scotland) Act 1906 (6 Edw. 7. c. 38))
Administration of Justice Act 1481 (repealed)	March 1481 c. 3 —	22 March 1482
The kingis promit for ministracione of justice and gude reull. The king's promise for administration of justice and good rule. (Repealed by Statute Law Revision (Scotland) Act 1906 (6 Edw. 7. c. 38))
Defence of the Realm (No. 8) Act 1481 (repealed)	March 1481 c. 4 —	22 March 1482
The maner of redynes for resisting and aganestanding of the said revare Edward. The manner of redress for resisting and standing against the said reiver Edward. (Repealed by Statute Law Revision (Scotland) Act 1906 (6 Edw. 7. c. 38))
Defence of the Realm (No. 9) Act 1481 (repealed)	March 1481 c. 5 —	22 March 1482
Of the beraris of the kingis letteris to warne his liegis. Of the carrying of the king's letters to warn his lieges. (Repealed by Statute Law Revision (Scotland) Act 1906 (6 Edw. 7. c. 38))
Defence of the Realm (No. 10) Act 1481 (repealed)	March 1481 c. 6 —	22 March 1482
Twiching the resisting of the tratour James of Dowglace. Touching the resisting of the traitor James of Douglas. (Repealed by Statute Law Revision (Scotland) Act 1906 (6 Edw. 7. c. 38))
Defence of the Realm (No. 11) Act 1481 (repealed)	March 1481 c. 7 —	22 March 1482
Grant of vi^{c} men of were to be layd in garnysoun on the bordouris. Grant of 600 men of war to be placed in garrison on the borders. (Repealed by Statute Law Revision (Scotland) Act 1906 (6 Edw. 7. c. 38))
Defence of the Realm (No. 12) Act 1481 (repealed)	March 1481 c. 8 —	22 March 1482
Of the placis that the said men of were salbe layd in. Of the place that the said men of war shall be put. (Repealed by Statute Law Revision (Scotland) Act 1906 (6 Edw. 7. c. 38))
Defence of the Realm (No. 13) Act 1481 (repealed)	March 1481 c. 9 —	22 March 1482
Of the capitanis of the saidis placis. Of the captains of the said places. (Repealed by Statute Law Revision (Scotland) Act 1906 (6 Edw. 7. c. 38))
Defence of the Realm (No. 14) Act 1481 (repealed)	March 1481 c. 10 —	22 March 1482
Of the waigis of the Capitanys foresaide. Of the wages of the Captains aforesaid. (Repealed by Statute Law Revision (Scotland) Act 1906 (6 Edw. 7. c. 38))
Defence of the Realm (No. 15) Act 1481 (repealed)	March 1481 c. 11 —	22 March 1482
Of the wardane on the west bordouris. Of the warden on the West Borders. (Repealed by Statute Law Revision (Scotland) Act 1906 (6 Edw. 7. c. 38))
Defence of the Realm (No. 16) Act 1481 (repealed)	March 1481 c. 12 —	22 March 1482
Anent the punitioun of personis quhilkis favouris the tratour James of Dowglas. About the punishment of persons who favour the traitor James of Douglas. (Repealed by Statute Law Revision (Scotland) Act 1906 (6 Edw. 7. c. 38))
Embassy to France Act 1481 (repealed)	March 1481 c. 13 —	22 March 1482
Of an ambaxat to the king of France for help and supplie. Of an embassy to the king of France for help and supplies. (Repealed by Statute Law Revision (Scotland) Act 1906 (6 Edw. 7. c. 38))
Wife's Ratification Act 1481 (repealed)	March 1481 c. 14; 1481 c. 83 (Note: This is the citation in the Duodecimal Edition.)	22 March 1482
Memorandum of a deliverance of the lordis of Counsale anent a revocacione maid be a woman havand conjunctfeftment eftir hir husbandis deceis. Memorandum of a judgement of the lords of Council about a revocation made by a woman having joint investment after her husband's death. (Repealed by Statute Law Revision (Scotland) Act 1964 (c. 80))
Not public and general	March 1481 c. 15 —	22 March 1482
Ratification of the actis maid of befoir tuiching the Indult and privilege grantit be the paip to the sege of Sanctandrois. Ratification of the acts made previously touching the indult and privilege granted by the pope to the see of St Andrews.
Benefices (No. 2) Act 1481 (repealed)	March 1481 c. 16; 1481 c. 84	22 March 1482
Of the privilege of the croun anent the presentacioun of benefices in the tyme of the vacacioun of the segis of bischopis. Of the privilege of the crown regarding the presentation of benefices in the time of the vacancy of the sees of bishops. (Repealed by Statute Law Revision (Scotland) Act 1906 (6 Edw. 7. c. 38))
Barratry Act 1481 (repealed)	March 1481 c. 17; 1481 c. 85	22 March 1482
Of the punitioun of thame that takis officis of procuratioun &c. contrare the said privilege. Of the punishment of those that take offices of procuration etc. contrary to the said privilege. (Repealed by Statute Law Revision (Scotland) Act 1906 (6 Edw. 7. c. 38))
Imports Act 1481 (repealed)	March 1481 c. 18 —	22 March 1482
For the inbringing of merchandice and vittalis in the realme be strangearis and alienaris. For the importation of merchandise and victuals in the realm by foreigners and aliens. (Repealed by Statute Law Revision (Scotland) Act 1906 (6 Edw. 7. c. 38))
Courts of Purprision Act 1481 (repealed)	Vol. II, p. 141; 1481 c. 79	23 March 1482
(Repealed by Statute Law Revision (Scotland) Act 1906 (6 Edw. 7. c. 38))

=== Sources ===
- Alexander, William (1841). "Acta Parliamentorum Regis Jacobi Tertii". An Abridgement of the Acts of the Parliaments of Scotland. Edinburgh: Adam and Charles Black. pp. 444–445 – via Google Books.
- Alexander, William (1841). "Acta Parliamentorum Regis Jacobi Tertii". An Abridgement of the Acts of the Parliaments of Scotland. Edinburgh: Adam and Charles Black. pp. 444–445 – via Google Books.
- Chronological Table of the Statutes. London: Her Majesty's Stationery Office. 1972. p. 1322 – via Google Books.
- "Index of Statutes: James III (1460-1488)". Records of the Parliaments of Scotland to 1707. University of St Andrews.

== See also ==
- List of legislation in the United Kingdom
- Records of the Parliaments of Scotland
