= List of acts of the Parliament of Scotland from 1432 =

This is a list of acts of the Parliament of Scotland for the year 1432.

It lists acts of Parliament of the old Parliament of Scotland, that was merged with the old Parliament of England to form the Parliament of Great Britain, by the Union with England Act 1707 (c. 7).

For other years, see list of acts of the Parliament of Scotland. For the period after 1707, see list of acts of the Parliament of Great Britain.

== 1432 ==
A parliament of James I.

Short title, or popular name	Citation	Royal assent
Long title
Murder Act 1432 (repealed)	1432 c. 1 (Note: This is the citation in the Record Edition.); 1432 c. 89 (Note: This is the citation in the Duodecimal Edition.)	27 May 1432
Of the persute of thaim that committis slauchter. Of the pursuit of those that commit murder. (Repealed by Statute Law Revision (Scotland) Act 1906 (6 Edw. 7. c. 38))
Murder (No. 2) Act 1432 (repealed)	1432 c. 2; 1432 c. 90	27 May 1432
Of the slaar fugitive fra the law and proclamacion to be maid not to resett him. Of the murderer fugitive from the law, and the proclamation to be made not to harbour him. (Repealed by Statute Law Revision (Scotland) Act 1906 (6 Edw. 7. c. 38))
Murder (No. 3) Act 1432 (repealed)	1432 c. 3; 1432 c. 91	27 May 1432
Of slauchter within a barony. Of murder within a barony. (Repealed by Statute Law Revision (Scotland) Act 1906 (6 Edw. 7. c. 38))
Murder (No. 4) Act 1432 (repealed)	1432 c. 4; 1432 c. 92	27 May 1432
Of slauchter done within burgh. Of murder done within a burgh. (Repealed by Statute Law Revision (Scotland) Act 1906 (6 Edw. 7. c. 38))
Murder (No. 5) Act 1432 (repealed)	1432 c. 5; 1432 c. 93	27 May 1432
Of schireffis and ministeris of Regalite that executis nocht the law beforsaid. Of sheriffs and ministers of regality that do not execute the beforesaid law. (Repealed by Statute Law Revision (Scotland) Act 1906 (6 Edw. 7. c. 38))
Murder (No. 6) Act 1432 (repealed)	1432 c. 6; 1432 c. 94	27 May 1432
Of Lordis of Regalite and Aldermen and Balyeis in burgh that executis nocht the law. Of Lords of Regality, and Aldermen and Bailies in burghs that do not execute the law. (Repealed by Statute Law Revision (Scotland) Act 1906 (6 Edw. 7. c. 38))
Murder (No. 7) Act 1432 (repealed)	1432 c. 7; 1432 c. 95	27 May 1432
Of barganis in burgh or on lande and inquisicion thairanent whither it be forthocht felony or suddandly done. Of fights in burghs or on to land, and investigation thereby whether it is forethought felony or suddenly done. (Repealed by Statute Law Revision (Scotland) Act 1906 (6 Edw. 7. c. 38))
Murder (No. 8) Act 1432 (repealed)	1432 c. 8; 1432 c. 96	27 May 1432
Of fugitouris fra burghis in forthocht felony. Of fugitives from burghs in forethought felony. (Repealed by Statute Law Revision (Scotland) Act 1906 (6 Edw. 7. c. 38))
Murder (No. 9) Act 1432 (repealed)	1432 c. 9; 1432 c. 97	27 May 1432
Of hurtis and slauchteris done be the frendis of assoverit partiis. Of harm or murder done by the friends of assured parties. (Repealed by Statute Law Revision (Scotland) Act 1906 (6 Edw. 7. c. 38))
Murder (No. 10) Act 1432 (repealed)	1432 c. 10; 1432 c. 98	27 May 1432
Of the punicion of thaim that rise nocht in suppowel of the schireff persewand fugitouris with the kingis horne. Of the punishment of those that do not rise in support of the sheriff pursuing fugitives with the king's horn. (Repealed by Statute Law Revision (Scotland) Act 1906 (6 Edw. 7. c. 38))
Officer's Wands Act 1432 (repealed)	1432 c. 11; 1432 c. 99	27 May 1432
That the kingis officiaris and the officiaris of regaliteis and burghis haif wandis and hornis. That the king's officials and the officials of regalities and burghs have wands and horns. (Repealed by Statute Law Revision (Scotland) Act 1906 (6 Edw. 7. c. 38))

=== Sources ===
- Alexander, William (1841). "Acta Parliamentorum Regis Jacobi Primi". An Abridgement of the Acts of the Parliaments of Scotland. Edinburgh: Adam and Charles Black. p. 440 – via Google Books.
- Alexander, William (1841). "Acta Parliamentorum Regis Jacobi Primi". An Abridgement of the Acts of the Parliaments of Scotland. Edinburgh: Adam and Charles Black. p. 440 – via Google Books.
- Chronological Table of the Statutes. London: Her Majesty's Stationery Office. 1972. pp. 1316–1317 – via Google Books.
- "Index of Statutes: James I (1406-1337)". Records of the Parliaments of Scotland to 1707. University of St Andrews.

== See also ==
- List of legislation in the United Kingdom
- Records of the Parliaments of Scotland
