= List of acts of the Parliament of Scotland from 1450 =

This is a list of acts of the Parliament of Scotland for the years 1450 to 1457.

It lists acts of Parliament of the old Parliament of Scotland, that was merged with the old Parliament of England to form the Parliament of Great Britain, by the Union with England Act 1707 (c. 7).

For other years, see list of acts of the Parliament of Scotland. For the period after 1707, see list of acts of the Parliament of Great Britain.

== 1450 ==
The 7th parliament of James II, held in Perth on 4 May 1450.

Short title, or popular name	Citation	Royal assent
Long title
Poison Act 1450 (repealed)	1450 c. 1 (Note: This is the citation in the Record Edition.); 1450 c. 31 (Note: This is the citation in the Duodecimal Edition.)	4 May 1450
Of the bringing in of poyson be ony person of the realme. Of the bringing in of poison by any person of the realm. (Repealed by Statute Law Revision (Scotland) Act 1906 (6 Edw. 7. c. 38))
Poison (No. 2) Act 1450 (repealed)	1450 c. 2; 1450 c. 32	4 May 1450
Of the bringing in of poyson by strangearis. Of the bringing in of poison by foreigners. (Repealed by Statute Law Revision (Scotland) Act 1906 (6 Edw. 7. c. 38))

=== Sources ===
- Alexander, William (1841). "Acta Parliamentorum Regis Jacobi Secundi". An Abridgement of the Acts of the Parliaments of Scotland. Edinburgh: Adam and Charles Black. p. 441 – via Google Books.
- Alexander, William (1841). "Acta Parliamentorum Regis Jacobi Secundi". An Abridgement of the Acts of the Parliaments of Scotland. Edinburgh: Adam and Charles Black. p. 441 – via Google Books.
- Chronological Table of the Statutes. London: Her Majesty's Stationery Office. 1972. p. 1318 – via Google Books.
- "Index of Statutes: James II (1437-1460)". Records of the Parliaments of Scotland to 1707. University of St Andrews.

== See also ==
- List of legislation in the United Kingdom
- Records of the Parliaments of Scotland
