= List of acts of the Parliament of Scotland from 1670 =

This is a list of acts of the Parliament of Scotland for the year 1670.

It lists acts of Parliament of the old Parliament of Scotland, that was merged with the old Parliament of England to form the Parliament of Great Britain, by the Union with England Act 1707 (c. 7).

For other years, see list of acts of the Parliament of Scotland. For the period after 1707, see list of acts of the Parliament of Great Britain.

== 1670 ==
The 2nd session of the 2nd parliament of Charles II, held in Edinburgh from 22 July 1670.

Short title, or popular name	Citation	Royal assent
Long title
Treaty with England Act 1670 (repealed)	1670 c. 1 (Note: This is the citation in the Record Edition.); 1670 c. 1 (Note: This is the citation in the Duodecimal Edition.)	30 July 1670
Act authorizeing certane Commissioners of the Kingdome of Scotland to treat with Commissioners of England for the weel of both Kingdoms. Act authorising certain Commissioners of the Kingdom of Scotland to treat with the Commissioners of England for the benefit of both Kingdoms. (Repealed by Statute Law Revision (Scotland) Act 1906 (6 Edw. 7. c. 38))
Delinquents Act 1670 (repealed)	1670 c. 2; 1670 c. 2	3 August 1670
Act against such who shall refuse to depone against Delinquents. (Repealed by Confession of Faith Ratification Act 1690 (c. 7))
Supply Act 1670 (repealed)	1670 c. 3; 1670 c. 3	5 August 1670
Act for raising a supply of 360000 punds Scots offered to his Majestie. Act for raising a supply of 36,000 pounds Scots, offered to his Majesty. (Repealed by Statute Law Revision (Scotland) Act 1906 (6 Edw. 7. c. 38))
Invading of Ministers Act 1670 (repealed)	1670 c. 4; 1670 c. 4	13 August 1670
Act against invading of Ministers. Act against invading of Ministers. (Repealed by Statute Law Revision (Scotland) Act 1906 (6 Edw. 7. c. 38))
Conventicles Act (Scotland) 1670 (repealed)	1670 c. 5; 1670 c. 5	13 August 1670
Act against Conventicles. Act against Conventicles. (Repealed by Statute Law Repeal (No. 2) Act 1690 (c. 57))
Irregular Baptisms Act 1670 (repealed)	1670 c. 6; 1670 c. 6	17 August 1670
Act against disorderly Baptisms. Act against disorderly Baptisms. (Repealed by Statute Law Repeal (No. 2) Act 1690 (c. 57))
Lauder and Duns Act 1670 (repealed)	1670 c. 7 — (Note: This act is not listed in the Duodecimal Edition.)	17 August 1670
Act concerning legall Executions to be used at the touns of Lauder and Dunce. (Repealed by Statute Law Revision (Scotland) Act 1906 (6 Edw. 7. c. 38))
Divine Worship Act 1670 (repealed)	1670 c. 8; 1670 c. 7	20 August 1670
Act against separation and withdrawing from the publict meetings for Divyne Worship. (Repealed by Statute Law Repeal (No. 2) Act 1690 (c. 57))
Not public and general	1670 c. 9 —	20 August 1670
Act of Exoneration to the Duke and Dutches of Hamiltoun and the Earl of Southesk of certain sums dew by them to umquhill the Earl of Forth.
Not public and general	1670 c. 10 —	20 August 1670
Act of Exoneration to Gilbert Earle of Erroll and his Cautioners of sums dew to the deceast Earl of Forth.
Not public and general	1670 c. 11 —	20 August 1670
Act in favors of the Countes of Bramfoord and Ladie Forrester for extracting the Act Rescissory of the Earl of Forths forfeiture.
Lords of Session Act 1670 (repealed)	1670 c. 12; 1670 c. 8	22 August 1670
Act ratifieing the priviledges of the ordinary Lords of Session. Act ratifying the privileges of the ordinary Lords of Session. (Repealed by Statute Law Revision (Scotland) Act 1906 (6 Edw. 7. c. 38))
Highways Act 1670 (repealed)	1670 c. 13; 1670 c. 9	22 August 1670
Act concerning heigh wayes. Act concerning highways. (Repealed by Statute Law Revision (Scotland) Act 1906 (6 Edw. 7. c. 38))
Not public and general	1670 c. 14 —	22 August 1670
Act in favors of the toune of Anstruther for ane Imposition upon Wyne &c.
Not public and general	1670 c. 15 —	22 August 1670
Act uniting the Kirks of Inchsture & Rossie.
Not public and general	1670 c. 16 —	22 August 1670
Act for ane imposition for upholding the Bridge of Dalkeith.
Not public and general	1670 c. 17 —	22 August 1670
Act in favours of William Scott of Ardross for the vacand stipend of the kirk of Elie.
Not public and general	1670 c. 18 —	22 August 1670
Act in favours of James Marques of Douglas for three new fairs to the burgh of Kirrymure.
Not public and general	1670 c. 19 —	22 August 1670
Act in favors of William Buchannan of Drumakill for tuo faires to be kept at Drimon.
Not public and general	1670 c. 20 —	22 August 1670
Act in favours of James Marques of Montrose for fairs to be keept at Killerne and Strablane.
Not public and general	1670 c. 21 —	22 August 1670
Act in favours of George Earle of Linlithgow for tuo fairs and a weekly mercat at Waterstoun.
Not public and general	1670 c. 22 —	22 August 1670
Act in favors of John Forbes of Cullodin for tuo fairs at Mulchaich.
Not public and general	1670 c. 23 —	22 August 1670
Act in favors of Collonell George Keith for a fair and weekly mercat at the Kirtoun of Newdeir.
Not public and general	1670 c. 24 —	22 August 1670
Act in favors of Charles Earle of Mar for a fair and weekly mercat at Kildrumie.
Not public and general	1670 c. 25 —	22 August 1670
Act in favors of Sir John Cuninghame of Lambrughtoun Advocat for repairing the kirks of Dreghorne and Kilmares.
Not public and general	1670 c. 26 —	22 August 1670
Act adding some persons to be Commissioners for valuations in Stirling shyre.
Not public and general	1670 c. 27 —	22 August 1670
Act and Warrant in favors of Thomas Rochheid of Whytesomehill for leading of teinds.
Not public and general	1670 c. 28 —	22 August 1670
Act in favors of Alexander Lord Saltoun for rectifieing the Valuation of the Lands of Balveny.
Not public and general	1670 c. 29 —	22 August 1670
Act in favours of John Forbes of Cullodin for rectifying the valuation of the lands of Ferintosh.
Not public and general	1670 c. 30 —	22 August 1670
Act in favors of Sir George Kinnaird of Rossie anent some vacand stipends for repairing the Kirk of Inchsture.
Not public and general	1670 c. 31 —	22 August 1670
Act appointing certain new Commissioners for assessments in the shyre of Caithnes.
Not public and general	1670 c. 32 —	22 August 1670
Act in favors of John Earle of Middleton for a weekly mercat to be keept at Fettercairne.
Not public and general	1670 c. 33 —	22 August 1670
Ratification of ane Act of the Provost Baillifs and Council of the burgh of Edinburgh in favors of Robert Baird of Sauchtounhall.
Not public and general	1670 c. 34 —	22 August 1670
Ratification of the rychts of the University and Colledge of Old Aberdeen.
Not public and general	1670 c. 35 —	22 August 1670
Ratification in favors of John Wedderburn son of Sir Alex^{r} Wedderburn of Blacknes knight.
Not public and general	1670 c. 36 —	22 August 1670
Ratification in favors of Patrick Leslie of Balquhane of the lands and barony of Balquhane &c.
Not public and general	1670 c. 37 —	22 August 1670
Ratification in favors of S^{r} Colline Campbell of Aberurquhill of the Lands and Barony of Aberurquhill.
Not public and general	1670 c. 38 —	22 August 1670
Ratification in favors of Generall Thomas Dalyell of Binns.
Not public and general	1670 c. 39 —	22 August 1670
Ratification in favors of S^{r} Peter Wedderburne of Gosford knight.
Not public and general	1670 c. 40 —	22 August 1670
Ratification in favors of Alexander Monro Advocat.
Not public and general	1670 c. 41 —	22 August 1670
Ratification in favours of Alexander Lord Saltoun of the title and dignity of The Lord Abernethy of Saltoun.
Not public and general	1670 c. 42 —	22 August 1670
Ratification in favours of the toun of Kirkwall of their rights and privileges.
Not public and general	1670 c. 43 —	22 August 1670
Ratification in favors of James Cockburne of that Ilk of the lands and barony of Cockburn &c.
Not public and general	1670 c. 44 —	22 August 1670
Act and Ratification in favors of Chirurgeans Apothecarie Chirurgeans and Apothecaries in Edinburgh of their rights and priviledges.
Not public and general	1670 c. 45 —	22 August 1670
Ratification in favors of James Borthwick of Stow of the Town and Lands of Stowc.
Not public and general	1670 c. 46 —	22 August 1670
Ratification in favors of Henry M^{c}dougall of M^{c}Cairstoun of the lands and barony of M^{c}Cairstoun.
Not public and general	1670 c. 47 —	22 August 1670
Ratification in favors of William Blair of Kinfauns.
Not public and general	1670 c. 48 —	22 August 1670
Ratification in favors of Colline Campbell of Monzie of the lands and barony of Monzie.
Not public and general	1670 c. 49 —	22 August 1670
Ratification in favors of Charles Maitland of Haltoun of the lands and barony of Dundie, &c.
Not public and general	1670 c. 50 —	22 August 1670
Ratification in favors of Charles Maitland of Haltoun of the office of Generall of his Majesties Cunyiehouse.
Not public and general	1670 c. 51 —	22 August 1670
Ratification in favors of the members of the Minthous.
Not public and general	1670 c. 52 —	22 August 1670
Ratification in favors of S^{r} Robert Sinclair of Longformacus knight of the lands and tenandry of Hairheid &c.
Not public and general	1670 c. 53 —	22 August 1670
Ratification in favours of S^{r} Robert Nairn of Straithurd knight.
Not public and general	1670 c. 54 —	22 August 1670
Ratification in favours of John Cuningham of Caldwell.
Not public and general	1670 c. 55 —	22 August 1670
Ratification of a Chartor in favours of Sr George Ogilvy of Barras and William Ogilvie his son, changing the holding of his lands of Barras to free blench ferme.
Not public and general	1670 c. 56 —	22 August 1670
Ratification in favours of the burgh of Edinburgh of the late imposition upon wyne &c.
Not public and general	1670 c. 57 —	22 August 1670
Ratification in favours of Robert Douglas of Bridgford.
Not public and general	1670 c. 58 —	22 August 1670
Ratification in favours of S^{r} James Mercer of Adie knight of the lands and barony of Meiklour &c.
Not public and general	1670 c. 59 —	22 August 1670
Ratification in favors of George Earle of Wintoun of the Lands Lordships and baronies of Seatoun and Wintoun &c.
Not public and general	1670 c. 60 —	22 August 1670
Ratification in favors of Alexander Earle of Eglintoun of the Earledom of Eglintoun.
Not public and general	1670 c. 61 —	22 August 1670
Ratification in favors of S^{r} George Monro of Culraine knight of the baronie of Culraine &c.
Saving the Rights Act 1670 Not public and general	1670 c. 62; 1670 c. 10	22 August 1670
Act Salvo Jure Cujuslibet. Act Salvo Jure Cujuslibet.
Adjournment Act 1670 (repealed)	1670 c. 63; 1670 c. 11	22 August 1670
Act of Adjournment. Act of Adjournment. (Repealed by Statute Law Revision (Scotland) Act 1906 (6 Edw. 7. c. 38))

=== Sources ===
- Alexander, William (1841). "Acta Parliamentorum Regis Caroli Secundi". An Abridgement of the Acts of the Parliaments of Scotland. Edinburgh: Adam and Charles Black. pp. A62 – A63 – via Google Books.
- Alexander, William (1841). "Acta Parliamentorum Regis Caroli Secundi". An Abridgement of the Acts of the Parliaments of Scotland. Edinburgh: Adam and Charles Black. pp. A62 – A63 – via Google Books.
- Chronological Table of the Statutes. London: Her Majesty's Stationery Office. 1972. p. 1355 – via Google Books.
- "Index of Statutes: Index of Statutes: Charles II (1649-1685)". Records of the Parliaments of Scotland to 1707. University of St Andrews.

== See also ==
- List of legislation in the United Kingdom
- Records of the Parliaments of Scotland
