= List of acts of the Parliament of Scotland from 1573 =

This is a list of acts of the Parliament of Scotland for the year 1573.

It lists acts of Parliament of the old Parliament of Scotland, that was merged with the old Parliament of England to form the Parliament of Great Britain, by the Union with England Act 1707 (c. 7).

For other years, see list of acts of the Parliament of Scotland. For the period after 1707, see list of acts of the Parliament of Great Britain.

== 1573 ==
The 4th parliament of James VI.

Short title, or popular name	Citation	Royal assent
Long title
Divorce for Desertion Act 1573 (repealed)	1573 c. 1 (Note: This is the citation in the Record Edition.); 1573 c. 55 (Note: This is the citation in the Duodecimal Edition.)	30 April 1573
Anent thame that divertis fra utheris being joynit of befoir in launchfull marriage. (Repealed by Divorce (Scotland) Act 1938 (1 & 2 Geo. 6. c. 50))
Wine Act 1573 (repealed)	1573 c. 2 — (Note: This act is not listed in the Duodecimal Edition.)	30 April 1573
Anent the hamebringing of wyne and prices thairof. (Repealed by Statute Law Revision (Scotland) Act 1906 (6 Edw. 7. c. 38))
Salt Act 1573 (repealed)	1573 c. 3; 1573 c. 56	30 April 1573
Anent the transporting of salt furth of this realme. (Repealed by Statute Law Revision (Scotland) Act 1906 (6 Edw. 7. c. 38))
Measures Act 1573 (repealed)	1573 c. 4; 1573 c. 57	30 April 1573
Anent the measure of salmond and hering barrellis. (Repealed by Statute Law Revision (Scotland) Act 1906 (6 Edw. 7. c. 38))
Edinburgh Act 1573 (repealed)	1573 c. 5; 1573 c. 58	30 April 1573
Anent the annuellis to be payit of brunt and demolischit housis and tenementis within the burgh of Edinburgh Cannogait and utheris suburbes thairabout the tyme of thir lait troublis. (Repealed by Statute Law Revision (Scotland) Act 1906 (6 Edw. 7. c. 38))
Export Prohibitions Act 1573 (repealed)	1573 c. 6; 1573 c. 59	30 April 1573
Anent the transporting of forbiddin gudis out of this realme. (Repealed by Statute Law Revision (Scotland) Act 1906 (6 Edw. 7. c. 38))
Sea Fishing Act 1573 (repealed)	1573 c. 7; 1573 c. 60	30 April 1573
Anent the slauchter of hering and quhyte fische and using of the samin thaireafter. (Repealed by Statute Law Revision (Scotland) Act 1906 (6 Edw. 7. c. 38))

=== Sources ===
- Alexander, William (1841). "Acta Parliamentorum Regis Jacobi Sexti". An Abridgement of the Acts of the Parliaments of Scotland. Edinburgh: Adam and Charles Black. p. A22 – via Google Books.
- Alexander, William (1841). "Acta Parliamentorum Regis Jacobi Sexti". An Abridgement of the Acts of the Parliaments of Scotland. Edinburgh: Adam and Charles Black. p. A22 – via Google Books.
- Chronological Table of the Statutes. London: Her Majesty's Stationery Office. 1972. p. 1335 – via Google Books.
- "Index of Statutes: James VI (1567-1625)". Records of the Parliaments of Scotland to 1707. University of St Andrews.

== See also ==
- List of legislation in the United Kingdom
- Records of the Parliaments of Scotland
