= List of acts of the Parliament of Scotland from 1452 =

This is a list of acts of the Parliament of Scotland for the year 1452.

It lists acts of Parliament of the old Parliament of Scotland, that was merged with the old Parliament of England to form the Parliament of Great Britain, by the Union with England Act 1707 (c. 7).

For other years, see list of acts of the Parliament of Scotland. For the period after 1707, see list of acts of the Parliament of Great Britain.

== 1452 ==
The 9th parliament of James II.

Short title, or popular name	Citation	Royal assent
Long title
English Money Act 1452 (repealed)	1452 c. 1 (Note: This is the citation in the Record Edition.) — (Note: This act is not listed in the Duodecimal Edition.)	26 August 1459
Of the course of the Inglis penny. Of the course of the English penny. (Repealed by Statute Law Revision (Scotland) Act 1906 (6 Edw. 7. c. 38))
Meeting of Parliament Act 1452 (repealed)	1452 c. 2 —	26 August 1459
A parliament ordanyt to be haldin at Edinburghe the xxviii day of Marche next to cum. A parliament is ordained to be held at Edinburgh on the 28th day of March next to come. (Repealed by Statute Law Revision (Scotland) Act 1906 (6 Edw. 7. c. 38))
Corn Act 1452 (repealed)	1452 c. 3; 1452 c. 38 (Note: This is the citation in the Duodecimal Edition.)	26 August 1459
Anent the threschin out of corne. About the threshing out of corn. (Repealed by Statute Law Revision (Scotland) Act 1906 (6 Edw. 7. c. 38))
Food Act 1452 (repealed)	1452 c. 4; 1452 c. 39	26 August 1459
Of halding wittail in gyrnall. Of holding victuals in general. (Repealed by Statute Law Revision (Scotland) Act 1906 (6 Edw. 7. c. 38))
Food (No. 2) Act 1452 (repealed)	1452 c. 5; 1452 c. 40	26 August 1459
Of bying and halding wittail to a derthe. Of buying and holding victuals to a dearth. (Repealed by Statute Law Revision (Scotland) Act 1906 (6 Edw. 7. c. 38))

=== Sources ===
- Alexander, William (1841). "Acta Parliamentorum Regis Jacobi Secundi". An Abridgement of the Acts of the Parliaments of Scotland. Edinburgh: Adam and Charles Black. p. 441 – via Google Books.
- Alexander, William (1841). "Acta Parliamentorum Regis Jacobi Secundi". An Abridgement of the Acts of the Parliaments of Scotland. Edinburgh: Adam and Charles Black. p. 441 – via Google Books.
- Chronological Table of the Statutes. London: Her Majesty's Stationery Office. 1972. p. 1318 – via Google Books.
- "Index of Statutes: James II (1437-1460)". Records of the Parliaments of Scotland to 1707. University of St Andrews.

== See also ==
- List of legislation in the United Kingdom
- Records of the Parliaments of Scotland
