= List of acts of the Parliament of Scotland from 1457 =

This is a list of acts of the Parliament of Scotland for the year 1457.

It lists acts of Parliament of the old Parliament of Scotland, that was merged with the old Parliament of England to form the Parliament of Great Britain, by the Union with England Act 1707 (c. 7).

For other years, see list of acts of the Parliament of Scotland. For the period after 1707, see list of acts of the Parliament of Great Britain.

== 1457 ==
The 14th parliament of James II.

Short title, or popular name	Citation	Royal assent
Long title
Lords of the Session Act 1457 (repealed)	1457 c. 1 (Note: This is the citation in the Record Edition.) — (Note: This act is not listed in the Duodecimal Edition.)	6 March 1458
Of the lordis of the sessione. Of the lords of the session. (Repealed by Statute Law Revision (Scotland) Act 1906 (6 Edw. 7. c. 38))
Jurisdiction of the Lords of Session Act 1457 (repealed)	1457 c. 2; 1457 c. 61 (Note: This is the citation in the Duodecimal Edition.)	6 March 1458
Of the causis that the lordis of the sessione sall knaw apone. Of the causes that the lords of the session shall decide upon. (Repealed by Statute Law Revision (Scotland) Act 1906 (6 Edw. 7. c. 38))
Procedure before Lords of the Session Act 1457 (repealed)	1457 c. 3; 1457 c. 62	6 March 1458
Of the manere at the cause salbe brocht befor the lordis of the sessione. Of the manner of causes that shall be brought before the lords of the session. (Repealed by Statute Law Revision (Scotland) Act 1906 (6 Edw. 7. c. 38))
Expenses of the Lords of the Session Act 1457 (repealed)	1457 c. 4; 1457 c. 63	6 March 1458
Tuiching the expens of the lordis of the sessione. Touching the expenses of the lords of the session. (Repealed by Statute Law Revision (Scotland) Act 1906 (6 Edw. 7. c. 38))
Successors of the Lords of the Session Act 1457 (repealed)	1457 c. 5 —	6 March 1458
Of uthir lordis of the sessione to be namit the said sessionis endit. Of other lords of the session to be named when the said sessions end. (Repealed by Statute Law Revision (Scotland) Act 1906 (6 Edw. 7. c. 38))
Wapinschaws Act 1457 (repealed)	1457 c. 6; 1457 c. 64	6 March 1458
Of wapinschawingis. Of wapinschaws. (Repealed by Statute Law Revision (Scotland) Act 1906 (6 Edw. 7. c. 38))
Coinage Act 1457 (repealed)	1457 c. 7 —	6 March 1458
Of the mone. Of the money. (Repealed by Statute Law Revision (Scotland) Act 1906 (6 Edw. 7. c. 38))
Gold and Silver Work Act 1457 (repealed)	1457 c. 8; 1457 c. 65	6 March 1458
Anent the reformacione of golde and silver wrocht be goldsmythis. About the reform of gold and silver wrought by goldsmiths. (Repealed by Statute Law Revision (Scotland) Act 1906 (6 Edw. 7. c. 38))
Dyers Act 1457 (repealed)	1457 c. 9; 1457 c. 66	6 March 1458
Of litstaris. Of dyers. (Repealed by Statute Law Revision (Scotland) Act 1906 (6 Edw. 7. c. 38))
Shipping Act 1457 (repealed)	1457 c. 10; 1457 c. 67	6 March 1458
Anent the estat of merchandice and restriccione of the multitude of failaris. About the estate of merchandise and restriction of the multitude of sailors. (Repealed by Statute Law Revision (Scotland) Act 1906 (6 Edw. 7. c. 38))
Sumptuary Act 1457 (repealed)	1457 c. 11; 1457 c. 68	6 March 1458
Of the arraymentis for Parliamentis. Of the arrayments for Parliaments. (Repealed by Statute Law Revision (Scotland) Act 1906 (6 Edw. 7. c. 38))
Hospitals Act 1457 (repealed)	1457 c. 12; 1457 c. 69	6 March 1458
Anentis the reformacione of hospitalys. About the reformation of hospitals. (Repealed by Statute Law Revision (Scotland) Act 1906 (6 Edw. 7. c. 38))
Sumptuary Act 1457 (repealed)	1457 c. 13; 1457 c. 70	6 March 1458
Anent restriccione of sumptuose clething. About restrictions of sumptuous clothing. (Repealed by Statute Law Revision (Scotland) Act 1906 (6 Edw. 7. c. 38))
Circuit Courts Act 1457 (repealed)	1457 c. 14; 1457 c. 70	6 March 1458
Of Justice ayris. Of Justice ayres. (Repealed by Statute Law Revision (Scotland) Act 1906 (6 Edw. 7. c. 38))
Feuing Act 1457 (repealed)	1457 c. 15; 1457 c. 71	6 March 1458
Anent the setting of landis in feuferme. About the setting of lands in feu-farm. (Repealed by Statute Law Revision (Scotland) Act 1906 (6 Edw. 7. c. 38))
Regalities Act 1457 (repealed)	1457 c. 16; 1457 c. 72	6 March 1458
Of regaliteis. Of regalities. (Repealed by Statute Law Revision (Scotland) Act 1906 (6 Edw. 7. c. 38))
Beggars Act 1457 (repealed)	1457 c. 17 —	6 March 1458
Of beggaris. Of beggars. (Repealed by Statute Law Revision (Scotland) Act 1906 (6 Edw. 7. c. 38))
Measures Act 1457 (repealed)	1457 c. 18; 1457 c. 73	6 March 1458
Anentis mettis and mesuris. About mettis and measures. (Repealed by Statute Law Revision (Scotland) Act 1906 (6 Edw. 7. c. 38))
Remissions Act 1457 (repealed)	1457 c. 19; 1457 c. 74	6 March 1458
Anentis the contentacione of parteis plenyeande of personis quhilkis has remissionis of the king. About the pleading of parties of persons who have remission from the king. (Repealed by Statute Law Revision (Scotland) Act 1906 (6 Edw. 7. c. 38))
Chamberlain Aires Act 1457 (repealed)	1457 c. 20 —	6 March 1458
Anentis the reformacione of chaumerlane ayris. About the reformation of chamberlain aires. (Repealed by Statute Law Revision (Scotland) Act 1906 (6 Edw. 7. c. 38))
Members of Parliament Act 1457 (repealed)	1457 c. 21; 1457 c. 75	6 March 1458
Of frehaldaris cuming to Parliament or general consale. Of freeholders coming to Parliament or general council. (Repealed by Statute Law Revision (Scotland) Act 1906 (6 Edw. 7. c. 38))
Constables' Fees Act 1457 (repealed)	1457 c. 22 —	6 March 1458
Of the use of taking distressis for constable feis. Of the use of taking distress for constables' fees. (Repealed by Statute Law Revision (Scotland) Act 1906 (6 Edw. 7. c. 38))
Officers of Law Act 1457 (repealed)	1457 c. 23; 1457 c. 76	6 March 1458
The punicione of negligent officiaris. The punishment of negligent officers. (Repealed by Statute Law Revision (Scotland) Act 1906 (6 Edw. 7. c. 38))
Leagues in Burghs Act 1457 (repealed)	1457 c. 24; 1457 c. 77	6 March 1458
Of bandis and ligis within burrowis and of manrent. Of bonds or lieges within the burghs and of manrent. (Repealed by Statute Law Revision (Scotland) Act 1906 (6 Edw. 7. c. 38))
Squatters Act 1457 (repealed)	1457 c. 25; 1457 c. 78	6 March 1458
Anent maisterful men that schapis thame to occupy maisterfully lordis landis. About masterful men that fashion to occupy masterfully lords' lands. (Repealed by Statute Law Revision (Scotland) Act 1906 (6 Edw. 7. c. 38))
Sorners and Beggars Act 1457 (repealed)	1457 c. 26; 1457 c. 79	6 March 1458
Of Inquisicione of Sornaris bardis maisterfull beggaris and fenyeit fulys. Of Inquisition of Sorners, bards, masterful beggars and fained fools. (Repealed by Statute Law Revision (Scotland) Act 1906 (6 Edw. 7. c. 38))
Woods, Hedges and Broom Act 1457 (repealed)	1457 c. 27; 1457 c. 80	6 March 1458
Anent plantacione of woddis and heggis and sawing of broum. About the planting of woods and hedges, and sowing of broom. (Repealed by Statute Law Revision (Scotland) Act 1906 (6 Edw. 7. c. 38))
Agriculture Act 1457 (repealed)	1457 c. 28; 1457 c. 81	6 March 1458
Anent the sawing of quheit peys and benys. About the sowing of wheat, peas and beans. (Repealed by Statute Law Revision (Scotland) Act 1906 (6 Edw. 7. c. 38))
Attendance at Court Act 1457 (repealed)	1457 c. 29; 1457 c. 82	6 March 1458
That all personis sall cum to courtis in sobyr and quiet maner. That all persons shall come to court in sober and quiet manner. (Repealed by Statute Law Revision (Scotland) Act 1906 (6 Edw. 7. c. 38))
Fencing Act 1457 (repealed)	1457 c. 30; 1457 c. 83	6 March 1458
Anent yardis and heggis of dry staikis. About yards and hedges of dry stakes. (Repealed by Statute Law Revision (Scotland) Act 1906 (6 Edw. 7. c. 38))
Wild Birds Act 1457 (repealed)	1457 c. 31; 1457 c. 84	6 March 1458
Anent the keping of wylde foulys that ganis to eit for the sustentacione of man. About the keeping of wildfowl that are grown to eat for the sustenance of man. (Repealed by Statute Law Revision (Scotland) Act 1906 (6 Edw. 7. c. 38))
Rooks, Crows, etc. Act 1457 (repealed)	1457 c. 32; 1457 c. 84	6 March 1458
Anent the distroying of rukis crawys and uthir foulys of reif. About the destruction of rooks, crows, and other birds of prey. (Repealed by Statute Law Revision (Scotland) Act 1906 (6 Edw. 7. c. 38))
Salmon Act 1457 (repealed)	1457 c. 33; 1457 c. 85	6 March 1458
Anent the slauchter of rede fische. About the killing of red fish. (Repealed by Statute Law Revision (Scotland) Act 1906 (6 Edw. 7. c. 38))
Salmon (No. 2) Act 1457 (repealed)	1457 c. 34; 1457 c. 86	6 March 1458
Anent ingynis that lat the smoltis to pas to the se. About engines that prevent the smoults passing to the sea. (Repealed by Statute Law Revision (Scotland) Act 1906 (6 Edw. 7. c. 38))
Wolves Act 1457 (repealed)	1457 c. 35; 1457 c. 87	6 March 1458
For the destruccione of wolfis. For the destruction of wolves. (Repealed by Statute Law Revision (Scotland) Act 1906 (6 Edw. 7. c. 38))
Hares and Rabbits Act 1457 (repealed)	1457 c. 36; 1457 c. 88	6 March 1458
Anentis the slaaris of haris and destruccione of cunnyngis. About the slaying of hares and destruction of rabbits. (Repealed by Statute Law Revision (Scotland) Act 1906 (6 Edw. 7. c. 38))
Leasing Makers Act 1457 (repealed)	1457 c. 37; 1457 c. 88	6 March 1458
The statute anent lesyng makaris confirmyt and apprevyt. That statute regarding lying is confirmed and approved. (Repealed by Statute Law Revision (Scotland) Act 1906 (6 Edw. 7. c. 38))
Muirburn Act 1457 (repealed)	1457 c. 38 —	6 March 1458
The statute of murbyrne apprevyt and ordanit to be kepit. The statute of muirburn is approved and ordained to be kept. (Repealed by Statute Law Revision (Scotland) Act 1906 (6 Edw. 7. c. 38))
Proclamation of Acts of Parliament Act 1457 (repealed)	1457 c. 39; 1457 c. 89	6 March 1458
Anent proclamacione of the actis and ordinancis abone writtyn in schyris and burrowis. About the proclamation of the acts and ordinances written about in shires and burghs. (Repealed by Statute Law Revision (Scotland) Act 1906 (6 Edw. 7. c. 38))
Execution of Acts of Parliament Act 1457 (repealed)	1457 c. 40; 1457 c. 89	6 March 1458
Exhortacione be the thre estatis to our soverane lord tuiching the diligent execucione of thir actis and statutis. Exhortation by the three estates to our sovereign lord touching the diligent execution of their acts and statutes. (Repealed by Statute Law Revision (Scotland) Act 1906 (6 Edw. 7. c. 38))

=== Sources ===
- Alexander, William (1841). "Acta Parliamentorum Regis Jacobi Secundi". An Abridgement of the Acts of the Parliaments of Scotland. Edinburgh: Adam and Charles Black. pp. 441–442 – via Google Books.
- Alexander, William (1841). "Acta Parliamentorum Regis Jacobi Secundi". An Abridgement of the Acts of the Parliaments of Scotland. Edinburgh: Adam and Charles Black. pp. 441–442 – via Google Books.
- Chronological Table of the Statutes. London: Her Majesty's Stationery Office. 1972. p. 1319 – via Google Books.
- "Index of Statutes: James II (1437-1460)". Records of the Parliaments of Scotland to 1707. University of St Andrews.

== See also ==
- List of legislation in the United Kingdom
- Records of the Parliaments of Scotland
