= List of acts of the Parliament of Scotland from 1425 =

This is a list of acts of the Parliament of Scotland for the year 1425.

It lists acts of Parliament of the old Parliament of Scotland, that was merged with the old Parliament of England to form the Parliament of Great Britain, by the Union with England Act 1707 (c. 7).

For other years, see list of acts of the Parliament of Scotland. For the period after 1707, see list of acts of the Parliament of Great Britain.

== 1425 ==
The 3rd parliament of James I, held at Perth on 11 March 1426.

Short title, or popular name	Citation	Royal assent
Long title
Church Act 1425 (repealed)	1425 c. 1 (Note: This is the citation in the Record Edition.) — (Note: This act is not listed in the Duodecimal Edition.)	11 March 1426
Of the fredom of the haly kirk. Of the freedom of the holy church. (Repealed by Statute Law Revision (Scotland) Act 1906 (6 Edw. 7. c. 38))
Armour to be Imported Act 1426 (repealed)	1425 c. 2; 1425 c. 47 (Note: This is the citation in the Duodecimal Edition.)	11 March 1426
Anent harnes and armouris to be brocht hame be merchandis. Regarding harnesses and armour to be brought home by merchants. (Repealed by Statute Law Revision (Scotland) Act 1906 (6 Edw. 7. c. 38))
Law of the Land Act 1425 or the Law of the Land Act 1426 (repealed)	1425 c. 3; 1425 c. 48	11 March 1426
Under quhat lawis the kingis liegis salbe governyt. Under what laws the king's subjects shall be governed. (Repealed by the Statute Law Revision (Scotland) Act 1964 (c. 80))
Registration of King's Letters Act 1426 (repealed)	1425 c. 4 —	11 March 1426
Anent the registracione of lotteris of newe infeftment, confirmacion, &c. Regarding the registration of letters of new infeftment, confirmation, etc. (Repealed by Statute Law Revision (Scotland) Act 1906 (6 Edw. 7. c. 38))
Export of Coin Act 1425 (repealed)	1425 c. 5; 1425 c. 49	11 March 1426
Of the halding of the mone within the realme. Of the holding of money within the realm. (Repealed by Statute Law Revision (Scotland) Act 1906 (6 Edw. 7. c. 38))
Jurymen Act 1425 (repealed)	1425 c. 6; 1425 c. 50	11 March 1426
Of thame that may not gang apon assise. Of those that do not go to assize. (Repealed by Statute Law Revision (Scotland) Act 1906 (6 Edw. 7. c. 38))
Forethought Felony Act 1425 (repealed)	1425 c. 7; 1425 c. 51	11 March 1426
Of forthocht felony. Of forethought felony. (Repealed by Statute Law Revision (Scotland) Act 1906 (6 Edw. 7. c. 38))
Attendance in Parliament Act 1425 or the Attendance in Parliament Act 1426 (repealed)	1425 c. 8; 1425 c. 52	11 March 1426
Of presens in the Parliament. Of attendance in the Parliament. (Repealed by Statute Law Revision (Scotland) Act 1906 (6 Edw. 7. c. 38))
Attorneys Act 1425 (repealed)	1425 c. 9; 1425 c. 53	11 March 1426
Of attournayis in the Justice ayr. Of attorneys in the Justice ayre. (Repealed by Statute Law Revision (Scotland) Act 1906 (6 Edw. 7. c. 38))
Statute Law Revision Act 1425 or the Statute Law Revision Act 1426 (repealed)	1425 c. 10; 1425 cc. 54 and 55	11 March 1426
Of personis to be chosyn to examyn and mend the bukis of law of this realme. Of persons chosen to examine and amend the books of law of this realm. (Repealed by Statute Law Revision (Scotland) Act 1906 (6 Edw. 7. c. 38))
Travellers Act 1425 (repealed)	1425 c. 11; 1425 c. 56	11 March 1426
Anent hostelaris in boroustounis and throuchfaris. Regarding hostelries in burghs and throughfares. (Repealed by Statute Law Revision (Scotland) Act 1906 (6 Edw. 7. c. 38))
Prayers for Royal Family Act 1425 (repealed)	1425 c. 12 —	11 March 1426
Of orisones to be maid for the king the queyn and thare childer. Of prayers to be made for the king, the queen, and their children. (Repealed by Statute Law Revision (Scotland) Act 1906 (6 Edw. 7. c. 38))
Measures Act 1425 (repealed)	1425 c. 13; 1425 c. 59	11 March 1426
Anent mesuris. About measures. (Repealed by Statute Law Revision (Scotland) Act 1906 (6 Edw. 7. c. 38))
Weights Act 1425 (repealed)	1425 c. 14 —	11 March 1426
Anent wechtis. About weights. (Repealed by Statute Law Revision (Scotland) Act 1906 (6 Edw. 7. c. 38))
Water Measures Act 1425 (repealed)	1425 c. 15; 1425 c. 57	11 March 1426
Of watter mettis. Of water measures. (Repealed by Statute Law Revision (Scotland) Act 1906 (6 Edw. 7. c. 38))
Ferries Act 1425 (repealed)	1425 c. 16; 1425 c. 58	11 March 1426
Anent batemen and feriaris. About boatmen and ferries. (Repealed by Statute Law Revision (Scotland) Act 1906 (6 Edw. 7. c. 38))
Wapinschaws Act 1425 (repealed)	1425 c. 17; 1425 c. 60	11 March 1426
Of wapinschawingis. Of wapinschaws. (Repealed by Statute Law Revision (Scotland) Act 1906 (6 Edw. 7. c. 38))
Trade with Ireland Act 1425 (repealed)	1425 c. 18; 1425 cc. 61 to 64	11 March 1426
Ordinance anent the passage betuix Scotlande and Irlande. Ordinance regarding the trade between Scotland and Ireland. (Repealed by Statute Law Revision (Scotland) Act 1906 (6 Edw. 7. c. 38))
Lords of the Session Act 1425 or the Lords of the Session Act 1426 or the Lords of Session Act 1425 (repealed)	1425 c. 19; 1425 c. 65	11 March 1426
Of the Sessionis to be haldin. Of the Sessions to be held. (Repealed by Statute Law Revision (Scotland) Act 1906 (6 Edw. 7. c. 38))
Poor Act 1425 or the Poor Act 1426 (repealed)	1425 c. 20; 1425 c. 66	11 March 1426
Anent inquisicion to be maid of ydil men that has nocht of thare awin to leif upon. Regarding inquiry to be made of idle men that have not enough of their own to live upon. (Repealed by Statute Law Revision (Scotland) Act 1906 (6 Edw. 7. c. 38))
Proclamation of Acts of Parliament Act 1425 or the Proclamation of Acts of Parliament Act 1426 (repealed)	1425 c. 21; 1425 c. 67	11 March 1426
Of the registracione and proclamacione of the actis of parliament. Of the registration and proclamation of the acts of parliament. (Repealed by Statute Law Revision (Scotland) Act 1906 (6 Edw. 7. c. 38))
Weights and Measures Act 1425 (repealed)	1425 c. 22; 1426 cc. 68 to 70	11 March 1426
Assisa de ponderibus et mensuris. Assize of weights and measures. (Repealed by Statute Law Revision (Scotland) Act 1906 (6 Edw. 7. c. 38))
Fire in Towns Act 1425 or the Fire in Towns Act 1426 (repealed)	1425 c. 23; 1426 cc. 71 to 75	11 March 1426
Anentis fyre in townis. About fire in towns. (Repealed by Statute Law Revision (Scotland) Act 1906 (6 Edw. 7. c. 38))

=== Sources ===
- Alexander, William (1841). "Acta Parliamentorum Regis Jacobi Primi". An Abridgement of the Acts of the Parliaments of Scotland. Edinburgh: Adam and Charles Black. pp. 438–439 – via Google Books.
- Alexander, William (1841). "Acta Parliamentorum Regis Jacobi Primi". An Abridgement of the Acts of the Parliaments of Scotland. Edinburgh: Adam and Charles Black. pp. 438–439 – via Google Books.
- Chronological Table of the Statutes. London: Her Majesty's Stationery Office. 1972. p. 1315 – via Google Books.
- "Index of Statutes: James I (1406-1437)". Records of the Parliaments of Scotland to 1707. University of St Andrews.

== See also ==
- List of legislation in the United Kingdom
- Records of the Parliaments of Scotland
