= List of acts of the Parliament of Scotland from 1572 =

This is a list of acts of the Parliament of Scotland for the year 1572.

It lists acts of Parliament of the old Parliament of Scotland, that was merged with the old Parliament of England to form the Parliament of Great Britain, by the Union with England Act 1707 (c. 7).

For other years, see list of acts of the Parliament of Scotland. For the period after 1707, see list of acts of the Parliament of Great Britain.

== 1572 ==
The 3rd parliament of James VI, held in Edinburgh from 26 January 1572.

Short title, or popular name	Citation	Royal assent
Long title
Regent Act 1572 (repealed)	1572 c. 1 (Note: This is the citation in the Record Edition.); 1572 c. 44 (Note: This is the citation in the Duodecimal Edition.)	26 January 1572
Anent the approbatioun and confirmatioun of the regiment. (Repealed by Statute Law Revision (Scotland) Act 1906 (6 Edw. 7. c. 38))
Church Act 1572 (repealed)	1572 c. 2; 1572 c. 45	26 January 1572
Anent the trew and haly kirk. (Repealed by Statute Law Revision (Scotland) Act 1906 (6 Edw. 7. c. 38))
Church Property Act 1572 (repealed)	1572 c. 3; 1572 c. 46	26 January 1572
That the adversareis of Christis evangell sall not injoy the patrimonie of the kirk. (Repealed by Statute Law Revision (Scotland) Act 1906 (6 Edw. 7. c. 38))
Pardon to Rebels Act 1572 (repealed)	1572 c. 4; 1572 c. 47	26 January 1572
Anent the disobedientis quhilkis salbe ressavit to our Soverane lordis mercy and pardoun. (Repealed by Statute Law Revision (Scotland) Act 1906 (6 Edw. 7. c. 38))
Manses and Glebes Act 1572 (repealed)	1572 c. 5; 1572 c. 48	26 January 1572
The explanatioun of the act maid anent mansis and glebis. (Repealed by Statute Law Revision (Scotland) Act 1964 (c. 80))
Regent (No. 2) Act 1572 (repealed)	1572 c. 6 — (Note: This act is not listed in the Duodecimal Edition.)	26 January 1572
Anent the establisching of the regiment in case at Goddis plesure that charge yit vaik during the kingis majesteis minoritie. (Repealed by Statute Law Revision (Scotland) Act 1906 (6 Edw. 7. c. 38))
Crown Jewels, etc. Act 1572 (repealed)	1572 c. 7 —	26 January 1572
Tuiching the recovering and collecting of the kingis majesties jowellis and movables. (Repealed by Statute Law Revision (Scotland) Act 1906 (6 Edw. 7. c. 38))
Hornings Act 1572 (repealed)	1572 c. 8; 1572 c. 49	26 January 1572
Anent the possessouris of benefices pensiounis portiounis and utheris spirituall rentis lyand at the horne attour the space of yeir and day. (Repealed by Statute Law Revision (Scotland) Act 1906 (6 Edw. 7. c. 38))
Regent's Acts Act 1572 (repealed)	1572 c. 9; 1572 c. 50	26 January 1572
Approbatioun of the actis and procedingis done in name and be authoritie of our Soverane lord and of the invaliditie of all thingis attemptit in name or be culour of ony uther authoritie sen his hienes coronatioun. (Repealed by Statute Law Revision (Scotland) Act 1906 (6 Edw. 7. c. 38))
Not public and general	1572 c. 10 —	26 January 1572
Anent the erle Ergyle and certane utheris noblemen.
Edinburgh Act 1572 (repealed)	1572 c. 11 —	26 January 1572
Anent the inhabitantis of Edinburgh. Regarding the inhabitants of Edinburgh. (Repealed by Statute Law Revision (Scotland) Act 1906 (6 Edw. 7. c. 38))
Bulls Fraudulently Obtained Act 1572 (repealed)	1572 c. 12; 1572 c. 51	26 January 1572
Anent purchessing of the Papis bullis or giftis of the quene our Soverane lordis mother. (Repealed by Statute Law Revision (Scotland) Act 1906 (6 Edw. 7. c. 38))
Benefices Act 1572 (repealed)	1572 c. 13; 1572 c. 52	26 January 1572
Ane approbatioun of the act maid anent the dispositioun of benefices to the ministeris of Christis Evangell. (Repealed by Statute Law Revision (Scotland) Act 1906 (6 Edw. 7. c. 38))
Excommunication Act 1572 (repealed)	1572 c. 14; 1572 c. 53	26 January 1572
Anent thame that sustenis the proces of excommunicatioun. (Repealed by Statute Law Revision (Scotland) Act 1906 (6 Edw. 7. c. 38))
Parish Churches Act 1572 (repealed)	1572 c. 15; 1572 c. 54	26 January 1572
Anent the reparatioun of the paroche kirkis. (Repealed by Statute Law Revision (Scotland) Act 1964 (c. 80))

=== Sources ===
- Alexander, William (1841). "Acta Parliamentorum Regis Jacobi Sexti". An Abridgement of the Acts of the Parliaments of Scotland. Edinburgh: Adam and Charles Black. p. A22 – via Google Books.
- Alexander, William (1841). "Acta Parliamentorum Regis Jacobi Sexti". An Abridgement of the Acts of the Parliaments of Scotland. Edinburgh: Adam and Charles Black. p. A22 – via Google Books.
- Chronological Table of the Statutes. London: Her Majesty's Stationery Office. 1972. p. 1335 – via Google Books.
- "Index of Statutes: James VI (1567-1625)". Records of the Parliaments of Scotland to 1707. University of St Andrews.

== See also ==
- List of legislation in the United Kingdom
- Records of the Parliaments of Scotland
