= List of acts of the Parliament of Scotland from 1526 =

This is a list of acts of the Parliament of Scotland for the year 1526.

It lists acts of Parliament of the old Parliament of Scotland, that was merged with the old Parliament of England to form the Parliament of Great Britain, by the Union with England Act 1707 (c. 7).

For other years, see list of acts of the Parliament of Scotland. For the period after 1707, see list of acts of the Parliament of Great Britain.

== 1526 ==
=== January ===
A parliament of James V, held in Edinburgh from 12 June 1526.

Record ed: 12 January

Short title, or popular name	Citation	Royal assent
Long title
Church Act 1526 (repealed)	January 1526 c. 1 (Note: This is the citation in the Record Edition.) — (Note: This act is not listed in the Duodecimal Edition.)	14 June 1526
Of halikirk. Of the holy church. (Repealed by Statute Law Revision (Scotland) Act 1906 (6 Edw. 7. c. 38))
King's Majority Act 1526 (repealed)	January 1526 c. 2 —	14 June 1526
Declaracioun that the Kingis auctoritie riale is in his awn handis. Declaration that the King's royal authority is in his own hands. (Repealed by Statute Law Revision (Scotland) Act 1906 (6 Edw. 7. c. 38))
Not public and general	January 1526 c. 3 —	14 June 1526
Act in favour of Schir Jhone Quhyte. Act in favour of Sir John White.
Abbot of Melrose Act 1526 Not public and general	January 1526 c. 4 —	14 June 1526
Anent the appointment of the Abbot of Melros. Regarding the appointment of the Abbot of Melrose.
Abbot of Coupar Angus Act 1526 Not public and general	January 1526 c. 5 —	14 June 1526
Anent the appointment of the Abbot of Couper. Regarding the appointment of the Abbot of Coupar.
Privy Council Act 1526 (repealed)	January 1526 c. 6 —)	21 June 1526
The lordis to be of the Kingis Counsale and of his Secret Counsale. The lords to be of the King's Council and of his Secret Council. (Repealed by Statute Law Revision (Scotland) Act 1906 (6 Edw. 7. c. 38))
King's Acts in Minority Act 1526 (repealed)	January 1526 c. 7 —)	21 June 1526
Ratificatioun of all giftis respectis remissiouns and all uthir actis maid be his hienes sen his age of xiiij yeris. Ratification of all gifts, respites, remissions and all other acts made by his highness since his age of 14 years. (Repealed by Statute Law Revision (Scotland) Act 1906 (6 Edw. 7. c. 38))
Not public and general	January 1526 c. 8 —	21 June 1526
Anent ane summondis of tresoun to be rasit aganis the Erle of Eglintoun (Note: Hugh Montgomerie, 1st Earl of Eglinton.) and utheris. Regarding the summonses of treason to be raised against the Earl of Eglinton and others.
King's Person Act 1526 (repealed)	January 1526 c. 9 —)	21 June 1526
Anent the gyding of the Kingis persone. Regarding the guiding of the King's person. (Repealed by Statute Law Revision (Scotland) Act 1906 (6 Edw. 7. c. 38))
Crown Property Act 1526 (repealed)	January 1526 c. 10 —)	21 June 1526
Revocatioun of all giftis &c. of the Kingis propirtie sen the deceis of his fader. Revocation of all gifts, etc., of the King's property since the death of his father. (Repealed by Statute Law Revision (Scotland) Act 1906 (6 Edw. 7. c. 38))
Money and Bullion Act 1526 (repealed)	January 1526 c. 11 —)	21 June 1526
Anent the cours of money bringing hame of bulyeoun and the having furth the gold of the mynd. Regarding the circulation of money, the importation of bullion, and the taking of the gold out of the mines. (Repealed by Statute Law Revision (Scotland) Act 1906 (6 Edw. 7. c. 38))
King's Privileges from Pope Act 1526 (repealed)	January 1526 c. 12 —)	21 June 1526
Anent the auld actis aganis thame that dois contrar the Kingis privilege grantit to his predecessouris and successouris be the sege of Rome. Regarding the old acts against those who do contrary to the King's privilege, granted to his predecessors and successors by the see of Rome. (Repealed by Statute Law Revision (Scotland) Act 1906 (6 Edw. 7. c. 38))
King's Marriage Act 1526 (repealed)	January 1526 c. 13 —)	21 June 1526
Anent the mariage of our Soverane Lord. Regarding the marriage of our Sovereign Lord. (Repealed by Statute Law Revision (Scotland) Act 1906 (6 Edw. 7. c. 38))
Observance of Penal Statutes Act 1526 (repealed)	January 1526 c. 14 —)	21 June 1526
Anent the keping of the auld Actis of Parliament that ar penale. Regarding the keeping of the old Acts of Parliament that are penal. (Repealed by Statute Law Revision (Scotland) Act 1906 (6 Edw. 7. c. 38))
Estates of Minors Deceased Act 1526 (repealed)	January 1526 c. 15 —)	21 June 1526
Anent the gudis of persouns that deis within age. Regarding the goods of persons that die as minors. (Repealed by Statute Law Revision (Scotland) Act 1906 (6 Edw. 7. c. 38))
Legates Act 1526 (repealed)	January 1526 c. 16 —)	21 June 1526
Anent the ressaving of Legatis or Legatioun in this realm. Regarding the acceptance of legates or legations in this realm. (Repealed by Statute Law Revision (Scotland) Act 1906 (6 Edw. 7. c. 38))
Criminal Law Act 1526 (repealed)	January 1526 c. 17 —)	21 June 1526
Of remeid aganis thaim that under traist with dissait committis slauchteris &c. Of remedy against those who, under trust with deceit, commit murders, etc. (Repealed by Statute Law Revision (Scotland) Act 1906 (6 Edw. 7. c. 38))

=== November ===
The 3rd parliament of James V, held from 12 November 1526 until 23 November 1526.

Short title, or popular name	Citation	Royal assent
Long title
Church (No. 2) Act 1526 (repealed)	November 1526 c. 1 (Note: This is the citation in the Record Edition.) — (Note: This act is not listed in the Duodecimal Edition.)	16 November 1526
Of the fredome of haly kirk—with addicioun. Of the freedom of the holy church; with an addition. (Repealed by Statute Law Revision (Scotland) Act 1906 (6 Edw. 7. c. 38))
Bread Act 1526 (repealed)	November 1526 c. 2 —	23 November 1526
Anent the selling of breid within the toune of Edinburgh. Regarding the selling of bread within the town of Edinburgh. (Repealed by Statute Law Revision (Scotland) Act 1906 (6 Edw. 7. c. 38))
Flesh Act 1526 (repealed)	November 1526 c. 3 —	23 November 1526
Anent the selling of flesche in the toune of Edinburgh. Regarding the selling of meat in the town of Edinburgh. (Repealed by Statute Law Revision (Scotland) Act 1906 (6 Edw. 7. c. 38))
Tallow Act 1526 (repealed)	November 1526 c. 4 —	23 November 1526
Anent the carying of talloune furth of the realme. Regarding the carrying of tallow out of the realm. (Repealed by Statute Law Revision (Scotland) Act 1906 (6 Edw. 7. c. 38))
Coining Act 1526 (repealed)	November 1526 c. 5 —	23 November 1526
Anent fals money or conterfetis Regarding false money or counterfeits. (Repealed by Statute Law Revision (Scotland) Act 1906 (6 Edw. 7. c. 38))
Not public and general	November 1526 c. 6 —	23 November 1526
Anent execucioun of the dome aganis Henry Bardiner for piratry. Regarding execution of the doom against Henry Bardner for piracy.
Circuit Courts Act 1526 (repealed)	November 1526 c. 7 —	23 November 1526
Of Justice airis to be haldyn universalie. Of Justice ayres to be held universally. (Repealed by Statute Law Revision (Scotland) Act 1906 (6 Edw. 7. c. 38))
Maltmakers Act 1526 (repealed)	November 1526 c. 8 —	23 November 1526
Anent the oppressioune committit be the malt makaris of Leth. Regarding the oppression committed by the malt-makers of Leith. (Repealed by Statute Law Revision (Scotland) Act 1906 (6 Edw. 7. c. 38))
King's Privileges Act 1526 (repealed)	November 1526 c. 9 —	23 November 1526
Of conservatioune of the kingis previlege and how thai salbe punist that brekis the samyn. Of conservation of the king's privilege, and how they shall be punished that break the same. (Repealed by Statute Law Revision (Scotland) Act 1906 (6 Edw. 7. c. 38))
Fire Raising Act 1526 (repealed)	November 1526 c. 10; 1528 c. 8 (Note: This is the citation in the Duodecimal Edition.)	23 November 1526
Of slauchteris murthouris and byrningis. Of slaughters, murders and burnings. (Repealed by Statute Law Revision (Scotland) Act 1906 (6 Edw. 7. c. 38))

=== Sources ===
- Alexander, William (1841). "Acta Parliamentorum Regis Jacobi Quinti". An Abridgement of the Acts of the Parliaments of Scotland. Edinburgh: Adam and Charles Black. p. A15 – via Google Books.
- Alexander, William (1841). "Acta Parliamentorum Regis Jacobi Quinti". An Abridgement of the Acts of the Parliaments of Scotland. Edinburgh: Adam and Charles Black. p. A15 – via Google Books.
- Chronological Table of the Statutes. London: Her Majesty's Stationery Office. 1972. p. 1328 – via Google Books.
- "Index of Statutes: James V (1513-1542)". Records of the Parliaments of Scotland to 1707. University of St Andrews.

== See also ==
- List of legislation in the United Kingdom
- Records of the Parliaments of Scotland
