= List of acts of the Parliament of Scotland from 1487 =

This is a list of acts of the Parliament of Scotland for the year 1487.

It lists acts of Parliament of the old Parliament of Scotland, that was merged with the old Parliament of England to form the Parliament of Great Britain, by the Union with England Act 1707 (c. 7).

For other years, see list of acts of the Parliament of Scotland. For the period after 1707, see list of acts of the Parliament of Great Britain.

== 1487 ==
=== October ===
The 14th parliament of James III.

Short title, or popular name	Citation	Royal assent
Long title
Remissions Act 1487 (repealed)	October 1487 c. 1 (Note: This is the citation in the Record Edition.) — (Note: This act is not listed in the Duodecimal Edition.)	13 October 1487
Aganis the geving of remissiounis and respectis for vii yeiris nixt tocum. Against the giving of remissions and respites for the next 7 years. (Repealed by Statute Law Revision (Scotland) Act 1906 (6 Edw. 7. c. 38))
Circuit Courts Act 1487 (repealed)	October 1487 c. 2 —	13 October 1487
Of Justicez generale to be deput and of Justice airis to be haldin in all partis of the Realme. Of Justices-general to be deputed and of Justice ayres to be held in all parts of the Realm. (Repealed by Statute Law Revision (Scotland) Act 1906 (6 Edw. 7. c. 38))
Treason Act 1487 (repealed)	October 1487 c. 3; 1487 c. 98 (Note: This is the citation in the Duodecimal Edition.)	13 October 1487
Promitt be the estatis not to manteine or defend tratouris nor uthir trespassouris. Promise by the estates not the maintain or defend traitors nor other trespassers. (Repealed by Statute Law Revision (Scotland) Act 1906 (6 Edw. 7. c. 38))
Coroners Act 1487 (repealed)	October 1487 c. 4; 1487 c. 99	13 October 1487
Anent the Crounar quhen he Ressavis his portews. Regarding the Coroner when he Receives his porteous. (Repealed by Statute Law Revision (Scotland) Act 1906 (6 Edw. 7. c. 38))
Murder Act 1487 (repealed)	October 1487 c. 5; 1487 c. 100	13 October 1487
Of the execucion of the actis of parliament anent the punycion of slachter—with addicioun. Of the execution of the acts of parliament regarding the punishment of murder: with additions. (Repealed by Statute Law Revision (Scotland) Act 1906 (6 Edw. 7. c. 38))
Detention of Prisoners Act 1487 (repealed)	October 1487 c. 6; 1487 c. 101	13 October 1487
Of the keping of trespassouris eftir that thai ar takin and arrestit be the crounar. Of the keeping of trespassers after they are taken and arrested by the coroner. (Repealed by Statute Law Revision (Scotland) Act 1906 (6 Edw. 7. c. 38))
Goods of Convicts Act 1487 (repealed)	October 1487 c. 7; 1487 c. 102	13 October 1487
Anent the gudis of convict trespassouris and bringing in the samin to the chekker. Of the goods of convicted trespassers, and bringing the same to the exchequer. (Repealed by Statute Law Revision (Scotland) Act 1906 (6 Edw. 7. c. 38))
Sheriffs and Coroners at Circuit Courts Act 1487 (repealed)	October 1487 c. 8; 1487 c. 103	13 October 1487
Of an assise to be gevin at Justice airis to the schireff and Crounaris gif thai have usit and done thair office trewly. Of an assize to be given at Justice ayers to the sheriff and Coroners, as to whether they have used and done their office truely. (Repealed by Statute Law Revision (Scotland) Act 1906 (6 Edw. 7. c. 38))
Attendance at Courts Act 1487 (repealed)	October 1487 c. 9; 1487 c. 104	13 October 1487
Of the execucioun of the act anent the cumin to Courtis in sobre and quiet wise with addicioun. Of the execution of the act regarding coming to Court in sober and quiet manner, with additions. (Repealed by Statute Law Revision (Scotland) Act 1906 (6 Edw. 7. c. 38))
Jurisdiction and Process in Civil Actions Act 1487 (repealed)	October 1487 c. 10; 1487 c. 105	13 October 1487
Of Jurisdictioun and process in Civile accionis questionis and pleyis. Of Jurisdiction and process in Civil actions, questions and please. (Repealed by Statute Law Revision (Scotland) Act 1906 (6 Edw. 7. c. 38))
Embassy to Rome Act 1487 (repealed)	October 1487 c. 11 —	13 October 1487
That thair be ane ambaxiat send to the king of Romanis (Note: Frederick III, Holy Roman Emperor.) with commissioun to laubour for the doun putting of the letter of marque. That there be an embassy sent to the king of the Romans with commission to work for the revoke the letter of marque. (Repealed by Statute Law Revision (Scotland) Act 1906 (6 Edw. 7. c. 38))
Foreign Traders Act 1487 (repealed)	October 1487 c. 12; 1487 c. 106	13 October 1487
That the Actis of parliament made apon salaris furth of all burowis in the partis of Flandris Holland or Seyland be put to execucioun. That the Acts of parliament made upon sailors from all burghs in the parts of Flanders, Holland, or Zeeland be put into execution. (Repealed by Statute Law Revision (Scotland) Act 1906 (6 Edw. 7. c. 38))
Craftsmen Act 1487 (repealed)	October 1487 c. 13; 1487 c. 107	13 October 1487
That the act of parliament tueching the craftismen usand and deland with merchandise be put to execucion. That the act of parliament touching the craftsmen engaging and dealing with trade be put into execution. (Repealed by Statute Law Revision (Scotland) Act 1906 (6 Edw. 7. c. 38))
Burgh Officers Act 1487 (repealed)	October 1487 c. 14; 1487 c. 108	13 October 1487
That the act of parliament anent the chesing of officiaris in borowis be ratifiit and put to execucioun. That the act of parliament regarding the choosing of burgh officials be ratified and put into execution. (Repealed by Statute Law Revision (Scotland) Act 1906 (6 Edw. 7. c. 38))
Shipping Act 1487 (repealed)	October 1487 c. 15; 1487 c. 109	13 October 1487
That the act of parliament anent the fraucht and laiding of schippis be put to execucioun. That the act of parliament regarding the freight and loading of ships to be put into execution. (Repealed by Statute Law Revision (Scotland) Act 1906 (6 Edw. 7. c. 38))
Salmon Barrels Act 1487 (repealed)	October 1487 c. 16; 1487 c. 110	13 October 1487
Anent the barell bind of salmond not to be mynyst. Regarding the barrel bind of salmon not to be reduced. (Repealed by Statute Law Revision (Scotland) Act 1906 (6 Edw. 7. c. 38))
Royal Burghs Act 1487 still in force	October 1487 c. 17; 1487 c. 111	13 October 1487
That certane commissionaris of borrowis convene in ilk yere. That certain commissioners from all burghs convene in each year.
Sea Fishing Act 1487 (repealed)	October 1487 c. 18 —	13 October 1487
Anent the fisching and making of hering at the west sey. Regarding the fishing and making of herring on the west sea (Repealed by Statute Law Revision (Scotland) Act 1906 (6 Edw. 7. c. 38))
Coldingham Priory Act 1487 Not public and general	October 1487 c. 19 —	13 October 1487
Anent the unioun and ereccioun of the priory of Coldingham to the kingis chapell. About the union and erection of the priory of Coldingham to the king's chapel.
Not public and general	Vol. II, p. 179; 1487 c. 112	13 October 1487

=== January ===
Continuing the 14th parliament of James III, held from 11 January 1488.

Short title, or popular name	Citation	Royal assent
Long title
Church Act 1487 (repealed)	January 1487 c. 1 (Note: This is the citation in the Record Edition.) — (Note: This act is not listed in the Duodecimal Edition.)	29 January 1488
Of the fredom of halikirk. Of the freedom of the holy church. (Repealed by Statute Law Revision (Scotland) Act 1906 (6 Edw. 7. c. 38))
Royal Marriage Act 1487 (repealed)	January 1487 c. 2 —	29 January 1488
Anent the mariagis of our soverane lord and our lord the prince (Note: James IV of Scotland.) his son. About the marriage of our sovereign lord and our lord the prince his son. (Repealed by Statute Law Revision (Scotland) Act 1906 (6 Edw. 7. c. 38))
Berwick Act 1487 (repealed)	January 1487 c. 3 —	29 January 1488
Of the castel and toun of Berwik. Of the castle and town of Berwick. (Repealed by Statute Law Revision (Scotland) Act 1906 (6 Edw. 7. c. 38))
Truce with England Act 1487 (repealed)	January 1487 c. 4 —	29 January 1488
Anent the prolonging of the trewis. About the prolonging of the truce. (Repealed by Statute Law Revision (Scotland) Act 1906 (6 Edw. 7. c. 38))
Appointment of Justices Act 1487 (repealed)	January 1487 c. 5 —	29 January 1488
Of certane personis to be nemmyt to be gret Justicis on the sowth side of forth. Of certain persons to be named to be great Justices on the south side of the Forth. (Repealed by Statute Law Revision (Scotland) Act 1906 (6 Edw. 7. c. 38))
Appointment of Justices (No. 2) Act 1487 (repealed)	January 1487 c. 6 —	29 January 1488
Of the Justicis on north half forth. Of the Justices on the north side of the Forth. (Repealed by Statute Law Revision (Scotland) Act 1906 (6 Edw. 7. c. 38))
Circuit Courts (No. 2) Act 1487 (repealed)	January 1487 c. 7 —	29 January 1488
Of Justice ayeris to be proclamyt. Of Justice ayres to be proclaimed. (Repealed by Statute Law Revision (Scotland) Act 1906 (6 Edw. 7. c. 38))
Coldingham Priory (No. 2) Act 1487 Not public and general	January 1487 c. 8 —	29 January 1488
Anent the mater of Coldinghame twiching the kingis chapell. About the matter of Coldingham touching the king's chapel.
Money Act 1487 (repealed)	January 1487 c. 9 —	29 January 1488
Anent the monye. About the money. (Repealed by Statute Law Revision (Scotland) Act 1906 (6 Edw. 7. c. 38))
Coining Act 1487 (repealed)	January 1487 c. 10 —	29 January 1488
For punicioun of fals Cunyeouris. For punishment of false coiners. (Repealed by Statute Law Revision (Scotland) Act 1906 (6 Edw. 7. c. 38))
Import of Bullion Act 1487 (repealed)	January 1487 c. 11 —	29 January 1488
Anent the Inbringin of bulyeoun and keping of gold and silver within the Realme. About the importation of bullion, and keeping of gold and silver within the Realm. (Repealed by Statute Law Revision (Scotland) Act 1906 (6 Edw. 7. c. 38))
Barratry Act 1487 (repealed)	January 1487 c. 12 —	29 January 1488
Anent Clerkis that makis Impetraciouns of beneficis at the Court of Rome. Regarding Clerics who make Supplications at the Court of Rome. (Repealed by Statute Law Revision (Scotland) Act 1906 (6 Edw. 7. c. 38))
Export of Money Act 1487 (repealed)	January 1487 c. 13 —	29 January 1488
Anent the having of the money furth of the Realme. Regarding the exportation of money out of the Realm. (Repealed by Statute Law Revision (Scotland) Act 1906 (6 Edw. 7. c. 38))
Crime Act 1487 (repealed)	January 1487 c. 14 —	29 January 1488
For the staynching of slauchter thift Reffis hereschippis and uthir trespassis. For the stanching of murder, theft, Robbery, armed raids and other trespasses. (Repealed by Statute Law Revision (Scotland) Act 1906 (6 Edw. 7. c. 38))
Sea Fishing Act 1487 (repealed)	January 1487 c. 15 —	29 January 1488
Anent the fisching and making of hering and uthir fisch at the west sey and lowis. Regarding the fishing and making of herring and other fish on the west sea and Lewis. (Repealed by Statute Law Revision (Scotland) Act 1906 (6 Edw. 7. c. 38))
Legates from Rome Act 1487 (repealed)	January 1487 c. 16 —	29 January 1488
Anent oure souerane lordis bull of privilege tuiching legatis of the Court of Rome. Regarding our sovereign lord's bull of privilege touching legates of the Court of Rome. (Repealed by Statute Law Revision (Scotland) Act 1906 (6 Edw. 7. c. 38))
Civil Jurisdictions Act 1487 (repealed)	January 1487 c. 17 —	29 January 1488
Anent the statute that all acciouns and causis sal pas before the schireffis and Jugez ordinaris Regarding the statute that all actions and causes shall pass before the sheriffs and judges ordinary. (Repealed by Statute Law Revision (Scotland) Act 1906 (6 Edw. 7. c. 38))
Goods of Convicts Act 1487 (repealed)	January 1487 c. 18; 1487 c. 113 (Note: This is the citation in the Duodecimal Edition.)	29 January 1488
Anent the gudis of persouns that ar justifiit. Regarding the goods of persons that are convicted. (Repealed by Statute Law Revision (Scotland) Act 1906 (6 Edw. 7. c. 38))
See of Aberdeen Act 1487 (repealed)	January 1487 c. 19 —	29 January 1488
Anent the vacacioun of the sege of Aberdene. About the vacancy of the see of Aberdeen. (Repealed by Statute Law Revision (Scotland) Act 1906 (6 Edw. 7. c. 38))

=== Sources ===
- Alexander, William (1841). "Acta Parliamentorum Regis Jacobi Tertii". An Abridgement of the Acts of the Parliaments of Scotland. Edinburgh: Adam and Charles Black. p. 446 – via Google Books.
- Alexander, William (1841). "Acta Parliamentorum Regis Jacobi Tertii". An Abridgement of the Acts of the Parliaments of Scotland. Edinburgh: Adam and Charles Black. p. 446 – via Google Books.
- Chronological Table of the Statutes. London: Her Majesty's Stationery Office. 1972. pp. 1323–1324 – via Google Books.
- "Acts of the Old Scottish Parliament: 1487". legislation.gov.uk. The National Archives.
- "Index of Statutes: James III (1460-1488)". Records of the Parliaments of Scotland to 1707. University of St Andrews.

== See also ==
- List of legislation in the United Kingdom
- Records of the Parliaments of Scotland
