= List of acts of the Parliament of Scotland from 1662 =

This is a list of acts of the Parliament of Scotland for the year 1662.

It lists acts of Parliament of the old Parliament of Scotland, that was merged with the old Parliament of England to form the Parliament of Great Britain, by the Union with England Act 1707 (c. 7).

For other years, see list of acts of the Parliament of Scotland. For the period after 1707, see list of acts of the Parliament of Great Britain.

== 1662 ==
The 2nd session of the 1st parliament of Charles II, held in Edinburgh from 8 May 1662.

Short title, or popular name	Citation	Royal assent
Long title
Bishops in Parliament Act 1662 (repealed)	1662 c. 1 (Note: This is the citation in the Record Edition.) — (Note: This act is not listed in the Duodecimal Edition.)	8 May 1662
Act for calling in the Bishops to the Parliament. Act for calling the Bishops to Parliament. (Repealed by Statute Law Revision (Scotland) Act 1906 (6 Edw. 7. c. 38))
Attendance in Parliament Act 1662 (repealed)	1662 c. 2 —	13 May 1662
Act concerning members of Parliament who doe not attend. Act concerning members of Parliament who do not attend. (Repealed by Statute Law Revision (Scotland) Act 1906 (6 Edw. 7. c. 38))
Re-establishment of Prelacy Act 1662 (repealed)	1662 c. 3; 1662 c. 1 (Note: This is the citation in the Duodecimal Edition.)	27 May 1662
Act for the restitution and reestablishment of the antient Government of the Church by Archbishops and Bishops. Act for the restitution and reestablishment of the old Government of the Church by Archbishops and Bishops. (Repealed by Confession of Faith Ratification Act 1690 (c. 7))
Not public and general	1662 c. 4 —	6 June 1662
Act prorogating the Commission for tryell of the burning of the gates of Drumlanrig. Act prorogating Commission for trial of the burning of the gates of Drumlanrig.
Not public and general	1662 c. 5 —	6 June 1662
Act for building a meill market in Air. Act for building a meal-market in Ayr.
Not public and general	1662 c. 6 —	6 June 1662
Act in favours of M^{r} Patrick Weymes Minister. Act in favour of Mr Patrick Wemyss, Minister.
Benefices Act 1662 (repealed)	1662 c. 7; 1662 c. 31	11 June 1662
Act concerning such Benefices and stipends as have been possest without presentations from the lawfull Patrons. Act concerning such Benefices and stipends as have been possessed without presentations from the lawful Patrons. (Repealed by Statute Law Revision (Scotland) Act 1906 (6 Edw. 7. c. 38))
Thanksgiving Act 1662 (repealed)	1662 c. 8 —	11 June 1662
Act for keiping the anniversarie thanks giveing for the Kings Majesties birth and restauration. Act for keeping the anniversary thanksgiving for the King's Majesty's birth and restoration. (Repealed by Statute Law Revision (Scotland) Act 1906 (6 Edw. 7. c. 38))
Corstorphine Fairs Act 1662 Not public and general	1662 c. 9 —	11 June 1662
Act in favours of James Lord Forrester (Note: James Baillie, Lord Forrester.) for four yeerly fairs in Corstorphing. Act in favour of James, Lord Forrester, for four yearly fairs in Corstorphine.
Not public and general	1662 c. 10 —	11 June 1662
Act concerning the Earle of Mortoun (Note: William Douglas, 9th Earl of Morton.) and toun of Kirkwall. Act concerning the Earl of Morton, and the town of Kirkwall.
Creditors of Forfeited Persons Act 1662 (repealed)	1662 c. 11 —	11 June 1662
Act renewing the Commission anent the creditors of forfalted persons. Act renewing the Commission for the creditors of forfeited persons. (Repealed by Statute Law Revision (Scotland) Act 1906 (6 Edw. 7. c. 38))
King's Person and Authority Act 1662 (repealed)	1662 c. 12; 1662 c. 2	24 June 1662
Act for preservation of his Majesties Person, Authoritie and Government. Act for preservation of his Majesty's Person, Authority and Government. (Repealed by Statute Law Revision (Scotland) Act 1906 (6 Edw. 7. c. 38))
Universities Act 1662 (repealed)	1662 c. 13; 1662 c. 4	24 June 1662
Act concerning Masters of Universities Ministers &c. Act concerning Masters of Universities, Ministers, etc. (Repealed by Statute Law Repeal (No. 2) Act 1690 (c. 57))
Not public and general	1662 c. 14 —	24 June 1662
Act in favours of the Lord Fraser (Note: Andrew Fraser, 3rd Lord Fraser.) for his tytle of Lord Fraser. Act in favour of the Lord Fraser, for his title of Lord Fraser.
Not public and general	1662 c. 15 —	24 June 1662
Act in favours of William Levingstoun of Dunduff for raiseing of eight shilling scots for each beast of Scots breed transported into England for a yeer.
Lords of Session Act 1662 (repealed)	1662 c. 16; 1662 c. 7	8 July 1662
Act for the allowance of ten thousand pund Scots yeerlie to the Lords of Session, out of his Majesties Customes. (Repealed by Statute Law Revision (Scotland) Act 1906 (6 Edw. 7. c. 38))
Theft and Robbery Act 1662 (repealed)	1662 c. 17; 1662 c. 8	8 July 1662
Act for suppressing of theft robbries and depradations. (Repealed by Statute Law Revision (Scotland) Act 1906 (6 Edw. 7. c. 38))
Not public and general	1662 c. 18 —	8 July 1662
Act in favours of James Settoun of Pitmedden.
Not public and general	1662 c. 19 —	8 July 1662
Act in favours of the relict of Mr William Wishart person of Leith.
Not public and general	1662 c. 20 —	8 July 1662
Act in favours of Anna Hammilton relict of the deceast Williame Govane.
Not public and general	1662 c. 21 —	8 July 1662
Act in favours of Alex^{r} Johnstoun Merchant burges of Edinburgh.
Not public and general	1662 c. 22 —	17 July 1662
Act appointing the Commissar Courts to be keept in the old toun of Aberdein.
Aberdeen Market Act 1662 Not public and general	1662 c. 23 —	17 July 1662
Act changeing the mercat day in the old toun of Aberdein.
Not public and general	1662 c. 24 —	17 July 1662
Act for releiff to James Earle of Galloway of the leveys imposed upon him in the yeer 1649.
Bishop's Teinds Act 1662 (repealed)	1662 c. 25; 1662 c. 9	31 July 1662
Act anent the teinds belonging to Bishops and other beneficed persons. (Repealed by Statute Law Revision (Scotland) Act 1906 (6 Edw. 7. c. 38))
Not public and general	1662 c. 26 —	31 July 1662
Act in favours of the Bishop of the Yles anent the teind fish.
Not public and general	1662 c. 27 —	31 July 1662
Act in favours of James Earle of Southesk and Robert Lord Burghly anent their decreit against the Shire of Fyffe.
Relief Act 1662 (repealed)	1662 c. 28; 1662 c. 9	7 August 1662
Act for releeff of those who wer overburthened in their leveys anno 1649 for their concurrence in the Engadgment 1648. (Repealed by Statute Law Revision (Scotland) Act 1906 (6 Edw. 7. c. 38))
Not public and general	1662 c. 29 —	7 August 1662
Act and Decreet in favours of Patrick Lentron against the Magistrates of S^{t} Andrews.
Not public and general	1662 c. 30 —	7 August 1662
Act for building a meill market in Dumfreis.
Not public and general	1662 c. 31 —	7 August 1662
Act in favours of James Earle of Pearth and others for some moneys due to them be the Shire of Pearth.
Not public and general	1662 c. 32 —	7 August 1662
Act in favours of the heritors and inhabitants of Atholl anent the payment of bygone mantenance.
Not public and general	1662 c. 33 —	7 August 1662
Act in favours of the Earle of Sutherland and Lord Strathnaver anent the vacand Stipends of Golspie Largie &c.
Not public and general	1662 c. 34 —	7 August 1662
Act concerning the Chapter of the Bishoprick of Argyll.
Not public and general	1662 c. 35 —	7 August 1662
Addition to the Commissioners of Excise in the shire of Kincarden.
Not public and general	1662 c. 36 —	7 August 1662
Act rescinding the pretendit forfaltour of Collonell Patrick Leith of Harthill.
Not public and general	1662 c. 37 —	7 August 1662
Act discharging some Ministers of Edin burgh from the exercise of their ministerie.
Registers Act 1662 (repealed)	1662 c. 38 —	12 August 1662
Act for keeping the Registers of Session in the Parliament house. (Repealed by Statute Law Revision (Scotland) Act 1906 (6 Edw. 7. c. 38))
Not public and general	1662 c. 39 —	12 August 1662
Commission for the Creditors of the late Marques of Argyll & other forfalted persons &c.
Not public and general	1662 c. 40 —	15 August 1662
Act in favours of the Earle of Calander anent the rebatement of annual rents due to his creditors being minors.
Not public and general	1662 c. 41 —	15 August 1662
Act & Decreit in favours of Sir Johne Gordon of Haddo against William Forbes of Leslie.
Not public and general	1662 c. 42 —	15 August 1662
Act and Decreit in favours of George Marques of Huntlie against Sir Robert Innes and Sir John Urquhart of Cromertie.
Not public and general	1662 c. 43 —	19 August 1662
Act anent the demission of James Borthwick as Commissioner from the toun of Edinburgh.
Not public and general	1662 c. 44 —	26 August 1662
Act for changing the way betuixt the south Queinsferric and Crawmond.
Not public and general	1662 c. 45 —	26 August 1662
Act in favours of the toun of Edinburgh for an Imposition upon wyne.
Earldom of Orkney Act 1662 Not public and general	1662 c. 46 —	26 August 1662
Act of Dissolution of the Earledome of Orknay from the Crowne in favours of George Viscount Grandison.
Not public and general	1662 c. 47 —	26 August 1662
Act in favours of Rorie M^{c}Leod of Dunivagan anent the recovering of a fine imposed on him in 1655.
Not public and general	1662 c. 48 —	26 August 1662
Act and Decreit in favours of Rorie M^{c}Leod of Dunivagan against Dougall M^{c}pherson of Powrie and M^{r} David Drummond late Minister at Crieff.
Not public and general	1662 c. 49 —	26 August 1662
Act and Decreit in favours of Sir James M^{c}Donnell of Slate against Dougall Campbell of Inverra.
Revocation Act 1662 (repealed)	1662 c. 50; 1662 c. 8	3 September 1662
The Kings Majesties generall Revocation with a Declaration thereanent. The King's Majesty's general Revocation with a Declaration regarding it. (Repealed by Statute Law Revision (Scotland) Act 1906 (6 Edw. 7. c. 38))
Not public and general	1662 c. 51 —	3 September 1662
Act for ane Archdeanery in the Ysles. Act for an Archdeanery in the Isles.
Not public and general	1662 c. 52 —	3 September 1662
Act in favours of Sir Robert Fletcher of Inverpeffer.
Lyon King of Arms Act 1662 (repealed)	1662 c. 53 —	3 September 1662
Act in favours of the Lord Lyon King at Armes. Act in favour of the Lord Lyon King at Arms. (Repealed by Defence of the Realm Act 1693 (c. 15))
Declaration de Fideli Act 1662 (repealed)	1662 c. 54; 1662 c. 5	3 September 1662
Act concerning the Declaration to be signed by all persons in public trust. Act concerning the Declaration to be signed by all persons in public trust. (Repealed by Statute Law Repeal (No. 2) Act 1690 (c. 57))
Not public and general	1662 c. 55 —	5 September 1662
Act and Decreit in favours of Henry Whalley against Sir William Baillie of Lamingtoun Knight.
Not public and general	1662 c. 56 —	5 September 1662
Act in favours of the toun of S^{t} Andrews for ane imposition upon wyne &c.
Not public and general	1662 c. 57 —	5 September 1662
Act in favours of James Earle of Queinsberrie and James Earl of Annandale and Hartfell for payment of a moneths Cesse advanced by them for the Shire of Dumfreis in 1645.
Not public and general	1662 c. 58 —	5 September 1662
Act in favours of the inhabitants of Orknay and Zetland anent their fishings and trade.
Not public and general	1662 c. 59 —	5 September 1662
Act in favours of Murdoch Bishop of Murray for reparation of his Manse of Spynie.
Not public and general	1662 c. 60 —	5 September 1662
Act in favours of Sir Patrick Ogilvie of Boyne Knight for collecting tuo moneths mantenance of the Shire of Selkirk advanced by him in 1650.
Not public and general	1662 c. 61 —	5 September 1662
Act in favours of David Rickhart of Achnacant against Robert Buchan appearand of Portletham.
Not public and general	1662 c. 62 —	5 September 1662
Act in favours of John Leith of Harthill against William and Patrick Leiths.
Not public and general	1662 c. 63 —	5 September 1662
Act and Decreit in favours of George Marques of Huntlie against Robert Foulis late baillie of Edinburgh and Sir William Gordoun of Lismoir and others.
Not public and general	1662 c. 64 —	5 September 1662
Act in favours of Alexr Jarden of Aplegirth against the Shirreffdome of Dumfrees &c.
Not public and general	1662 c. 65 —	5 September 1662
Act and Remit anent the selling of grund malt within the burgh of Aberdeen.
Aberdeen Market (No. 2) Act 1662 Not public and general	1662 c. 66 —	5 September 1662
Act for changeing the mercat day in the Old toun of Abirdein.
Not public and general	1662 c. 67 —	5 September 1662
Act in favours of Sir George Gordoun of Haddo for a yeerlie fair and weeklie mercat within the toun of Tarves.
Not public and general	1662 c. 68 —	5 September 1662
Act in favours of James Earle of Kinghorne for tuo yeerlie fairs in the toun of Longforgun.
Not public and general	1662 c. 69 —	5 September 1662
Act in favours of Sir Johne Campbell of Glenurquhy for a yeerlie fair and weeklie mercat at Straffillan.
Not public and general	1662 c. 70 —	5 September 1662
Act in favours of Sir George McKenzie of Tarbet for a yeerly fair and weekly mercat at Milntoun and a yeerlie fair at the kirktoun of Fothertie.
Pardon Act 1662 or the Act of Indemnity and Oblivion 1662 (repealed)	1662 c. 71; 1662 c. 10	9 September 1662
The Kings Majesties gracious and free Pardon, Act of Indemnity and Oblivion. The King's Majesty's gracious and free Pardon, Act of Indemnity and Oblivion. (Repealed by Statute Law Revision (Scotland) Act 1906 (6 Edw. 7. c. 38))
Not public and general	1662 c. 72 —	9 September 1662
Act in favours of the Countes of Branfurd and Ladie Forrester.
Forfeited Persons Act 1662 (repealed)	1662 c. 73 —	9 September 1662
Act anent the children and posteritie of forfeited persons. Act regarding the children and inheritance of forfeited persons. (Repealed by Statute Law Revision (Scotland) Act 1906 (6 Edw. 7. c. 38))
Abatement of Exercise Act 1662 (repealed)	1662 c. 74 —	9 September 1662
Act anent the abatement of Excise to some Shires and Burghs. Act regarding the abatement of Excise to some Shires and Burghs. (Repealed by Statute Law Revision (Scotland) Act 1906 (6 Edw. 7. c. 38))
Not public and general	1662 c. 75 —	9 September 1662
Act and Recommendation in favours of Æneas Lord M^{c}Donnell anent the reparation of his losses out of the late Marques of Argylls estate.
Not public and general	1662 c. 76 —	9 September 1662
Act in favours of Sir James Lawmont of Lawmont for repossessing him in his lands.
Not public and general	1662 c. 77 —	9 September 1662
Act and Warrant for payment of tuo hundreth punds to William Lord Bellenden.
Not public and general	1662 c. 78 —	9 September 1662
Act and Decreit in favours of John McDougall of Dunolich and others against Johne Campbell of Dunstaffnage and others.
Not public and general	1662 c. 79 —	9 September 1662
Act in favours of Johne Earle of Hadingtoun for tuo fairs yeerly and a weekly mercat at Dalmeny.
Not public and general	1662 c. 80 —	9 September 1662
Act containing some Exceptions from the Act of Indemnitie.
Not public and general	1662 c. 81 —	9 September 1662
Commission for rectifying the Valuations of Aberdeen Shire.
Not public and general	1662 c. 82 —	9 September 1662
Commission for rectifieing the Valuations in Berwick Shire.
Public Debt Act 1662 (repealed)	1662 c. 83 —	9 September 1662
Act suspending publict debts till the next session of Parliament. Act suspending public debts until the next session of Parliament. (Repealed by Statute Law Revision (Scotland) Act 1906 (6 Edw. 7. c. 38))
Debtor and Creditor Act 1662 (repealed)	1662 c. 84 —	9 September 1662
Act in favours of these who wer absent and tooke the benefite of the act anent Debitor and Creditor at London. (Repealed by Statute Law Revision (Scotland) Act 1906 (6 Edw. 7. c. 38))
Not public and general	1662 c. 85 —	9 September 1662
Reference to the Lords of Session in favours of Robert Lord Burghlie.
Not public and general	1662 c. 86 —	9 September 1662
Reference to the Lords of Session in favours of Sir Archibald Stirline of Carden.
Not public and general	1662 c. 87 —	9 September 1662
Ratification in favours of Sir Robert Grahame of Morphie of his fishings on Northesk.
Not public and general	1662 c. 88 —	9 September 1662
Ratification in favours of James Archbishop of S_{t} Andrews of the Archbishoprick, Pryorie and Abbacy of S^{t} Andrews.
Not public and general	1662 c. 89 —	9 September 1662
Ratification in favours of David Bishope of Breichen and his successors of the Monasterie of Aberbrothock &c.
Not public and general	1662 c. 90 —	9 September 1662
Ratification in favours of David Bishop of Argyll of the jurisdiction of Commissariotship &c. within the dyocie of Argyll.
Not public and general	1662 c. 91 —	9 September 1662
Ratification in favours of John Earle of Crafford and Lindesay of his gift out of his Majesties rents &c.
Not public and general	1662 c. 92 —	9 September 1662
Ratification in favours of Charles Duke of Lennox of the offices of Great Admirall of Scotland, Leivtennandrie upon the Seas &c.
Not public and general	1662 c. 93 —	9 September 1662
Ratification in favours of Charles Duke of Lennox of the fewfermes and dewties of the lands of Yla.
Not public and general	1662 c. 94 —	9 September 1662
Ratification in favours of Johne Earle of Atholl &c. of the keeping of the Park of Falkland &c.
Not public and general	1662 c. 95 —	9 September 1662
Ratification in favours of Johne Earle of Atholl &c. of the office of Justice Generall of Scotland.
Not public and general	1662 c. 96 —	9 September 1662
Ratification in favours of Sir Johne Gilmour Knight President of the College of Justice of the lands of Craiglockhart.
Not public and general	1662 c. 97 —	9 September 1662
Ratification in favours of Thomas Bishop of Galloway.
Not public and general	1662 c. 98 —	9 September 1662
Ratification in favours of John Allardice of that ilk.
Not public and general	1662 c. 99 —	9 September 1662
Ratification in favours of Johne Campbell of Glenurwhie of the office of Forrestrie of Mamlorne.
Not public and general	1662 c. 100 —	9 September 1662
Ratification in favours of Sir Johne Wrquhart of Cromertie of the lands and baronie of Cromertie.
Not public and general	1662 c. 101 —	9 September 1662
Ratification in favours of Sir John Wrquhart of Cromertie uniting the paroches of Cullicudden and Kirkmichaell.
Not public and general	1662 c. 102 —	9 September 1662
Ratification in favours of Johne Beatoun of Blebo of the lands of Blebo &c.
Not public and general	1662 c. 103 —	9 September 1662
Ratification in favours of the Burgh of Linlithgow for a yeerlie fair.
Not public and general	1662 c. 104 —	9 September 1662
Ratification in favours of Sir Johne Strachan of his offices of third receaver of his Majesties rents and Chalmerlane of Rosse.
Not public and general	1662 c. 105 —	9 September 1662
Ratification in favours of Leivtennent Collonell Paull Symmer of Pitmukstoun of the office of Mair of fie of the Shirreffdome of Aberdein.
Not public and general	1662 c. 106 —	9 September 1662
Ratification in favours of James Earle of Annandale and Hartfell &c. of the office of Stewart of Annandaill.
Not public and general	1662 c. 107 —	9 September 1662
Ratification in favours of James Earle of Newburgh of his tack of the Custome of the borders.
Not public and general	1662 c. 108 —	9 September 1662
Ratification in favours of Sir Robert Innes of Muretoun of the baronie of Muretoun &c.
Not public and general	1662 c. 109 —	9 September 1662
Ratification in favours of George Bishop of Edinburgh of the Bishoprick of Edinburgh.
Not public and general	1662 c. 110 —	9 September 1662
Ratification in favours of Johne Hunter of Baigay of his fishings.
Saving the Rights Act 1662 Not public and general	1662 c. 111; 1662 c. 11	9 September 1662
Act Salvo Jure cujuslibet. Act Salvo Jure cujuslibet.
Adjournment Act 1662 (repealed)	1662 c. 112; 1662 c. 12	9 September 1662
Act of Adjournment. Act of Adjournment. (Repealed by Statute Law Revision (Scotland) Act 1906 (6 Edw. 7. c. 38))

=== Sources ===
- Alexander, William (1841). "Acta Parliamentorum Regis Caroli Secundi". An Abridgement of the Acts of the Parliaments of Scotland. Edinburgh: Adam and Charles Black. pp. A55 – A57 – via Google Books.
- Alexander, William (1841). "Acta Parliamentorum Regis Caroli Secundi". An Abridgement of the Acts of the Parliaments of Scotland. Edinburgh: Adam and Charles Black. pp. A55 – A57 – via Google Books.
- Chronological Table of the Statutes. London: Her Majesty's Stationery Office. 1972. pp. 1352–1353 – via Google Books.
- "Index of Statutes: Index of Statutes: Charles II (1649-1685)". Records of the Parliaments of Scotland to 1707. University of St Andrews.

== See also ==
- List of legislation in the United Kingdom
- Records of the Parliaments of Scotland
