= List of acts of the Parliament of Scotland from 1524 =

This is a list of acts of the Parliament of Scotland for the year 1524.

It lists acts of Parliament of the old Parliament of Scotland, that was merged with the old Parliament of England to form the Parliament of Great Britain, by the Union with England Act 1707 (c. 7).

For other years, see list of acts of the Parliament of Scotland. For the period after 1707, see list of acts of the Parliament of Great Britain.

== 1524 ==
=== November ===
A parliament of James V, held in Edinburgh from 14 November 1524 until 16 November 1524.

Short title, or popular name	Citation	Royal assent
Long title
Church Act 1524 (repealed)	November 1524 c. 1 (Note: This is the citation in the Record Edition.) — (Note: This act is not listed in the Duodecimal Edition.)	16 November 1524
Of the halikirk. Of the holy church. (Repealed by Statute Law Revision (Scotland) Act 1906 (6 Edw. 7. c. 38))
Regent Act 1524 (repealed)	November 1524 c. 2 —	16 November 1524
Tuiching the expiry of the office of tutory and governance of Jhone Duke of Albany. (Note: John Stewart, Duke of Albany.); Touching the expiry of the office of tutorage and governance of John, Duke of Albany. (Repealed by Statute Law Revision (Scotland) Act 1906 (6 Edw. 7. c. 38))
Guardianship of King Act 1524 (repealed)	November 1524 c. 3 —	16 November 1524
Appointement of the quenis grace to haif the keping and reule of the kingis persone. Appointment of the queen's grace to have the keeping and keeping and rule of the king's person. (Repealed by Statute Law Revision (Scotland) Act 1906 (6 Edw. 7. c. 38))
Casualties Falling to King Act 1524 (repealed)	November 1524 c. 4 —	16 November 1524
Anent the dispositioun of wardis mariagis and all vtheris the kingis casualiteis. Regarding the disposition of wards, marriages, and all other the king's casualties. (Repealed by Statute Law Revision (Scotland) Act 1906 (6 Edw. 7. c. 38))
Privy Council Act 1524 (repealed)	November 1524 c. 5 —	16 November 1524
Of our souerane lordis secret counsale. Of our sovereign lord's secret council. (Repealed by Statute Law Revision (Scotland) Act 1906 (6 Edw. 7. c. 38))
Embassy to England Act 1524 (repealed)	November 1524 c. 6 —	16 November 1524
Of the granting ane commission to the ambaxatours that now are to pas in Ingland. Of the granting of a commission to the ambassadors that are now to pass into England. (Repealed by Statute Law Revision (Scotland) Act 1906 (6 Edw. 7. c. 38))
Administration of Justice Act 1524 (repealed)	November 1524 c. 7 —	16 November 1524
Of the sessioun. Of the session. (Repealed by Statute Law Revision (Scotland) Act 1906 (6 Edw. 7. c. 38))
Administration of Justice (No. 2) Act 1524 (repealed)	November 1524 c. 8 —	16 November 1524
Of the administratioun of Justice in criminale actiouns. Of the administration of Justice in criminal actions. (Repealed by Statute Law Revision (Scotland) Act 1906 (6 Edw. 7. c. 38))
Theft Act 1524 (repealed)	November 1524 c. 9 —	16 November 1524
Anent stanching of thift. Regarding the prevention of theft. (Repealed by Statute Law Revision (Scotland) Act 1906 (6 Edw. 7. c. 38))
Coin Act 1524 (repealed)	November 1524 c. 10 —	16 November 1524
Of the cunye. Of the coin. (Repealed by Statute Law Revision (Scotland) Act 1906 (6 Edw. 7. c. 38))
Crown Rents Act 1524 (repealed)	November 1524 c. 11 —	16 November 1524
Anent the inbringing of our soverane lordis propirtie. Of the collection of our sovereign lord's property. (Repealed by Statute Law Revision (Scotland) Act 1906 (6 Edw. 7. c. 38))
Crown Lands Act 1524 (repealed)	November 1524 c. 12 —	16 November 1524
Anent the kingis propir landis sett in few-ferme and assedatioun for xix yeris and vtheris lang termes be Jhone Duke of Albany. Regarding the king's proper lands in feu-farm and assedation for 19 years and other long terms by John, Duke of Albany. (Repealed by Statute Law Revision (Scotland) Act 1906 (6 Edw. 7. c. 38))
Remissions Act 1524 (repealed)	November 1524 c. 13 —	16 November 1524
Anent remissioun for slauchtir. Regarding remission for murder. (Repealed by Statute Law Revision (Scotland) Act 1906 (6 Edw. 7. c. 38)))

=== February ===
A parliament of James V, held in Edinburgh from 15 February 1525 until 23 February 1525.

Short title, or popular name	Citation	Royal assent
Long title
Privy Council (No. 2) Act 1524 (repealed)	February 1524 c. 1 (Note: This is the citation in the Record Edition.) — (Note: This act is not listed in the Duodecimal Edition.)	23 February 1525
Anent the Secret Counsale. About the Secret Council. (Repealed by Statute Law Revision (Scotland) Act 1906 (6 Edw. 7. c. 38))
King's Pension Act 1524 (repealed)	February 1524 c. 2 —	23 February 1525
Anent the removing of the kyng. Regarding the removing of the king. (Repealed by Statute Law Revision (Scotland) Act 1906 (6 Edw. 7. c. 38))
Benefices Act 1524 (repealed)	February 1524 c. 3 —	23 February 1525
Anent the dispositioun of beneficez. Regarding the disposition of benefices. (Repealed by Statute Law Revision (Scotland) Act 1906 (6 Edw. 7. c. 38))
King's Person (No. 2) Act 1524 (repealed)	February 1524 c. 4 —	23 February 1525
Anent the sure keping of the king. Regarding the sure keeping of the king. (Repealed by Statute Law Revision (Scotland) Act 1906 (6 Edw. 7. c. 38))
Government of the Realm Act 1524 (repealed)	February 1524 c. 5 —	23 February 1525
Anent the giding of the realme. Regarding the guiding of the realm. (Repealed by Statute Law Revision (Scotland) Act 1906 (6 Edw. 7. c. 38))
Borders Act 1524 (repealed)	February 1524 c. 6 —	23 February 1525
Anent the reule of the bordouris. Regarding the rule of the borders. (Repealed by Statute Law Revision (Scotland) Act 1906 (6 Edw. 7. c. 38))
Trade with England Act 1524 (repealed)	February 1524 c. 7 —	23 February 1525
Anent the taking of gudis in Ingland. Regarding the taking of goods into England. (Repealed by Statute Law Revision (Scotland) Act 1906 (6 Edw. 7. c. 38))
Salt Act 1524 (repealed)	February 1524 c. 8 —	23 February 1525
Anent the taking of salt out of the realme. Regarding the talking of salt out of the realm. (Repealed by Statute Law Revision (Scotland) Act 1906 (6 Edw. 7. c. 38))
Seals Act 1524 (repealed)	February 1524 c. 9 —	23 February 1525
Anent the keping of the selis. Regarding the keeping of the seals. (Repealed by Statute Law Revision (Scotland) Act 1906 (6 Edw. 7. c. 38))
Crown Property Act 1524 (repealed)	February 1524 c. 10 —	23 February 1525
Anent the kingis propirtie. Regarding the king's property. (Repealed by Statute Law Revision (Scotland) Act 1906 (6 Edw. 7. c. 38))
Edinburgh Castle Act 1524 (repealed)	February 1524 c. 11 —	23 February 1525
Tuiching the capitane of the castell of Edinburgh. Touching the captain of the castle of Edinburgh. (Repealed by Statute Law Revision (Scotland) Act 1906 (6 Edw. 7. c. 38))
Earl of Morton Act 1524 (repealed)	February 1524 c. 12 —	23 February 1525
Annullatioun of all proces of tressoun aganis James Erle of Mortoun (Note: James Douglas, 3rd Earl of Morton.) and utheris. Annulation of all process of treason against James, Earl of Morton. (Repealed by Statute Law Revision (Scotland) Act 1906 (6 Edw. 7. c. 38))

=== Sources ===
- Alexander, William (1841). "Acta Parliamentorum Regis Jacobi Quinti". An Abridgement of the Acts of the Parliaments of Scotland. Edinburgh: Adam and Charles Black. pp. A14 – A15 – via Google Books.
- Alexander, William (1841). "Acta Parliamentorum Regis Jacobi Quinti". An Abridgement of the Acts of the Parliaments of Scotland. Edinburgh: Adam and Charles Black. pp. A14 – A15 – via Google Books.
- Chronological Table of the Statutes. London: Her Majesty's Stationery Office. 1972. pp. 1327–1328 – via Google Books.
- "Index of Statutes: James V (1513-1542)". Records of the Parliaments of Scotland to 1707. University of St Andrews.

== See also ==
- List of legislation in the United Kingdom
- Records of the Parliaments of Scotland
