= List of acts of the Parliament of Scotland from 1496 =

This is a list of acts of the Parliament of Scotland for the year 1496.

It lists acts of Parliament of the old Parliament of Scotland, that was merged with the old Parliament of England to form the Parliament of Great Britain, by the Union with England Act 1707 (c. 7).

For other years, see list of acts of the Parliament of Scotland. For the period after 1707, see list of acts of the Parliament of Great Britain.

== 1496 ==
The 5th parliament of James IV.

Short title, or popular name	Citation	Royal assent
Long title
Church Act 1496 (repealed)	1496 c. 1 (Note: This is the citation in the Record Edition.) — (Note: This act is not listed in the Duodecimal Edition.)	13 June 1496
Of the libertie and fredome of haly kirk. Of the liberty and freedom of the holy church. (Repealed by Statute Law Revision (Scotland) Act 1906 (6 Edw. 7. c. 38))
Barratry Act 1496 (repealed)	1496 c. 2; 1496 c. 53 (Note: This is the citation in the Duodecimal Edition.)	13 June 1496
Anent the impetratioun and purchessing at the court of Rome benefices elective and utheris. Regarding the application and purchasing at the court of Rome of elective benefices and others. (Repealed by Statute Law Revision (Scotland) Act 1906 (6 Edw. 7. c. 38))
Education Act 1496 (repealed)	1496 c. 3; 1496 c. 54	13 June 1496
That all barronis and frehaldaris of substance put thair eldest sonis and airis to the sculis. That all barons and freeholders of substance put their eldest sons and heirs into school. (Repealed by Statute Law Revision (Scotland) Act 1906 (6 Edw. 7. c. 38))
Money Act 1496 (repealed)	1496 c. 4; 1496 c. 55	13 June 1496
Of the maister of the money and of cunye and the inbringing of bulyeoun. Of the master of the money, and of minting and the importation of bullion. (Repealed by Statute Law Revision (Scotland) Act 1906 (6 Edw. 7. c. 38))
Workmen's Prices Act 1496 (repealed)	1496 c. 5; 1496 c. 56	13 June 1496
Of the prices maid upone all maner of stuffe wrocht be ony maner of werkman. Of the prices set upon all manner of stuff made by any manner of workman. (Repealed by Statute Law Revision (Scotland) Act 1906 (6 Edw. 7. c. 38))
Summons of Error Act 1496 (repealed)	1496 c. 6; 1496 c. 57	13 June 1496
Anent summondis of errour or Inordinat proces. Regarding summons of error or Improper process. (Repealed by Statute Law Revision (Scotland) Act 1906 (6 Edw. 7. c. 38))

=== Sources ===
- Alexander, William (1841). "Acta Parliamentorum Regis Jacobi Quarti". An Abridgement of the Acts of the Parliaments of Scotland. Edinburgh: Adam and Charles Black. p. 448 – via Google Books.
- Alexander, William (1841). "Acta Parliamentorum Regis Jacobi Quarti". An Abridgement of the Acts of the Parliaments of Scotland. Edinburgh: Adam and Charles Black. p. 448 – via Google Books.
- Chronological Table of the Statutes. London: Her Majesty's Stationery Office. 1972. p. 1326 – via Google Books.
- "Index of Statutes: James IV (1488-1513)". Records of the Parliaments of Scotland to 1707. University of St Andrews.

== See also ==
- List of legislation in the United Kingdom
- Records of the Parliaments of Scotland
