= List of acts of the Parliament of Scotland from 1429 =

This is a list of acts of the Parliament of Scotland for the year 1429.

It lists acts of Parliament of the old Parliament of Scotland, that was merged with the old Parliament of England to form the Parliament of Great Britain, by the Union with England Act 1707 (c. 7).

For other years, see list of acts of the Parliament of Scotland. For the period after 1707, see list of acts of the Parliament of Great Britain.

== 1429 ==
Continuing the 8th parliament of James I, held in Perth on 26 April 1429.

Short title, or popular name	Citation	Royal assent
Long title
Treason Act (Scotland) 1429 (repealed)	April 1429 c. 1 (Note: This is the citation in the Record Edition.); 1428 c. 110 (Note: This is the citation in the Duodecimal Edition.)	26 April 1429
De fugientibus a Rege vel alio quocunque ejus locum tenente. Of those fleeing from the King or any of his representatives. (Repealed by Statute Law Revision (Scotland) Act 1906 (6 Edw. 7. c. 38))
Husbandmen Act 1429 (repealed)	April 1429 c. 2 — (Note: This act is not listed in the Duodecimal Edition.)	26 April 1429
De colonis pro anno futuro non removendis. Not removing the husbandmen for the coming year. (Repealed by Statute Law Revision (Scotland) Act 1906 (6 Edw. 7. c. 38))

The 9th parliament of James I, held in Perth on 6 March 1430.

Short title, or popular name	Citation	Royal assent
Long title
Mayors of Fee Act 1429 (repealed)	March 1429 c. 1 (Note: This is the citation in the Record Edition.) c. 111 (Note: This is the citation in the Duodecimal Edition.)	6 March 1430
Of mayris of fee. Of mayors of fee. (Repealed by Statute Law Revision (Scotland) Act 1906 (6 Edw. 7. c. 38))
Summons Act 1429 (repealed)	March 1429 c. 2; 1429 c. 112	6 March 1430
Of summondis. Of summons. (Repealed by Statute Law Revision (Scotland) Act 1906 (6 Edw. 7. c. 38))
Brieves Act 1429 (repealed)	March 1429 c. 3; 1429 c. 113	6 March 1430
Anent excepcionis agane the kingis breifis. About exceptions against the king's brieves. (Repealed by Statute Law Revision (Scotland) Act 1964 (c. 80))
Essonvies Act 1429 (repealed)	March 1429 c. 4; 1429 c. 114	6 March 1430
Of essonyeis. Of essoins. (Repealed by Statute Law Revision (Scotland) Act 1906 (6 Edw. 7. c. 38))
Caution to Abide Judgment Act 1429 (repealed)	March 1429 c. 5; 1429 c. 115	6 March 1430
Of borghis fundyn be defendouris apon a weir of law and thar fredome to be avisit. Of surety is found to be defended on a point of law and that freedom to be advised. (Repealed by Statute Law Revision (Scotland) Act 1906 (6 Edw. 7. c. 38))
Appeals Act 1429 (repealed)	March 1429 c. 6; 1429 c. 116	6 March 1430
Of falsing of domis. Of falsifying of decisions. (Repealed by Statute Law Revision (Scotland) Act 1906 (6 Edw. 7. c. 38))
Procedure in Appeals Act 1429 (repealed)	March 1429 c. 7; 1429 c. 117	6 March 1430
Of recounteris and of the absens of the partiis at the dome geving of the docrete. Of countering and of the absence of the parties at the judgment giving the sentence. (Repealed by Statute Law Revision (Scotland) Act 1906 (6 Edw. 7. c. 38))
Sumptuary Law Act 1429 (repealed)	March 1429 c. 8; 1429 c. 118	6 March 1430
Of the array of knychtis lordis vtheris. Of the attire of knights, lords and others. (Repealed by Statute Law Revision (Scotland) Act 1906 (6 Edw. 7. c. 38))
Sumptuary Law (No. 2) Act 1429 (repealed)	March 1429 c. 9 — (Note: This act is not listed in the Duodecimal Edition.)	6 March 1430
Of the array of burgessis and their wyffis. Of the attire of burgesses and their wives. (Repealed by Statute Law Revision (Scotland) Act 1906 (6 Edw. 7. c. 38))
Sumptuary Law (No. 3) Act 1429 (repealed)	March 1429 c. 10 —	6 March 1430
Of the array of yemen and commonis to landwartis. Of the attire of yeomen and commoners to landward. (Repealed by Statute Law Revision (Scotland) Act 1906 (6 Edw. 7. c. 38))
Defence of the Realm Act 1429 (repealed)	March 1429 c. 11; 1429 c. 120	6 March 1430
Anent the maner of grathing of gentilmen and utheris for weir. About the manner of preparing gentlemen and others for war. (Repealed by Statute Law Revision (Scotland) Act 1906 (6 Edw. 7. c. 38))
Defence of the Realm (No. 2) Act 1429 (repealed)	March 1429 c. 12; 1429 c. 121	6 March 1430
Anent the maner of grathing of yemen for weir. Of the manner of preparing yeomen for war. (Repealed by Statute Law Revision (Scotland) Act 1906 (6 Edw. 7. c. 38))
Defence of the Realm (No. 3) Act 1429 (repealed)	March 1429 c. 13; 1429 c. 122	6 March 1430
Of unlawis to be raisit of thaim nocht bodyn as is before wryttin. Of fines to be raised of those not equipped as it is before written. (Repealed by Statute Law Revision (Scotland) Act 1906 (6 Edw. 7. c. 38))
Defence of the Realm (No. 4) Act 1429 (repealed)	March 1429 c. 14; 1429 c. 123	6 March 1430
Anent the maner of grathing of burgessis for weir. About the manner of preparing burgesses for war. (Repealed by Statute Law Revision (Scotland) Act 1906 (6 Edw. 7. c. 38))
Shipwrecks Act 1429 (repealed)	March 1429 c. 15; 1429 c. 124	6 March 1430
Anent schippis that brekis within the boundis of this realme. About ships that wreck within the bounds of this realm. (Repealed by Statute Law Revision (Scotland) Act 1906 (6 Edw. 7. c. 38))
Advocates' Oath Act 1429 (repealed)	March 1429 c. 16; 1429 c. 125	6 March 1430
Of the aith of advocatis in temporalle courtis. Of the oath of advocates in temporal courts. (Repealed by Statute Law Revision (Scotland) Act 1906 (6 Edw. 7. c. 38))
Galleys Act 1429 (repealed)	March 1429 c. 17; 1429 c. 126	6 March 1430
Anent the making and reparalling of galayis. About the making and repairing of galleys. (Repealed by Statute Law Revision (Scotland) Act 1906 (6 Edw. 7. c. 38))
Brief of Sasine Act 1429 (repealed)	March 1429 c. 18; 1429 c. 127	6 March 1430
Of the breif of seysing. Of the brief of sasine. (Repealed by Statute Law Revision (Scotland) Act 1906 (6 Edw. 7. c. 38))
Fugitives to England Act 1429 (repealed)	March 1429 c. 19; 1429 c. 128	6 March 1430
Of the kingis liegis that remanis in Ingland aganis the kingis will. Of the king's lieges that remain in England against the king's will. (Repealed by Statute Law Revision (Scotland) Act 1906 (6 Edw. 7. c. 38))
Lawburrows Act 1429 still in force	March 1429 c. 20; 1429 c. 129	6 March 1430
Of soverte askit be ony of the kingis liegis that hes doute of his life. Of surety asked by any of the king's lieges that fear for his life.
Service of Inquests and Retours Act 1429 (repealed)	March 1429 c. 21; 1429 c. 130	6 March 1430
Anent the service of inquestis ad retouris to the kingis chapell. About the service of inquests and returns to the king's chapel. (Repealed by Statute Law Revision (Scotland) Act 1906 (6 Edw. 7. c. 38))
Salmon Act 1429 (repealed)	March 1429 c. 22; 1429 c. 131	6 March 1430
Anent the act of the fishing of salmonde. About the act of the fishing of salmon. (Repealed by Statute Law Revision (Scotland) Act 1906 (6 Edw. 7. c. 38))

=== Sources ===
- Alexander, William (1841). "Acta Parliamentorum Regis Jacobi Primi". An Abridgement of the Acts of the Parliaments of Scotland. Edinburgh: Adam and Charles Black. p. 439 – via Google Books.
- Alexander, William (1841). "Acta Parliamentorum Regis Jacobi Primi". An Abridgement of the Acts of the Parliaments of Scotland. Edinburgh: Adam and Charles Black. p. 439 – via Google Books.
- Chronological Table of the Statutes. London: Her Majesty's Stationery Office. 1972. p. 1316 – via Google Books.
- "Acts of the Old Scottish Parliament: 1429". legislation.gov.uk. The National Archives.
- "Index of Statutes: James I (1406-1337)". Records of the Parliaments of Scotland to 1707. University of St Andrews.

== See also ==
- List of legislation in the United Kingdom
- Records of the Parliaments of Scotland
