= List of acts of the Parliament of Scotland from 1483 =

This is a list of acts of the Parliament of Scotland for the year 1483.

It lists acts of Parliament of the old Parliament of Scotland, that was merged with the old Parliament of England to form the Parliament of Great Britain, by the Union with England Act 1707 (c. 7).

For other years, see list of acts of the Parliament of Scotland. For the period after 1707, see list of acts of the Parliament of Great Britain.

== 1483 ==
The 13th parliament of James III.

Short title, or popular name	Citation	Royal assent
Long title
Defence of the Realm Act 1483 (repealed)	1483 c. 1 (Note: This is the citation in the Record Edition.); 1483 c. 89 (Note: This is the citation in the Duodecimal Edition.)	24 February 1484
Of proclamacioun to the liegis tocum to the king for the defens of the Realme and of wapinschewingis. Of proclamation to the lieges to come to the king for the defence of the Realm and of wapinshaws. (Repealed by Statute Law Revision (Scotland) Act 1906 (6 Edw. 7. c. 38))
Dunbar Castle Act 1483 (repealed)	1483 c. 2 — (Note: This act is not listed in the Duodecimal Edition.)	24 February 1484
Tueching the recovering of the castell of Dunbar. Touching the recovery of the castle of Dunbar. (Repealed by Statute Law Revision (Scotland) Act 1906 (6 Edw. 7. c. 38))
Duke of Albany Act 1483 (repealed)	1483 c. 3 —	24 February 1484
Tueching the personis that ar summound for airt and part and tresonable assistance to Alexander (Note: Alexander Stewart, Duke of Albany.) sum tyme duc of Albany. Touching the persons that are summoned for art and part and treasonous assistance to Alexander, formerly duke of Albany. (Repealed by Statute Law Revision (Scotland) Act 1906 (6 Edw. 7. c. 38))
Circuit Courts Act 1483 (repealed)	1483 c. 4 —	24 February 1484
Of Justice airis to be sett and haldin generally throu the Realme and of wardane Courtis. Of Justice ayres to be set and held generally throughout the Realm and of warden Courts. (Repealed by Statute Law Revision (Scotland) Act 1906 (6 Edw. 7. c. 38))
Remissions Act 1483 (repealed)	1483 c. 5 —	24 February 1484
Aganis the gevin of remissionis or respettis. Against the giving of remissions or respites. (Repealed by Statute Law Revision (Scotland) Act 1906 (6 Edw. 7. c. 38))
King's Rents Act 1483 (repealed)	1483 c. 6; 1483 c. 90	24 February 1484
Tueching the kingis malis rentis and fermez. Touching the king's mails, rents and farms. (Repealed by Statute Law Revision (Scotland) Act 1906 (6 Edw. 7. c. 38))
Attendance at Parliament Act 1483 (repealed)	1483 c. 7 —	24 February 1484
Anent the blame of the estatis and lordis that ar not cumin to this parliament. Regarding the blame of the estates and lortds that are not coming to this parliament. (Repealed by Statute Law Revision (Scotland) Act 1906 (6 Edw. 7. c. 38))
Internal Discords Act 1483 (repealed)	1483 c. 8; 1483 c. 91	24 February 1484
Anent the discordis that standis ymangis our souerane lordis liegis. Regarding the discords that stand amongst our sovereign lord's subjects. (Repealed by Statute Law Revision (Scotland) Act 1906 (6 Edw. 7. c. 38))
Barratry Act 1483 (repealed)	1483 c. 9 —	24 February 1484
Anent Impetraciouns made in the Court of Rome Incontrar oure soverane lordis privilege. Regarding Impetrations made in the Court of Rome in Contradiction to our sovereign lord's privilege. (Repealed by Statute Law Revision (Scotland) Act 1906 (6 Edw. 7. c. 38))
Money and Bullion Act 1483 (repealed)	1483 c. 10; 1483 c. 93	24 February 1484
Of the money and Inbringing of bulloun. Of the money and Importation of bullion. (Repealed by Statute Law Revision (Scotland) Act 1906 (6 Edw. 7. c. 38))
Barratry (No. 2) Act 1483 (repealed)	1483 c. 11 —	24 February 1484
Anent the having of mone furth of the Realme for promocions and pleis in the Court of Rome. Regarding the exporting of money out of the Realm for promotions and pleas in the Court of Rome. (Repealed by Statute Law Revision (Scotland) Act 1906 (6 Edw. 7. c. 38))

=== Sources ===
- Alexander, William (1841). "Acta Parliamentorum Regis Jacobi Tertii". An Abridgement of the Acts of the Parliaments of Scotland. Edinburgh: Adam and Charles Black. p. 445 – via Google Books.
- Alexander, William (1841). "Acta Parliamentorum Regis Jacobi Tertii". An Abridgement of the Acts of the Parliaments of Scotland. Edinburgh: Adam and Charles Black. p. 445 – via Google Books.
- Chronological Table of the Statutes. London: Her Majesty's Stationery Office. 1972. p. 1323 – via Google Books.
- "Index of Statutes: James III (1460-1488)". Records of the Parliaments of Scotland to 1707. University of St Andrews.

== See also ==
- List of legislation in the United Kingdom
- Records of the Parliaments of Scotland
