= List of acts of the Parliament of Scotland from 1609 =

This is a list of acts of the Parliament of Scotland for the year 1609.

It lists acts of Parliament of the old Parliament of Scotland, that was merged with the old Parliament of England to form the Parliament of Great Britain, by the Union with England Act 1707 (c. 7).

For other years, see list of acts of the Parliament of Scotland. For the period after 1707, see list of acts of the Parliament of Great Britain.

== 1609 ==
The 20th parliament of James VI, held in Edinburgh from 12 April 1609 until 24 June 1609.

| Short title, or popular name | Citation | Royal assent |
Long title
| Not public and general | 1609 c. 1 (Note: This is the citation in the Record Edition.) — (Note: This act is not listed in the Duodecimal Edition.) | 17 June 1608 |
Proces upon the summondis of treassoun aganis Johne lord Maxwell.
| Not public and general | 1609 c. 2 — | 24 June 1608 |
Proces and dome of forfaltour aganis Robert Logane of Restalrig.
| Education Act 1609 (repealed) | 1609 c. 3; 1609 c. 1 (Note: This is the citation in the Duodecimal Edition.) | 24 June 1608 |
Act anent the cheising of pedagoges to children passing furth of Scotland to schooles. (Repealed by Statute Law Revision (Scotland) Act 1906 (6 Edw. 7. c. 38))
| Perverts to Papacy Act 1609 (repealed) | 1609 c. 4; 1609 c. 2 | 24 June 1608 |
Act aganis children that becomes papistis when they ar out of Scotland. (Repealed by Statute Law Revision (Scotland) Act 1906 (6 Edw. 7. c. 38))
| Excommunication Act 1609 (repealed) | 1609 c. 5; 1609 c. 3 | 24 June 1608 |
Act anent excommunicat persones nocht to injoy their landis rowmes and possessionis. (Repealed by Statute Law Revision (Scotland) Act 1906 (6 Edw. 7. c. 38))
| Excommunication (No. 2) Act 1609 (repealed) | 1609 c. 6; 1609 c. 4 | 24 June 1608 |
Act anent giveing command to bischoppis to send the names of excommunicatt persones to the thesaurar and to the directour of the chancellarie. (Repealed by Statute Law Revision (Scotland) Act 1906 (6 Edw. 7. c. 38))
| Jesuits Act 1609 (repealed) | 1609 c. 7; 1609 c. 5 | 24 June 1608 |
Act aganis jesuitis seminarie preistis and resettaris of thame. (Repealed by Statute Law Revision (Scotland) Act 1906 (6 Edw. 7. c. 38))
| Commissiariots Act 1609 (repealed) | 1609 c. 8; 1609 c. 6 | 24 June 1608 |
Act of the commissariatis and jurisdictioun gevin to archibischoppis and bischoppes. (Repealed by Statute Law Revision (Scotland) Act 1906 (6 Edw. 7. c. 38))
| Commission on Erections Act 1609 (repealed) | 1609 c. 9 — | 24 June 1608 |
Act placeand Robert erle of Louthiane in the commissioun of the quorum in place of his father for setting doun the Kings blenche dueteis in erectionis and modefeing ministeris stipendis And the bischop of Galloway in place of the bischop of Dunkeld for modefeing ministeris stipendis. (Repealed by Statute Law Revision (Scotland) Act 1906 (6 Edw. 7. c. 38))
| Not public and general | 1609 c. 10 — | 24 June 1608 |
Ratificatioun in favouris of the laird of Cokpule of his infeftment of the baronie of Cokpule and burgh of Ruvale.
| Not public and general | 1609 c. 11 — | 24 June 1608 |
Ratificatioun in favouris of the laird Cokpule of his infeftment of the salmond fischeing on Annane.
| Not public and general | 1609 c. 12 — | 24 June 1608 |
Ratificatioun of the infeftment of Brox mouth to the erle of Dunbar.
| Not public and general | 1609 c. 13 — | 24 June 1608 |
Ratificatioun in favouris of the laird of Spot of his infeftment with reservatioun to the erle of Dunbar.
| Justices of Peace Act 1609 (repealed) | 1609 c. 14; 1609 c. 7 | 24 June 1608 |
Act anent the commissioners and justices of peace. (Repealed by Statute Law Revision (Scotland) Act 1906 (6 Edw. 7. c. 38))
| Sumptuary Act 1609 (repealed) | 1609 c. 15; 1609 c. 8 | 24 June 1608 |
Act of the apparels of judges magistrattis and kirkmen. (Repealed by Statute Law Revision (Scotland) Act 1906 (6 Edw. 7. c. 38))
| Slander Act 1609 (repealed) | 1609 c. 16; 1609 c. 9 | 24 June 1608 |
Act against scandalous speeches and libellis. (Repealed by Statute Law Revision (Scotland) Act 1906 (6 Edw. 7. c. 38))
| Borders Act 1609 (repealed) | 1609 c. 17; 1609 c. 10 | 24 June 1608 |
Act anent fugitive persones of the borders to the in countrey. (Repealed by Statute Law Revision (Scotland) Act 1906 (6 Edw. 7. c. 38))
| Lords of Session Act 1609 (repealed) | 1609 c. 18; 1609 c. 11 | 24 June 1608 |
Act in favouris of the Lordis of Sessioun of ten thowsand poundis to be gevin to them yearlie. (Repealed by Statute Law Revision (Scotland) Act 1906 (6 Edw. 7. c. 38))
| Patronage Act 1609 (repealed) | 1609 c. 19; 1609 c. 12 | 24 June 1608 |
Act anent the patronages of foirfaulted persones. (Repealed by Statute Law Revision (Scotland) Act 1906 (6 Edw. 7. c. 38))
| Gipsies Act 1609 (repealed) | 1609 c. 20; 1609 c. 13 | 24 June 1608 |
Act anent the Egiptians. (Repealed by Statute Law Revision (Scotland) Act 1906 (6 Edw. 7. c. 38))
| Resignations Act 1609 (repealed) | 1609 c. 21; 1609 c. 14 | 24 June 1608 |
Ratificatioun gevin by the King to the secrete counsaill to ressave resignationis. (Repealed by Statute Law Revision (Scotland) Act 1906 (6 Edw. 7. c. 38))
| Hornings Act 1609 (repealed) | 1609 c. 22; 1609 c. 15 | 24 June 1608 |
Act ordenning letteris of hornyng to be direct upoun Admirallis decreittis. (Repealed by Statute Law Revision (Scotland) Act 1964 (c. 80))
| Not public and general | 1609 c. 23 — | 24 June 1608 |
Act for uniting certain kirkis in Annandaill.
| Not public and general | 1609 c. 24 — | 24 June 1608 |
Act anent the castell of Annand.
| Not public and general | 1609 c. 25 — | 24 June 1608 |
Act anent the kirk of Leith.
| Not public and general | 1609 c. 26 — | 24 June 1608 |
Act anent the kirk of Carmylie.
| Not public and general | 1609 c. 27 — | 24 June 1608 |
Act in favouris of the universitie of Sanctandrous.
| Not public and general | 1609 c. 28 — | 24 June 1608 |
Act in favouris of James Maxwell anent the debaitable landis.
| Not public and general | 1609 c. 29 — | 24 June 1608 |
Ratificatioun in favouris of James Max well anent the landis halden be him of the lord Maxwell.
| Not public and general | 1609 c. 30 — | 24 June 1608 |
Ratificatioun in favouris of Johne Murray of Dundranan.
| Not public and general | 1609 c. 31 — | 24 June 1608 |
Act in favouris of the laird of Lugton anent Sanct Leonards hospitall.
| Not public and general | 1609 c. 32 — | 24 June 1608 |
Ratificatioun in favouris of the lord Quhittinghame.
| Not public and general | 1609 c. 33 — | 24 June 1608 |
Annexatioun of the abbacie of Ferne to the bischoprik of Ross.
| Not public and general | 1609 c. 34 — | 24 June 1608 |
Ratificatioun of Kintor to the erle Marschell.
| Not public and general | 1609 c. 35 — | 24 June 1608 |
Act in favouris of the erle of Argyle anent Balrynnis.
| Not public and general | 1609 c. 36 — | 24 June 1608 |
Act in favouris of Mr Johne Layng anent the signet.
| Not public and general | 1609 c. 37 — | 24 June 1608 |
Act in favouris of Sir Johne Arnote Archibald Johnstoun Andro Logane of Coitfeild and Williame Fairlie.
| Not public and general | 1609 c. 38 — | 24 June 1608 |
Ratificatioun of the infeftment of the Byres to the lord advocatt.
| Not public and general | 1609 c. 39 — | 24 June 1608 |
Ratificatioun in favouris of the lord Sanquhar.
| Registers Act 1609 (repealed) | 1609 c. 40 — | 24 June 1608 |
Act anent the abolisheing of the Secretaris register. (Repealed by Statute Law Revision (Scotland) Act 1906 (6 Edw. 7. c. 38))
| Not public and general | 1609 c. 41 — | 24 June 1608 |
Act anent the restitutioun of David Hammyltoun of Bothuelhauch.
| Not public and general | 1609 c. 42 — | 24 June 1608 |
Act in favouris of the lord Maxwellis vassellis.
| Not public and general | 1609 c. 43 — | 24 June 1608 |
Act in favouris of the towne of Perth for bigging of thair brig.
| Not public and general | 1609 c. 44 — | 24 June 1608 |
Ratificatioun to Sir Richard Prestoun of Dingwell.
| Not public and general | 1609 c. 45 — | 24 June 1608 |
Ratificatioun in favouris of Gavin Hammyltoun of landis within Kilwynnyng.
| Saving the Rights Act 1609 Not public and general | 1609 c. 46 — | 24 June 1608 |
Act anent Salvo Jure cujuslibet.
| Submission of Disputes Act 1609 (repealed) | 1609 c. 47 — | 24 June 1608 |
Submissioun betuix the archibischop of Sanctandrous and the lord advocat in the Kingis name. (Repealed by Statute Law Revision (Scotland) Act 1906 (6 Edw. 7. c. 38))
| Rape Act 1609 (repealed) | 1609 c. 48 — | 24 June 1608 |
Commissioun anent the ravissing of wemen. (Repealed by Statute Law Revision (Scotland) Act 1906 (6 Edw. 7. c. 38))
| Not public and general | 1609 c. 49 — | 24 June 1608 |
Act in favouris of the lord Scone of his intromissioun with the Kingis rentis.
| Not public and general | 1609 c. 50 — | 24 June 1608 |
Ratificatioun of ane pensioun to Williame Elphingstounis bairnis.
| Not public and general | 1609 c. 51 — | 24 June 1608 |
Act in favouris of Sir Robert Melvill anent the discharge of the few duetie of Murdocarny.
| Not public and general | 1609 c. 52 — | 24 June 1608 |
Ratificatioun in favouris of the lord of Loudoun of Killismure.
| Not public and general | 1609 c. 53 — | 24 June 1608 |
Act in favouris of the erle off Mortoun.
| Not public and general | 1609 c. 54 — | 24 June 1608 |
Act in favouris of lord Kinloss.
| Not public and general | 1609 c. 55 — | 24 June 1608 |
Erectioun of the abbacie of Melros in ane temporall lordschip in favouris of Johne vicount of Hadingtoun.
| Not public and general | 1609 c. 56 — | 24 June 1608 |
Act in favouris of the lord Saltoun ratifeing his richtis of patronage and takkis of teyndis of the kirkis of Keith and Rothimey.
| Not public and general | 1609 c. 57 — | |
No record of this act is preserved.
| Not public and general | 1609 c. 58 — | |
No record of this act is preserved.
| Not public and general | 1609 c. 59 — | |
No record of this act is preserved.
| Not public and general | 1609 c. 60 — | |
No record of this act is preserved.
| Not public and general | 1609 c. 61 — | |
No record of this act is preserved.
| Not public and general | 1609 c. 62 — | |
No record of this act is preserved.
| Not public and general | 1609 c. 63 — | |
No record of this act is preserved.
| Not public and general | 1609 c. 64 — | |
No record of this act is preserved.

=== Sources ===
- Alexander, William (1841). "Acta Parliamentorum Regis Jacobi Sexti". An Abridgement of the Acts of the Parliaments of Scotland. Edinburgh: Adam and Charles Black. pp. A40 – A41 – via Google Books.
- Alexander, William (1841). "Acta Parliamentorum Regis Jacobi Sexti". An Abridgement of the Acts of the Parliaments of Scotland. Edinburgh: Adam and Charles Black. pp. A40 – A41 – via Google Books.
- Chronological Table of the Statutes. London: Her Majesty's Stationery Office. 1972. pp. 1346–1347 – via Google Books.
- "Index of Statutes: Index of Statutes: James VI (1567-1625)". Records of the Parliaments of Scotland to 1707. University of St Andrews.

== See also ==
- List of legislation in the United Kingdom
- Records of the Parliaments of Scotland
