= List of acts of the Parliament of Scotland from 1585 =

This is a list of acts of the Parliament of Scotland for the year 1585.

It lists acts of Parliament of the old Parliament of Scotland, that was merged with the old Parliament of England to form the Parliament of Great Britain, by the Union with England Act 1707 (c. 7).

For other years, see list of acts of the Parliament of Scotland. For the period after 1707, see list of acts of the Parliament of Great Britain.

== 1585 ==
The 10th parliament of James VI, held in Linlithgow from 1 December 1585.

Short title, or popular name	Citation	Royal assent
Long title
Leasing Making Act 1585 (repealed)	1585 c. 1 (Note: This is the citation in the Record Edition.); 1585 c. 10 (Note: This is the citation in the Duodecimal Edition.)	10 December 1585
Ane act aganis the authouris of slaunde rous spechis or writtis. (Repealed by Statute Law Revision (Scotland) Act 1964 (c. 80))
Execution of Acts of Parliament Act 1585 (repealed)	1585 c. 2 — (Note: This act is not listed in the Duodecimal Edition.)	10 December 1585
Ane act for the better executioun of our soverane lordis lawis and actis of parliament. (Repealed by Statute Law Revision (Scotland) Act 1906 (6 Edw. 7. c. 38))
Fees Act 1585 (repealed)	1585 c. 3 —	10 December 1585
Ane act anent feis of the seillis and chalmer and subscriptioun of the officiaris. (Repealed by Statute Law Revision (Scotland) Act 1906 (6 Edw. 7. c. 38))
College of Justice Act 1585 (repealed)	1585 c. 4 —	10 December 1585
Ane act anent the alteratioun of the tymes of sitting of the college of Justice. (Repealed by Statute Law Revision (Scotland) Act 1906 (6 Edw. 7. c. 38))
Benefices Act 1585 (repealed)	1585 c. 5; 1585 c. 11	10 December 1585
Ane act aganis dilapidatioun of benefices. (Repealed by Statute Law Revision (Scotland) Act 1906 (6 Edw. 7. c. 38))
Leagues Act 1585 (repealed)	1585 c. 6; 1585 c. 12	10 December 1585
Ane act aganis leaguis and bandis. (Repealed by Statute Law Revision (Scotland) Act 1964 (c. 80))
Style of Signatures Act 1585 (repealed)	1585 c. 7; 1585 c. 13	10 December 1585
Ane act for reformatioun of certane abuses in directioun of lettres. (Repealed by Statute Law Revision (Scotland) Act 1906 (6 Edw. 7. c. 38))
Extortions by Keepers of Castles Act 1585 (repealed)	1585 c. 8 —	10 December 1585
Ane act ratefeing the formare act of parliament maid anent discharge of infeftmentis and sowmes of money oblist for deliverie of castellis. (Repealed by Statute Law Revision (Scotland) Act 1906 (6 Edw. 7. c. 38))
Double Poinding Act 1585 (repealed)	1585 c. 9; 1585 c. 19	10 December 1585
Ane act interpreting the act of parliament maid of befoir anent dowble poyndingis. (Repealed by Statute Law Revision (Scotland) Act 1906 (6 Edw. 7. c. 38))
Privy Council Act 1585 (repealed)	1585 c. 10 —	10 December 1585
Ane act for establishing of the Kingis Majesties previe counsall. (Repealed by Statute Law Revision (Scotland) Act 1906 (6 Edw. 7. c. 38))
Burghs Act 1585 (repealed)	1585 c. 11; 1585 c. 14	10 December 1585
Ane act in favouris of the burrowis anent the paking and peling of fisches. (Repealed by Statute Law Revision (Scotland) Act 1906 (6 Edw. 7. c. 38))
Prohibited Exports Act 1585 (repealed)	1585 c. 12; 1585 c. 15	10 December 1585
Ane act anent transporting of forbiddin guidis. An act regarding transporting forbidden goods. (Repealed by Statute Law Revision (Scotland) Act 1906 (6 Edw. 7. c. 38))
Thieves Act 1585 (repealed)	1585 c. 13; 1585 c. 16	10 December 1585
Additioun to the act anent thevis and soirneris of clannis. (Repealed by Statute Law Revision (Scotland) Act 1906 (6 Edw. 7. c. 38))
Factors and Tenants Act 1585 (repealed)	1585 c. 14 —	10 December 1585
Ane act in favour of the tennentis quha hes maid payment to factouris. (Repealed by Statute Law Revision (Scotland) Act 1906 (6 Edw. 7. c. 38))
Church Lands Act 1585 (repealed)	1585 c. 15 —	10 December 1585
That the act of Parliament laitlie maid anent the confirmatioun of fewis of kirkland sall not prescrive aganis minoris for the space of ane yeir heireftir. (Repealed by Statute Law Revision (Scotland) Act 1906 (6 Edw. 7. c. 38))
Signatures Act 1585 (repealed)	1585 c. 16; 1585 c. 20	10 December 1585
That all lettres be presentit to be subscrivit be the kingis majestie and be the ordinar officiaris. (Repealed by Statute Law Revision (Scotland) Act 1906 (6 Edw. 7. c. 38))
Chancellor Act 1585 (repealed)	1585 c. 17 —	10 December 1585
Anent the office of chancellarie. (Repealed by Statute Law Revision (Scotland) Act 1906 (6 Edw. 7. c. 38))
Treaty with England Act 1585 (repealed)	1585 c. 18 —	10 December 1585
Ratificatioun of the assent of the estaitis for treating and concluding of a league with the quene of England. (Repealed by Statute Law Revision (Scotland) Act 1906 (6 Edw. 7. c. 38))
Forfeited Persons Act 1585 (repealed)	1585 c. 19 —	10 December 1585
Licence gevin to the advocatis to treat and consult with the personis foirfaltit anent thair restitutioun. (Repealed by Statute Law Revision (Scotland) Act 1906 (6 Edw. 7. c. 38))
King's Revocation Act 1585 (repealed)	1585 c. 20; 1585 c. 17	10 December 1585
The kingis Majesties revocatioun of his hienes propertie the lord Dingwell erle of Orknay and Williame Murray exceptit. (Repealed by Statute Law Revision (Scotland) Act 1906 (6 Edw. 7. c. 38))
Not public and general	1585 c. 21 —	10 December 1585
Actis of the restitutioun of the noblemen and utheris ressavit to the kingis majesties favour and abolitioun of the force of processis of foirfaltour and uther materis concerning thame.
Not public and general	1585 c. 22 —	10 December 1585
Ane exceptioun for my lord justice clerk anent the landis of Wodhouslie.
Not public and general	1585 c. 23 —	10 December 1585
Ane act in favoure of Johnne erll of Mortoun his freindis and servandis.
Ministers and Schoolmasters Act 1585 (repealed)	1585 c. 24 —	10 December 1585
Act for repossessioun of ministaris and maisteris of collegis and scuilis. (Repealed by Statute Law Revision (Scotland) Act 1906 (6 Edw. 7. c. 38))
Curators Act 1585 (repealed)	1585 c. 25; 1585 c. 18	10 December 1585
Declaratioun of the lord Hamiltoun To be curatour to the erle of arrane his brother. (Repealed by Adults with Incapacity (Scotland) Act 2000 (asp 4))
Not public and general	1585 c. 26 —	10 December 1585
The benefite of the pacificatioun grantit to the lord Claude Hamiltoun and certane his friendis and servandis with ane exceptioun of William Sinclair.
Not public and general	1585 c. 27 —	10 December 1585
Rehabilitatioun grantit to the bairnis naturall of umquhile James sumtyme erll of Mortoun.
Not public and general	1585 c. 28 —	10 December 1585
Act in favouris of the erll of Angus anent the airis of Quhitlaw.
Not public and general	1585 c. 29 —	10 December 1585
Act in favour of the toun of Dumfries.
Not public and general	1585 c. 30 —	10 December 1585
Act in favour of Maister William Leslie.
Not public and general	1585 c. 31 —	10 December 1585
Act in favour of the posteritie of William erll of Gowrie.
Not public and general	1585 c. 32 —	10 December 1585
Ratificatioun grantit to James Richartsoune of Smitone.
Not public and general	1585 c. 33 —	10 December 1585
Ratificatioun of the laird of Elphingstoun.
Not public and general	1585 c. 34 —	10 December 1585
Ratificatioun grantit to the laird of Carmychell.
Not public and general	1585 c. 35 —	10 December 1585
Act in favour of Johnne Achesoun.
Not public and general	1585 c. 36 —	10 December 1585
Ratificatioun of the capitanrie of the castell of Dunbartane to my lord Hammiltoun.
Not public and general	1585 c. 37 —	10 December 1585
Ratificatioun of the capitanrie of the castell of Edinburgh to the laird of Coldinknowis.
Not public and general	1585 c. 38 —	10 December 1585
Act in favour of Schir Williame Stewart lait capitane of Dunbartane.
Not public and general	1585 c. 39 —	10 December 1585
Act in favour of the lord Glammis.
Not public and general	1585 c. 40 —	10 December 1585
Ane act in favour of the maister of Glammis.
Not public and general	1585 c. 41 —	10 December 1585
Act in favour of Johnne Lyoun of Cossynnis.
Not public and general	1585 c. 42 —	10 December 1585
Ane act in favour of the servandis of the erll of Mar and maister of Glammis.
Not public and general	1585 c. 43 —	10 December 1585
Ratificatioun of the restitutioun grantit to Gawin Hammyltoun of Roploch.
Not public and general	1585 c. 44 —	10 December 1585
Act in favour of Johnne lord Hammyl toun and Claud commendatour of Paislay.
Not public and general	1585 c. 45 —	10 December 1585
Act grantit to the laird of Holmendis and his freindis.
Not public and general	1585 c. 46 —	10 December 1585
Ratificatioun of the erll Bothuillis infeftment.
Not public and general	1585 c. 47 —	10 December 1585
Ratificatioun of ane lettre of tak to the laird of Largo comptroller.
Not public and general	1585 c. 48 —	10 December 1585
Ratificatioun grantit to the erll of Huntly of his office of lieutennandrie.
Not public and general	1585 c. 49 —	10 December 1585
Ratificatioun in favour of the bairnis of the laird of Segy.
Not public and general	1585 c. 50 —	10 December 1585
Ratificatioun in favour of Alexander Wod.
Not public and general	1585 c. 51 —	10 December 1585
Ratificatioun to the maister of Gray of the abbay of Dumfermling.
Not public and general	1585 c. 52 —	10 December 1585
Ratificatioun to Waltir Dundas.
Not public and general	1585 c. 53 —	10 December 1585
Ratificatioun grantit to William commendatour of Pettinweyme.
Not public and general	1585 c. 54 —	10 December 1585
Act in favour of Schir Johnne Maitland of Thirlstane secretair to our soverane lord and James Maitland his brothir sone.
Not public and general	1585 c. 55 —	10 December 1585
Ratificatioun of the act of Parliament maid in favouris of Schir James Balfouris wyff and bairnis.
Not public and general	1585 c. 56 —	10 December 1585
Ane act annulland the infeftmentis maid to Gilbert Lauder of Balbardeis and his sone of the landis and leving of Haltoun.
Not public and general	1585 c. 57 —	10 December 1585
Ratificatioun of the office of thesaurarie to Thomas maister of Glammis.
Not public and general	1585 c. 58 —	10 December 1585
Ratificatioun of the provestrie of Lynclouden to William Douglas.
Not public and general	1585 c. 59 —	10 December 1585
Ratificatioun to M^{r} Edward Bruce of the abbacie of Kinlos.
Not public and general	1585 c. 60 —	10 December 1585
Act in favouris of Johnne Hammyltoun of Drumry.
Not public and general	1585 c. 61 —	10 December 1585
Revocatioun anent the landis of Almernes to William Douglas of Drumlanrig.
Not public and general	1585 c. 62 —	10 December 1585
Ratificatioun of the landis of Ormstoun to the laird of Cesfurde.
Not public and general	1585 c. 63 —	10 December 1585
Exceptioun of James Murray of Pardowis pensioun from revocatioun.
Not public and general	1585 c. 64 —	10 December 1585
Ratificatioun of the benefite of pacificatioun to Patrik bischope of Murray.
Not public and general	1585 c. 65 —	10 December 1585
Ratificatioun of the pensionis of George and Andro Halyburtonis.
Not public and general	1585 c. 66 —	10 December 1585
Act in favouris of Adame Hepburne of Bonhard.
Not public and general	1585 c. 67 —	10 December 1585
Ratificatioun of ane pensioun in favour of the archiebischope of Sanctandrois.
Not public and general	1585 c. 68 —	10 December 1585
Ratificatioun of ane pensioun to Johnne Auchinlek.
Not public and general	1585 c. 69 —	10 December 1585
Ratificatioun in favour of M^{r} George Young and Johne Andro.
Not public and general	1585 c. 70 —	10 December 1585
Act in favour of Frances erll of Errole.
Not public and general	1585 c. 71 —	10 December 1585
Ratificatioun of the toun of Anstruther in frie burgh.
Not public and general	1585 c. 72 —	10 December 1585
Act in favouris of James Murray and the lady Polmais.
Not public and general	1585 c. 73 —	10 December 1585
Ane act concerning the lady Lamyngtoun.
Commissioners of the Shires Act 1585 (repealed)	1585 c. 74 —	10 December 1585
Anent commissionaris of the schyres to be send to the Parliament. (Repealed by Statute Law Revision (Scotland) Act 1906 (6 Edw. 7. c. 38))

=== Sources ===
- Alexander, William (1841). "Acta Parliamentorum Regis Jacobi Sexti". An Abridgement of the Acts of the Parliaments of Scotland. Edinburgh: Adam and Charles Black. pp. A28 – A29 – via Google Books.
- Alexander, William (1841). "Acta Parliamentorum Regis Jacobi Sexti". An Abridgement of the Acts of the Parliaments of Scotland. Edinburgh: Adam and Charles Black. pp. A28 – A29 – via Google Books.
- Chronological Table of the Statutes. London: Her Majesty's Stationery Office. 1972. p. 1339 – via Google Books.
- "Acts of the Old Scottish Parliament: 1585". legislation.gov.uk. The National Archives.
- "Index of Statutes: James VI (1567-1625)". Records of the Parliaments of Scotland to 1707. University of St Andrews.

== See also ==
- List of legislation in the United Kingdom
- Records of the Parliaments of Scotland
