= List of acts of the Parliament of Scotland from 1543 =

This is a list of acts of the Parliament of Scotland for the year 1543.

It lists acts of Parliament of the old Parliament of Scotland, that was merged with the old Parliament of England to form the Parliament of Great Britain, by the Union with England Act 1707 (c. 7).

For other years, see list of acts of the Parliament of Scotland. For the period after 1707, see list of acts of the Parliament of Great Britain.

== 1543 ==
The 2nd parliament of Mary.

Short title, or popular name	Citation	Royal assent
Long title
Services to Queen Act 1543 (repealed)	1543 c. 1 (Note: This is the citation in the Record Edition.) — (Note: This act is not listed in the Duodecimal Edition.)	9 December 1543
Act in favouris of thame that come to Striveling and Linlithqw for furth bringing of the quenis grace to the palice of the samyn. Act in favour of those that came to Stirling and Linlithgow for upholding the queen's grace to the palace of the same. (Repealed by Statute Law Revision (Scotland) Act 1906 (6 Edw. 7. c. 38))
Expiry of Treaty with England Act 1543 (repealed)	1543 c. 2 —	9 December 1543
Declaratioun of the expiry of the pece and contract of meriage (Note: Treaty of Greenwich.) laitlie maid with the king of Ingland. (Note: Henry VIII.); Declaration of the expiry of the peace and contract of marriage lately made with the king of England. (Repealed by Statute Law Revision (Scotland) Act 1906 (6 Edw. 7. c. 38))
Treaty with France Act 1543 (repealed)	1543 c. 3 —	9 December 1543
Anent the renewal of the ancient considerationis of amite with the kingis of France. Regarding the renewal of the ancient consideration of amity with the kings of France. (Repealed by Statute Law Revision (Scotland) Act 1906 (6 Edw. 7. c. 38))
Great Council Act 1543 (repealed)	1543 c. 4 —	9 December 1543
Anent ane gret consale to be chosyn to tret the gret materis of the realm. Regarding a great council to be chosen to treat the great matters of the realm. (Repealed by Statute Law Revision (Scotland) Act 1906 (6 Edw. 7. c. 38))
Not public and general	1543 c. 5 —	9 December 1543
Exoneracioun of William erle of Montros (Note: William Graham, 2nd Earl of Montrose.) and Jhone lord Erskin (Note: John Erskine, 5th Lord Erskine.) of all chargis of this realm during the tyme of thair remanyng with the quenis grace. Exoneration of William, earl of Montrose and John, lord Erskine from all charges of this realm during the time of their remaining with the queen's grace.
Heresy Act 1543 (repealed)	1543 c. 6 —	15 December 1543
Aganis heretikis and thar dampnable opinionis incontrar the fayth and lawis of halykirk. Against heretics and their damnable opinions contrary to the faith and laws of the holy church. (Repealed by Statute Law Revision (Scotland) Act 1906 (6 Edw. 7. c. 38))
College of Justice Act 1543 (repealed)	1543 c. 7; 1543 c. 1 (Note: This is the citation in the Duodecimal Edition.)	15 December 1543
Ratificatioun of the institutioun of the college of Justice. Ratification of the institution of the college of Justice. (Repealed by Statute Law Revision (Scotland) Act 1906 (6 Edw. 7. c. 38))
Publication of Acts Act 1543 (repealed)	1543 c. 8 —	15 December 1543
Certane actis befor writtin red publist and pronuncit. Certain acts previously written, read published and pronounced. (Repealed by Statute Law Revision (Scotland) Act 1906 (6 Edw. 7. c. 38))
Not public and general	1543 c. 9 —	15 December 1543
Ratificatioun of ane mandat be the abbot (Note: Alexander Hamilton, Abbot of Kilwinning.) and convent of Kilwynnyng grantand ane pensioun furth of the vicarage of Dunlop (Note: Dunlop, East Ayrshire.) to the seit of Sessioun and college of Justice. Ratification of a mandate by the abbot and convent of Kilwinning, granting a pension from the vicarage of Dunlop to the seat of Session and college of Justice.

=== Sources ===
- Alexander, William (1841). "Acta Parliamentorum Mariæ Reginæ". An Abridgement of the Acts of the Parliaments of Scotland. Edinburgh: Adam and Charles Black. p. A17 – via Google Books.
- Alexander, William (1841). "Acta Parliamentorum Mariæ Reginæ". An Abridgement of the Acts of the Parliaments of Scotland. Edinburgh: Adam and Charles Black. p. A17 – via Google Books.
- Chronological Table of the Statutes. London: Her Majesty's Stationery Office. 1972. p. 1331 – via Google Books.
- "Index of Statutes: Mary I (1542-1567)". Records of the Parliaments of Scotland to 1707. University of St Andrews.

== See also ==
- List of legislation in the United Kingdom
- Records of the Parliaments of Scotland
