= List of acts of the Parliament of Scotland from 1612 =

This is a list of acts of the Parliament of Scotland for the year 1612.

It lists acts of Parliament of the old Parliament of Scotland, that was merged with the old Parliament of England to form the Parliament of Great Britain, by the Union with England Act 1707 (c. 7).

For other years, see list of acts of the Parliament of Scotland. For the period after 1707, see list of acts of the Parliament of Great Britain.

== 1612 ==
The 21st parliament of James VI, held in Edinburgh from 12 October 1612.

Short title, or popular name	Citation	Royal assent
Long title
Acts of Assembly Act 1612 (repealed)	1612 c. 1 (Note: This is the citation in the Record Edition.); 1612 c. 1 (Note: This is the citation in the Duodecimal Edition.)	23 October 1612
A ratificatioun of the acts and conclusionis set downe and agreed upoun in the generall assemblie of the kirk kepit in Glasgow in the moneth of June 1610 togither with ane explanatioun made by the Estates of some of the articles of the same. (Repealed by Confession of Faith Ratification Act 1690 (c. 7))
Extradition with England Act 1612 (repealed)	1612 c. 2; 1612 c. 2	23 October 1612
Ane act for remanding back to his Majesties officiares of justice in England of offendours in some particular crymes in the act mentioned who efter the commit ting of the offence in England salbe thairupoun fugitive and remane in this kingdome. (Repealed by Statute Law Revision (Scotland) Act 1906 (6 Edw. 7. c. 38))
Hornings in case of Murder Act 1612 (repealed)	1612 c. 3; 1612 c. 3	23 October 1612
Ane act declaring that in all tyme heirefter the objecting of hornyng for a civile cause of the partie ayther slane or mutilat salbe no liberatioun of the offender frome the punischment dew of the law. (Repealed by Statute Law Revision (Scotland) Act 1906 (6 Edw. 7. c. 38))
Rape Act 1612 (repealed)	1612 c. 4; 1612 c. 4	23 October 1612
Ane act aganis ravischers of wemen. (Repealed by Statute Law Revision (Scotland) Act 1906 (6 Edw. 7. c. 38))
Teinds Act 1612 (repealed)	1612 c. 5; 1612 c. 5	23 October 1612
Ane act anent more tymous teynding ffor the ease of the laborers of the ground. (Repealed by Statute Law Revision (Scotland) Act 1906 (6 Edw. 7. c. 38))
Borders Act 1612 (repealed)	1612 c. 6; 1612 c. 6	23 October 1612
Ane act for discharge of all persute aganis any within the boundis of the lait borders for causes preceding his Majesties going to England with exception nottheles of all decretis recoverit and with reservatioun of the criminall persute at the instance of his Majesties officiars. (Repealed by Statute Law Revision (Scotland) Act 1906 (6 Edw. 7. c. 38))
Hornings Act 1612 (repealed)	1612 c. 7; 1612 c. 7	23 October 1612
Ane act allowing hornyng upon ane sympill charge of fyftene dayes to be direct upoun Commissars decretis. (Repealed by Statute Law Revision (Scotland) Act 1964 (c. 80))
Bishops' Manses Act 1612 (repealed)	1612 c. 8; 1612 c. 8	23 October 1612
Ane act anent reparing of bischops manses. (Repealed by Statute Law Revision (Scotland) Act 1906 (6 Edw. 7. c. 38))
Pardons Act 1612 (repealed)	1612 c. 9; 1612 c. 9	23 October 1612
Ane act pardonyng the bypast escaips of some pœnall statuts thairin mentioned. (Repealed by Statute Law Revision (Scotland) Act 1906 (6 Edw. 7. c. 38))
Not public and general	1612 c. 10; 1612 c. 10	23 October 1612
Ratificatioun of the Quenis Majesties infeftment of Dunfermling.
Saving the Rights Act 1612 Not public and general	1612 c. 11; 1612 c. 11	23 October 1612
Ane act declaring that all ratificationes past in this Parliament are no utherwyse exped bot Salvo Jure cujuslibet.
Supply Act 1612 (repealed)	1612 c. 12; 1612 c. 2	23 October 1612
Ane act concerning the voluntar offer of ane taxatioun maid be the Estaittis of Parliament to his Majestie. (Repealed by Statute Law Revision (Scotland) Act 1906 (6 Edw. 7. c. 38))
Supply (No. 2) Act 1612 (repealed)	1612 c. 13; 1612 c. 2	23 October 1612
Act anent the forme and order of the up lifting of the said taxatioun. (Repealed by Statute Law Revision (Scotland) Act 1906 (6 Edw. 7. c. 38))
Not public and general	1612 c. 14 — (Note: This act is not listed in the Duodecimal Edition.)	23 October 1612
Ratificatioun of the contract betuix his Majestie and Sir Johnne Arnot anent Orknay.
Not public and general	1612 c. 15 —	23 October 1612
Annexatioun of the landis of Orknay the crowne.
Bishop's Lands in Orkney Act 1612 (repealed)	1612 c. 16 —	23 October 1612
Commissioun for dealing betuix his Majestie and the bischop of Orknay (Note: James Law, Bishop of Orkney.) for the bischops landis in Orknay. Commission for dealing between his Majesty and the bishop of Orkney, for the bishop's lands in Orkney. (Repealed by Statute Law Revision (Scotland) Act 1906 (6 Edw. 7. c. 38))
Not public and general	1612 c. 17 —	23 October 1612
Ratificatioun in favouris of the burgh of Dumbertane off thair infeftment.
Not public and general	1612 c. 18 —	23 October 1612
Ratificatioun in favours of the burgh of Glasgow off thair infeftment.
Not public and general	1612 c. 19 —	23 October 1612
Ratificatioun in favours of Sir Thomas Hammyltoun of Byris knycht secretar to his Majestie.
Not public and general	1612 c. 20 —	23 October 1612
Ratificatioun in favouris of Sir James Douglas of Spott.
Not public and general	1612 c. 21 —	23 October 1612
Ratificatioun in favouris of Robert lord Lyndesay.
Not public and general	1612 c. 22 —	23 October 1612
Ratificatioun in favours of Henrye Wardlaw of Balmule.
Not public and general	1612 c. 23 —	23 October 1612
Ratificatioun in favours of Sir Jedeon Murray of Elibank knycht.
Mint Act 1612 (repealed)	1612 c. 24 —	23 October 1612
Ratificatioun in favours of the officiars the cunzehouse. Ratification in favour of the officers of the mint-house. (Repealed by Statute Law Revision (Scotland) Act 1906 (6 Edw. 7. c. 38))
Not public and general	1612 c. 25 —	23 October 1612
Ratificatioun in favours of Maister Thomas Hoip advocat.
Not public and general	1612 c. 26 —	23 October 1612
Ratificatioun in favours of Walter lord Scott of Bukcleuch.
Not public and general	1612 c. 27 —	23 October 1612
Act for translating of the kirk of Gulane to Dirltoun.
Not public and general	1612 c. 28 —	23 October 1612
Ratificatioun in favouris of Thomas vicount Fentoun lord Dirltoun.
Not public and general	1612 c. 29 —	23 October 1612
Ratificatioun in favours of Alexander Stewart lord of Garleis.
Not public and general	1612 c. 30 —	23 October 1612
Ratificatioun in favors of Sir William Olyphant of Newtoun knycht advocat to his hienes.
Not public and general	1612 c. 31 —	23 October 1612
Ratificatioun of the said Sir William Olyphantis gift of advocatrie.
Not public and general	1612 c. 32 —	23 October 1612
Ratificatioun in favouris of Patrik Mauld of Panmure.
Not public and general	1612 c. 33 —	23 October 1612
Ratificatioun in favouris of Sir Ritchard Cokburne of Clerkingtoun.
Not public and general	1612 c. 34 —	23 October 1612
Ratificatioun of the letter of pensioun grantit be his hienes to George and James Prestounes sonnes to Maister Johnne Prestoun præsident.
Not public and general	1612 c. 35 —	23 October 1612
Dissolutioun of the archedeanrie of Sanctandrois and annexatioun of the same to the bischoprik thairof.
Not public and general	1612 c. 36 —	23 October 1612
Ratificatioun in favouris of Johnne Murray grome in his Majesties bedchalmer.
Not public and general	1612 c. 37 —	23 October 1612
Ratificatioun of Johnne Auchmowties renunciatioun of his richt of the castell of Sanctandrois.
Not public and general	1612 c. 38 —	23 October 1612
Ratificatioun in favours of Sanct Leonardis College of the landis belonging to the patrimonie thairof.
Not public and general	1612 c. 39 —	23 October 1612
Ratificatioun to the duke of Lennox of the office of Admiralitie and privilegis of the same.
Not public and general	1612 c. 40 —	23 October 1612
Exoneratioun to the erll of Ergile off his commissioun to Ilay.
Not public and general	1612 c. 41 —	23 October 1612
Ratificatioun in favours of the erll of King horne.
Not public and general	1612 c. 42 —	23 October 1612
Act for changeing the mercat day of Glammys.
Not public and general	1612 c. 43 —	23 October 1612
Ratificatioun in favours of Sir James Dundas.
Not public and general	1612 c. 44 —	23 October 1612
Ratificatioun in favouris of Alexander Moncreif.
Not public and general	1612 c. 45 —	23 October 1612
Act in favouris of the heiris of umquhill William Nesbit of Newtoun Leyis against the executouris of the laird of Restalrig.
Not public and general	1612 c. 46 —	23 October 1612
Act anent the kirk of Craling declaring the same to be ane paroche kirk.
Burghs Act 1612 (repealed)	1612 c. 47 —	23 October 1612
General ratificatioun of the burrowis liberties. General ratification of the burghs' liberties. (Repealed by Statute Law Revision (Scotland) Act 1906 (6 Edw. 7. c. 38))
Not public and general	1612 c. 48 —	23 October 1612
Ratificatioun in favouris of the burgh of Tayne of thair infeftment.
Not public and general	1612 c. 49 —	23 October 1612
Ratificatioun in favouris of Maister Josua Durie of his pensioun.
Not public and general	1612 c. 50 —	23 October 1612
Ratificatioun to the laird of Auldbar of his infeftment of the patronage of the kirk of Rescobie.
Not public and general	1612 c. 51 —	23 October 1612
Ratificatioun to Patrik Dowglas of his infeftment of the landis of Kilspindie and Abirladie with the teyndis thairof.
Not public and general	1612 c. 52 —	23 October 1612
Ratificatioun to the duke of Lennox of his pensioun furth of the propirtie.
Not public and general	1612 c. 53 —	23 October 1612
Ratificatioun to the duke of Lennox of the dukedome of Lennox and regalitie thairof.
Not public and general	1612 c. 54 —	23 October 1612
Ratificatioun in favouris of Williame Nisbit of his infeftment of the Deane and Pultre Land.
Not public and general	1612 c. 55 —	23 October 1612
Ratificatioun to the laird of Lie of his infeftment of the baronie of Lie.
Not public and general	1612 c. 56 —	23 October 1612
Ratificatioun to the laird of Dundas of the patronage of the kirk of Levingstoun.
Not public and general	1612 c. 57 —	23 October 1612
Ratificatioun to the laird of Balmowto of his infeftment of the landis of Balmowto and patronage of the kirk of Auchtertule.
Not public and general	1612 c. 58 —	23 October 1612
Ratificatioun to Sir George Hay of his infeftment of the landis of Kincapill.
Not public and general	1612 c. 59 —	23 October 1612
Ratificatioun to Sir George Hay of his gift and privilege of making of yron and glas-workis.
Not public and general	1612 c. 60 —	23 October 1612
Ratificatioun to Archibald Prymroiss of his licence of making of yrne within the schirefdome of Perth.
Not public and general	1612 c. 61 —	23 October 1612
Ratificatioun of George and Andro Halyburtounes pensioun of fyve hundreth pundis.
Not public and general	1612 c. 62 —	23 October 1612
Ratificatioun of the contract betuix the archiebischop of Sanctandrois and the citie of Sanctandrois with a reservatioun in favouris of the lord Lyndesay.
Not public and general	1612 c. 63 —	23 October 1612
Ratification to the lord Keith of his infeftment of the lordschippis of Dunnoter and Inverrugie.
Not public and general	1612 c. 64 —	23 October 1612
Act in favours of the lord Burghlie.
Not public and general	1612 c. 65 —	
No record of this act is preserved.
Not public and general	1612 c. 66 —	
No record of this act is preserved.
Not public and general	1612 c. 67 —	
No record of this act is preserved.
Not public and general	1612 c. 68 —	
No record of this act is preserved.
Not public and general	1612 c. 69 —	
No record of this act is preserved.
Not public and general	1612 c. 70 —	
No record of this act is preserved.
Not public and general	1612 c. 71 —	
No record of this act is preserved.
Not public and general	1612 c. 72 —	
No record of this act is preserved.
Not public and general	1612 c. 73 —	
No record of this act is preserved.
Not public and general	1612 c. 74 —	
No record of this act is preserved.
Not public and general	1612 c. 75 —	
No record of this act is preserved.

=== Sources ===
- Alexander, William (1841). "Acta Parliamentorum Regis Jacobi Sexti". An Abridgement of the Acts of the Parliaments of Scotland. Edinburgh: Adam and Charles Black. pp. A41 – A43 – via Google Books.
- Alexander, William (1841). "Acta Parliamentorum Regis Jacobi Sexti". An Abridgement of the Acts of the Parliaments of Scotland. Edinburgh: Adam and Charles Black. pp. A41 – A43 – via Google Books.
- Chronological Table of the Statutes. London: Her Majesty's Stationery Office. 1972. p. 1347 – via Google Books.
- "Index of Statutes: Index of Statutes: James VI (1567-1625)". Records of the Parliaments of Scotland to 1707. University of St Andrews.

== See also ==
- List of legislation in the United Kingdom
- Records of the Parliaments of Scotland
