= List of acts of the Parliament of Scotland from 1488 =

This is a list of acts of the Parliament of Scotland for the year 1488.

It lists acts of Parliament of the old Parliament of Scotland, that was merged with the old Parliament of England to form the Parliament of Great Britain, by the Union with England Act 1707 (c. 7).

For other years, see list of acts of the Parliament of Scotland. For the period after 1707, see list of acts of the Parliament of Great Britain.

== 1488 ==
=== October ===
The 1st parliament of James IV.

Short title, or popular name	Citation	Royal assent
Long title
Church Act 1488 (repealed)	October 1488 c. 1 (Note: This is the citation in the Record Edition.) — (Note: This act is not listed in the Duodecimal Edition.)	17 October 1488
Of the halykirk. Of the holy church. (Repealed by Statute Law Revision (Scotland) Act 1906 (6 Edw. 7. c. 38))
Royal Marriage Act 1488 (repealed)	October 1488 c. 2 —	17 October 1488
Of oure soverane lordis mariage and a contribucioun for an ambaxiate to be send thairupon. Of our sovereign lord's marriage and a contribution for an embassy to be sent thereupon. (Repealed by Statute Law Revision (Scotland) Act 1906 (6 Edw. 7. c. 38))
France Act 1488 (repealed)	October 1488 c. 3 —	17 October 1488
Of a commissioun to renew the confideracioun betuix the realmez of France and Scotland. Of a commission to renew the confederation between the realms of France and Scotland. (Repealed by Statute Law Revision (Scotland) Act 1906 (6 Edw. 7. c. 38))
Goods of Rebels Act 1488 (repealed)	October 1488 c. 4 —	17 October 1488
Anent the gudis landis and housis takyne befor the feild of Sterviling be lordis and personis that war with our soverane lord that now is. About the goods, lands and houses taken before the battle of Stirling by lords and persons who were with our sovereign lord that now is. (Repealed by Statute Law Revision (Scotland) Act 1906 (6 Edw. 7. c. 38))
Goods of Burgesses and Merchants Act 1488 (repealed)	October 1488 c. 5 —	17 October 1488
Anent gudis takin fra burgessis and merchandmen sen the tyme of the feild of Sterviling and of a generale remissioun to thaim. About goods taken from burgesses and merchants after the time of the battle of Sterling and of a general remission to them. (Repealed by Statute Law Revision (Scotland) Act 1906 (6 Edw. 7. c. 38))
Rebel Officers of Law Act 1488 (repealed)	October 1488 c. 6 —	17 October 1488
Of wardanis Justicis and uthir officiaris quhilkis wer in feild at Sterviling agane oure soverane lord—to be secludit and suspendit fra the saidis officis. Of wardens, Justices and other officials who were in battle at Sterling against our sovereign lord; to be debarred and suspended from the said offices. (Repealed by Statute Law Revision (Scotland) Act 1906 (6 Edw. 7. c. 38))
Heirs of Rebels Act 1488 (repealed)	October 1488 c. 7 —	17 October 1488
Anent the entre of the aieris of thame that deit in the feild agane our Soverane lord. About the entry of the heirs of those that died in battle against our Sovereign lord. (Repealed by Statute Law Revision (Scotland) Act 1906 (6 Edw. 7. c. 38))
Administration of Justice Act 1488 (repealed)	October 1488 c. 8 —	17 October 1488
Anent the furth putting of Justice throw all the realme. Regarding the exercise of justice throughout the realm. (Repealed by Statute Law Revision (Scotland) Act 1906 (6 Edw. 7. c. 38))
Crime Act 1488 (repealed)	October 1488 c. 9 —	17 October 1488
Anent the stanching of thift reff and utheris innormitez. Regarding the stopping of theft, robbery and other extreme wickedness. (Repealed by Statute Law Revision (Scotland) Act 1906 (6 Edw. 7. c. 38))
Burgh Jurisdiction Act 1488 (repealed)	October 1488 c. 10; 1488 c. 1 (Note: This is the citation in the Duodecimal Edition.)	17 October 1488
Anent the replegeing of the inhabitantis of burrowis fra the Justicis. About the repledging of the inhabitants of the burghs from the justice. (Repealed by Statute Law Revision (Scotland) Act 1906 (6 Edw. 7. c. 38))
Coin and Bullion Act 1488 (repealed)	October 1488 c. 11; 1488 c. 2	17 October 1488
Anent the cunye and bulyoun. About the coiners and bullion. (Repealed by Statute Law Revision (Scotland) Act 1906 (6 Edw. 7. c. 38))
Shipping Act 1488 (repealed)	October 1488 c. 12; 1488 c. 3	17 October 1488
That all schippis cum to fre burrowis. That all ships come to free burghs. (Repealed by Statute Law Revision (Scotland) Act 1906 (6 Edw. 7. c. 38))
Barratry Act 1488 (repealed)	October 1488 c. 13 —	17 October 1488
Anent clerkis quhilkis purchessis beneficis in the court of Rome quhilkis wes never thairat of befor. About clerks which purchased benefices in the court of Rome that were never there before. (Repealed by Statute Law Revision (Scotland) Act 1906 (6 Edw. 7. c. 38))
Barratry (No. 2) Act 1488 (repealed)	October 1488 c. 14; 1488 c. 4	17 October 1488
Anent clerkis that purchessis beneficez in the court of Rome of the quhilkis the presentacioun pertenis to his hienes the sege vacand. About clerks that purchase benefices in the court of Rome, for which the presentation pertained to his highness, during vacancy of a see. (Repealed by Statute Law Revision (Scotland) Act 1906 (6 Edw. 7. c. 38))
King's Death Act 1488 (repealed)	October 1488 c. 15 —	17 October 1488
Of the debaite and cause of the feild of Stervilin in the quhilk umquhile James king of Scotlande happinit to be slane and the caus and occasioun tharof. Of the debate and cause of the battle of Stirling in which the late James, king of Scotland, happened to be slain and the cause and occasion thereof. (Repealed by Statute Law Revision (Scotland) Act 1906 (6 Edw. 7. c. 38))
Salmon Act 1488 (repealed)	October 1488 c. 16 —	17 October 1488
Of cruffis and fisch dammys. Of cruives and fish dams. (Repealed by Statute Law Revision (Scotland) Act 1906 (6 Edw. 7. c. 38))
Edinburgh Castle Act 1488 (repealed)	October 1488 c. 17 —	17 October 1488
Of the keping of the castell of Edinburgh and governance of my lord James duk of Ros. (Note: James Stewart, Duke of Ross.); Of the keeping of the castle of Edinburgh, and governance of my lord James, Duke of Ross. (Repealed by Statute Law Revision (Scotland) Act 1906 (6 Edw. 7. c. 38))
Dunbar Castle Act 1488 (repealed)	October 1488 c. 18 —	17 October 1488
That the castell of Dunbar be distroyit. That the castle of Dunbar be destroyed. (Repealed by Statute Law Revision (Scotland) Act 1906 (6 Edw. 7. c. 38))
King's Revocation Act 1488 (repealed)	October 1488 c. 19; 1488 c. 5	17 October 1488
Revocacion of alienacionis of giftis and privilegis grantit sen the secund day of februar last by past be our soverane lordis faidir. Revocation of alienations, of gifts and privileges granted, since the second day of February last by our sovereign lord's father. (Repealed by Statute Law Revision (Scotland) Act 1906 (6 Edw. 7. c. 38))
Heirs of those Slain in Battle Act 1488 (repealed)	October 1488 c. 20; 1488 c. 6	17 October 1488
Anent the aieris of lordis baronis and uthir landit men that war with oure soverane lord that now is in the feild of Sterviling. About the heirs of lords, barons, and other landed men that were with our sovereign lord that now is in the field of Sterling. (Repealed by Statute Law Revision (Scotland) Act 1906 (6 Edw. 7. c. 38))

=== January ===
A parliament of James IV, held from 14 January 1489.

Short title, or popular name	Citation	Royal assent
Long title
Coin and Bullion Act 1488 (repealed)	January 1488 c. 1 (Note: This is the citation in the Record Edition.) — (Note: This act is not listed in the Duodecimal Edition.)	14 January 1489
Of the cunye and inbringing of bulyone. Of the coin and importation of bullion. (Repealed by Statute Law Revision (Scotland) Act 1906 (6 Edw. 7. c. 38))
Archdiocese of Glasgow Act 1489 Not public and general	January 1488 c. 2 —	14 January 1489
Erectioun of the sege of Glasgw in ane Archibischoprik. Raising the see of Glasgow to an archdiocese.
Salmon Barrels Act 1488 (repealed)	January 1488 c. 3 —	14 January 1489
Anent the barell of salmond and the pakking and mesure of the samyn. About the barrel of salmon, and the packing and measure of the same. (Repealed by Statute Law Revision (Scotland) Act 1906 (6 Edw. 7. c. 38))
Not public and general	January 1488 c. 4 —	14 January 1489
Deliverance anent Schir Henry Sinclare to be callit Lord Sinclar in tyme to cum. Decision about Sir Henry Sinclair, to be called Lord Sinclair in time to come.
Not public and general	January 1488 c. 5 —	14 January 1489
Of James Erle of Buchane. Of James, Earl of Buchan.

=== Sources ===
- Alexander, William (1841). "Acta Parliamentorum Regis Jacobi Quarti". An Abridgement of the Acts of the Parliaments of Scotland. Edinburgh: Adam and Charles Black. pp. 446–447 – via Google Books.
- Alexander, William (1841). "Acta Parliamentorum Regis Jacobi Quarti". An Abridgement of the Acts of the Parliaments of Scotland. Edinburgh: Adam and Charles Black. pp. 446–447 – via Google Books.
- Chronological Table of the Statutes. London: Her Majesty's Stationery Office. 1972. p. 1324 – via Google Books.
- "Index of Statutes: James IV (1488-1513)". Records of the Parliaments of Scotland to 1707. University of St Andrews.

== See also ==
- List of legislation in the United Kingdom
- Records of the Parliaments of Scotland
