= Wapenshaw =

A wapenshaw or wapinshaw (from the Old English for "weapon show") was originally a gathering and review of troops formerly held in every district in Scotland. The object was to satisfy the military chiefs that the arms of their retainers were in good condition and that the men were properly trained in their use.

== Use of 'wapenshaw' in lawn bowls ==
The term is still in use, to describe some competitions by bowling clubs in Scotland.

== Use of 'wapenshaw' in shooting ==
Wapenshaw is also occasionally used, in Scotland and elsewhere in the United Kingdom for rifle or other gun shows, particularly those involving historic weapons.

== The Woodcraft Folk ==
Wapenshaw is also widely used by The Woodcraft Folk to describe a daily ceremony when camping, which involves each camper removing all belongings from their tent and laying them out on a groundsheet in a fixed order. This serves two purposes: to air out the tent, and to ensure that no items have been lost.
