= Statute Law Revision (Scotland) Act 1906 =

Act of the Parliament of the United Kingdom

Statute Law Revision (Scotland) Act 1906 (Note: Section 2.)
- Act of Parliament
- Parliament of the United Kingdom
- Long title: An Act to further promote the Revision of the Statute Law by repealing Enactments which have ceased to be in force or have become unnecessary.
- Citation: 6 Edw. 7. c. 38
- Territorial extent: United Kingdom

Dates
- Royal assent: 4 August 1906
- Commencement: 4 August 1906 (Note: The Acts of Parliament (Commencement) Act 1793.)
Other legislation
Amended by	Statute Law Revision Act 1927

Status: Amended

Text of statute as originally enacted

The Statute Law Revision (Scotland) Act 1906 (6 Edw. 7. c. 38) is an act of the Parliament of the United Kingdom that revised the pre-Union acts of the Parliament of Scotland.

The whole act was partly in force in Great Britain at the end of 2010.

== Subsequent developments ==
The schedule to the act was repealed by section 1 of, and part I of the schedule to, the Statute Law Revision Act 1927 (17 & 18 Geo. 5. c. 42), which came into force on 22 December 1927.

== See also ==
- Statute Law Revision Act
