= List of acts of the Parliament of Scotland from 1707 =

This is a list of acts of the Parliament of Scotland for the year 1707.

It lists acts of Parliament of the old Parliament of Scotland, that was merged with the old Parliament of England to form the Parliament of Great Britain, by the Union with England Act 1707 (c. 7).

For other years, see list of acts of the Parliament of Scotland. For the period after 1707, see list of acts of the Parliament of Great Britain.

== 1707 ==
Continuing the 4th session of the parliament of Anne, held in Edinburgh from 3 October 1706 until 25 March 1707.

Short title, or popular name	Citation	Royal assent
Long title
Adjournment of Session Act 1707 (repealed)	1707 c. 5 (Note: This is the citation in the Record Edition.); 1707 c. 5 (Note: This is the citation in the Duodecimal Edition.)	2 January 1707
Act Adjourning the Session to the fourth day of February next to come. (Repealed by Statute Law Revision (Scotland) Act 1906 (6 Edw. 7. c. 38))
Protestant Religion and Presbyterian Church Act 1707 still in force or the Act of Security 1707	1707 c. 6; 1707 c. 6	16 January 1707
Act for Securing the Protestant Religion and Presbyterian Church Government.
Union with England Act 1707 still in force	1707 c. 7; 1707 c. 7	16 January 1707
Act Ratifying and Approving the Treaty of Union of the Two Kingdoms of Scotland and England.
Election Act 1707 (repealed)	1707 c. 8; 1707 c. 8	5 February 1707
Act Settling the manner of Electing the Sixteen Peers and Forty Five Commoners to Represent Scotland in the Parliament of Great Britain. (Repealed by Electoral Administration Act 2006 (c. 22))
Not public and general	1707 c. 9 — (Note: This act is not listed in the Duodecimal Edition.)	12 February 1707
Act of Dissolution of the Lands of and Zetland from the Crown in of the Earl of Morton.
Kirks and Teinds Act 1707 (repealed)	1707 c. 10 c. 9	21 February 1707
Act anent Plantation of Kirks and Valuation of Teinds. (Repealed by Statute Law Revision (Scotland) Act 1964 (c. 80))
Musters of Fencibles Act 1707 (repealed)	1707 c. 11; 1707 c. 10	21 February 1707
Act Discharging Musters and Rendezvouzes till the first day of January next and Prorogating the Suspension of the clause in the Act of Security thereanent till the said time. (Repealed by Statute Law Revision (Scotland) Act 1906 (6 Edw. 7. c. 38))
Not public and general	1707 c. 12 —	21 March 1707
Ratification in favours of James Duke Queensberry Her Majesty's high Commissioner of the Dukedom of Queensberry &c.
Not public and general	1707 c. 13 —	21 March 1707
Ratification in favours of John Duke of Argyll of a gift approving the rights of the office of Great Master Houshold &c. within this Kingdom.
Not public and general	1707 c. 14 —	21 March 1707
Ratification in favours of Alexander Earl of Kellie of a tack of the feu-duties & c of the lands of Kingsbarns.
Not public and general	1707 c. 15 —	21 March 1707
Ratification in favours of Thomas Viscount of Duplin of the Lands and Baronies of Cultmalundie and Keillor &c.
Not public and general	1707 c. 16 —	21 March 1707
Ratification in favours of Robert Lord Colvill of the Lands and Barony of Cleish.
Not public and general	1707 c. 17 —	21 March 1707
Ratification in favours of Dame Margaret Campbell Lady Cessnock of the Lands and Barony of Cessnock &c.
Not public and general	1707 c. 18 —	21 March 1707
Ratification in favours of Sir Gilbert Elliot of Minto of the Barony of Minto.
Not public and general	1707 c. 19 —	21 March 1707
Ratification in favours of Sir David Home of Crossrig of eight husband lands of Crossrig.
Not public and general	1707 c. 20 —	21 March 1707
Ratification in favours of Mr Roderick Mackenzie of Prestounhall of the Barony of Lovat.
Not public and general	1707 c. 21 —	21 March 1707
Ratification in favours of Sir Walter Riddell of that Ilk of the Lands and Barony of Riddell.
Not public and general	1707 c. 22 —	21 March 1707
Ratification in favours of Sir William Sharp of Stonyhill of the Lands of Stonyhill.
Not public and general	1707 c. 23 —	21 March 1707
Ratification in favours of Sir Alexander Erskine of Cambo and his son of the gift of the office of Lyon King of Arms.
Not public and general	1707 c. 24 —	21 March 1707
Ratification in favours of Sir William Dunbar of Hemprigs Knight and Baronet and his spouse of the Barony of Hemprigs.
Not public and general	1707 c. 25 —	21 March 1707
Ratification in favours of Archibald Douglass of Cavers and his son of the Lands & Barony of Cavers.
Not public and general	1707 c. 26 —	21 March 1707
Ratification in favours of William Bennet eldest lawful son of Sir William Bennet of Grubbet of the Barony of Grubbet.
Not public and general	1707 c. 27 —	21 March 1707
Ratification in favours of Robert Rutherford of Bowland of the Barony of Bowland.
Not public and general	1707 c. 28 —	21 March 1707
Ratification in favours of Sir William Scot of Harden of the half of the Town & Lands of Dalcove.
Not public and general	1707 c. 29 —	21 March 1707
Ratification in favours of Mr John Pringle Advocat of the Barony of Hayning.
Not public and general	1707 c. 30 —	21 March 1707
Ratification in favours of Captain Robert Johnstoun late Provost of Dumfreis and his son of the Barony of Keltoun &c.
Not public and general	1707 c. 31 —	21 March 1707
Ratification in favours of Mr David Plenderleith of Blyth Advocat & his spouse of the Barony of Kailzie.
Not public and general	1707 c. 32 —	21 March 1707
Ratification of a Signature in favours of Charles Earl of Hopetoun exonering them of the tenth of the ore of metals out of the mines at Hopetoun.
Not public and general	1707 c. 33 —	21 March 1707
Ratification in favours of David French of Frenchland of the Town & Lands of Frenchland
Not public and general	1707 c. 34 —	21 March 1707
Ratification in favours of the Principal, Professors and Masters of the Colledge of Glasgow of a gift of 300 yearly for payment of its debts &c.
Not public and general	1707 c. 35 —	21 March 1707
Ratification in favours of Daniel Steuart brother german to Sir William Steuart of Castlemilk of a gift of Receiver General & c of the imposition for Coinage.
Not public and general	1707 c. 36 —	21 March 1707
Ratification in favours of William Earl of Kilmarnock of the Lordship & Barony of Kilmarnock.
Not public and general	1707 c. 37 —	21 March 1707
Ratification in favours of James Marquiss of Montrose and his son of the title of Marquis of Montross Earl of Kincardine &c.
Bass Rock Act 1707 Not public and general	1707 c. 38 —	21 March 1707
Ratification in favours of Sir Hugh Dalrymple of Northberwick Lord President of the College of Justice of a Gift of the Island and rock called Bass.
Not public and general	1707 c. 39 —	21 March 1707
Ratification in favours of Mr Alexander Meinzies of Culterallors and Mary Menzies his spouse of the half of the lands Barony and mill of Culter &c.
Not public and general	1707 c. 40 —	21 March 1707
Ratification in favours of Mr John Mackenzie of Delvin of the Baronies of Delvin and Lentron &c.
Not public and general	1707 c. 41 —	21 March 1707
Ratification in favours of James Earle of Bute of the Barony and Regality of Bute &c.
Not public and general	1707 c. 42 —	21 March 1707
Ratification in favours of William Drummond lawful son to George Drummond of Blair-Drummond of the office of Warden of the Mint and Coining house.
Not public and general	1707 c. 43 —	21 March 1707
Ratification in favours of Dame Janet Halket Lady Pitfirren of a gift of the privilege of transporting the Coals within the bounds of the estate of Pitfirren free from dutie.
Not public and general	1707 c. 44 —	21 March 1707
Ratification in favours of John Doull Writer in Edinburgh of the lands of Underedge and Southernflat &c.
Not public and general	1707 c. 45 —	21 March 1707
Ratification in favours of Captain James Cranstoun of Glen and Mrs Jean Murray his spouse of the Lands of Glen &c.
Not public and general	1707 c. 46 —	21 March 1707
Ratification in favours of James Earl of Morton of the Earldom of Orkney and Lordship of Zetland.
Not public and general	1707 c. 47 —	21 March 1707
Ratification in favours of John Earl of Stair, of the Earldom of Stair, Lordship and Barony of Dalrymple.
Not public and general	1707 c. 48 —	21 March 1707
Ratification in favours of Edward Hyde eldest lawful son of Edward Lord Cornburry of a tack of the few duties of the Island of Ila &c.
Not public and general	1707 c. 49 —	21 March 1707
Ratification in favours of Archibald Earl of Roseberry of the Lands and Barony of Pitravie &c.
Not public and general	1707 c. 50 —	21 March 1707
Ratification in favours of Archibald Earl of Roseberry of the Island of Garvie in the river of Forth.
Not public and general	1707 c. 51 —	21 March 1707
Ratification in favours of David Earl of Glasgow and Jean Countess of Glasgow of the Earldom of Glasgow and Lordship and Barony of Kelburn.
Not public and general	1707 c. 52 —	21 March 1707
Ratification in favours of Hugh Earl of Lowdoun of the Lands, Earldom and Estate of Loudoun.
Not public and general	1707 c. 53 —	25 March 1707
Ratification in favours of Archibald Duke of Douglas, of the Dukedom, Marquisate, Earldom, Lordship & Barony of Douglas & Angus and of the first vote in Parliament &c.
Not public and general	1707 c. 54 —	25 March 1707
Ratification in favours of Mr John Murray Advocat Commissar of Peebles of the Barony of Yare.
Not public and general	1707 c. 55 —	25 March 1707
Ratification in favours of Sir Thomas Moncrief of that Ilk and Sir James Mackenzie Advocat, of the office of Clerk to the Thesaury &c.
Not public and general	1707 c. 56 —	25 March 1707
Ratification of a gift in favours of John Veitch elder of Daick and John Veitch bis son of the office of presenting Signa tures in Exchequer &c.
Not public and general	1707 c. 57 —	25 March 1707
Ratification in favours of James Viscount of Primrose, of the Regality of Primrose.
Not public and general	1707 c. 58 —	25 March 1707
Ratification of the gift in favours of George Earl of Cromarty, of the Chaplanries of Alness Newmore and Tarlogie &c. at the burgh of Dingwall.
Not public and general	1707 c. 59 —	25 March 1707
Ratification in favours of John Viscount of Garnock, of the barony of Kilbirny.
Not public and general	1707 c. 60 —	25 March 1707
Ratification of a gift in favours of Colin Earl of Balcarras of 500 Sterling yearly out of the Lands and Lordships of Fife Strathairne &c.
Not public and general	1707 c. 61 —	25 March 1707
Act in favours of Sir Alexr Campbell of Cessnock, for yearly fairs and mercats at the touns of Galstoun and Riccartoun.
Not public and general	1707 c. 62 —	25 March 1707
Act in favours of the Burgh of Dunbar for a yearlie fair.
Not public and general	1707 c. 63 —	25 March 1707
Act in favours of the Burgh of Cambeltoun for three yearlie fairs.
Not public and general	1707 c. 64 —	25 March 1707
Act in favours of John Duke of Argyll for five yearly fairs at the toun of Dunoon.
Not public and general	1707 c. 65 —	25 March 1707
Act in favours of Mr John Campbell of Oatter for two yearly fairs at the ferry of Oatter.
Not public and general	1707 c. 66 —	25 March 1707
Act in favours of John Lord Balmerinoch for changing a yearly fair at the toun of Cupar in the shire of Forfar.
Not public and general	1707 c. 67 —	25 March 1707
Act in favours of John Bruce of Kinross for four yearly fairs at the toun of Kinross.
Not public and general	1707 c. 68 —	25 March 1707
Act in favours of Sir Alexr Cuningham of Corsehill for four yearly fairs and a weekly mercat on the 40 shilling land of Cocklebee.
Not public and general	1707 c. 69 —	25 March 1707
Act in favours of Sir Samuel Forbes of Foveran for three yearly fairs upon the lands and barony of Foveran.
Not public and general	1707 c. 70 —	25 March 1707
Act in favours of James Sinclair of Lyth for various fairs in the shire of Caithness.
Not public and general	1707 c. 71 —	25 March 1707
Act in favours of Sir David Carnegy of Pittarro for two yearly fairs upon Cammockmuir.
Not public and general	1707 c. 72 —	25 March 1707
Act in favours of the Lady Cardross for two yearly fairs and a weekly mercat at the toun of Brocksburn.
Not public and general	1707 c. 73 —	25 March 1707
Act in favours of David Earl of Glasgow for three yearly fairs and a weekly mercat upon the lands of Doghilloch.
Not public and general	1707 c. 74 —	25 March 1707
Act in favours of Sir Francis Kinloch of Gilmertoun for a yearly fair and weekly mercat at the toun of Athelstanfoord.
Not public and general	1707 c. 75 —	25 March 1707
Act in favours of Sir Alexander Murray of Melgum for a weekly mercat at Arlemno.
Not public and general	1707 c. 76 —	25 March 1707
Act in favours of William Bennet younger of Grubbet for two yearly fairs and a weekly mercat at the kirk of Yetholme.
Not public and general	1707 c. 77 —	25 March 1707
Act in favours of Sir James Dalrymple of Killoch for two yearly fairs at Herriothouse.
Not public and general	1707 c. 78 —	25 March 1707
Act in favours of Sir John Areskine of Alva for two yearly fairs at the toun of Alva
Trades' Maiden Hospital Act 1707 Not public and general	1707 c. 79 —	25 March 1707
Act in favours of the Incorporations of Edinburgh for a Maiden Hospitall.
Dundee Beer Duties Act 1707 Not public and general	1707 c. 80 —	25 March 1707
Act in favours of the Town of Dundee for an Imposition upon Ale and Beer.
Aberdeen Beer Duties Act 1707 Not public and general	1707 c. 81 —	25 March 1707
Act in favours of the Town of Aberdeen for an Imposition upon Liquors.
Borroustounness Beer Duties Act 1707 Not public and general	1707 c. 82 —	25 March 1707
Act in favours of the Duke of Hamilton and Town of Borroustounness for an Imposition on Ale and Beer.
Kirkcaldy Beer Duties Act 1707 Not public and general	1707 c. 83 —	25 March 1707
Act in favours of the Burgh of Kirkcaldy for an Imposition on Ale and Beer.
Not public and general	1707 c. 84; 1707 c. 11	25 March 1707
Act Renouncing the Reversion of Kirklands.
Kinghorn Beer Duties Act 1707 Not public and general	1707 c. 85 —	25 March 1707
Act in favours of the Burgh of Kinghorn for an Imposition on Ale and Beer.
Not public and general	1707 c. 86; 1707 c. 12	25 March 1707
Act for clearing the Passage throw the Mary Wynd in the Burgh of Stirling.
Not public and general	1707 c. 87 —	25 March 1707
Act in favours of James Earl of Linlithgow and Callander for a toll on the bridge of Larbor for 22 years.
Not public and general	1707 c. 88 —	25 March 1707
Act in favours of the Lady Littlegill and William Baillie her son for an Imposition at the bridges of Ramwell Craig and Dunneden.
Huguetan's Naturalization Act 1707	1707 c. 90 —	25 March 1707
Act of Naturalization in favours of John Henry Huguetan.
Game Act 1707 (repealed)	1707 c. 91; 1707 c. 13	25 March 1707
Act for preserving the Game. (Repealed by Statute Law Revision (Scotland) Act 1964 (c. 80))
Not public and general	1707 c. 92 —	25 March 1707
Act in favours of the Earl of Buchan.
Not public and general	1707 c. 93 —	25 March 1707
Act of Dissolution of the Mines and Minerals belonging to his Grace James Duke of Queensberry.
Wool Act 1707 (repealed)	1707 c. 94; 1707 c. 14	25 March 1707
Act for Burying in Woollen. (Repealed by Statute Law Revision (Scotland) Act 1906 (6 Edw. 7. c. 38))
Merchants' Maiden Hospital Act 1707 Not public and general	1707 c. 95 —	25 March 1707
Act in favours of the Maiden Hospitall founded by the Company of Merchants of Edinburgh and Mary Erskine.
Company of Scotland Act 1707 (repealed)	1707 c. 96; 1707 c. 15	25 March 1707
Act concerning the Payment of the Sums out of the Equivalent to the African Company. (Repealed by Statute Law Revision (Scotland) Act 1906 (6 Edw. 7. c. 38))
Public Debts Act 1707 (repealed)	1707 c. 97; 1707 c. 16	25 March 1707
Act concerning the Publick Debts. (Repealed by Statute Law Revision (Scotland) Act 1906 (6 Edw. 7. c. 38)
Payment to African Company Act 1707 Not public and general	1707 c. 98; 1707 c. 17	25 March 1707
Act concerning the Payment of the Sums out of the Equivalent to the African Company.
Adjournment Act 1707 (repealed)	Vol. XI, p. 491; 1707 c. 18	25 March 1707
Act of Adjournment. (Repealed by Statute Law Revision (Scotland) Act 1906 (6 Edw. 7. c. 38))

=== Sources ===
- Alexander, William (1841). "Acta Parliamentorum Annæ". An Abridgement of the Acts of the Parliaments of Scotland. Edinburgh: Adam and Charles Black. pp. 523–524 – via Google Books.
- Alexander, William (1841). "Acta Parliamentorum Annæ". An Abridgement of the Acts of the Parliaments of Scotland. Edinburgh: Adam and Charles Black. pp. 523–524 – via Google Books.
- Chronological Table of the Statutes. London: Her Majesty's Stationery Office. 1972. p. 1368 – via Google Books.
- "Acts of the Old Scottish Parliament: 1707". legislation.gov.uk. The National Archives.
- "Index of Statutes: Anne (1702-1707)". Records of the Parliaments of Scotland to 1707. University of St Andrews.

== See also ==
- List of legislation in the United Kingdom
- Records of the Parliaments of Scotland
