= Kirkcaldy Beer Duties Act 1741 =

Act of the Parliament of Great Britain

- Act of Parliament
- Parliament of Great Britain
- Long title: An Act for laying a Duty of Two Pennies Scots, or One Sixth Part of a Penny Sterling, upon every Scots Pint of Ale and Beer, which shall be brewed for Sale, brought into, tapped, or sold, within the Town of Kircaldy, and Liberties thereof.
- Citation: 15 Geo. 2. c. 8
- Territorial extent: Great Britain

Dates
- Royal assent: 15 April 1742
- Commencement: 1 December 1741 (Note: Start of session.)
- Repealed: 30 July 1948
Other legislation
Amended by	Kirkcaldy Beer Duties Act 1757; Kirkcaldy Beer Duties Act 1791
Repealed by	Statute Law Revision Act 1948
Relates to	Kirkcaldy Beer Duties Act 1707

Status: Repealed

Text of statute as originally enacted

The Kirkcaldy Beer Duties Act 1741 (15 Geo. 2. c. 8) was an act of the Parliament of Great Britain passed in 1742 that placed a duty on all beer brewed or sold within the town of Kirkcaldy, which was set at two pennies Scots, or one-sixth of a penny sterling (equivalent to £0.27 in 2025), on each Scots pint (about three imperial pints or 1.7 litres) of beer.

== Subsequent developments ==
The whole act was repealed by section 1 of, and the first schedule to, the Statute Law Revision Act 1948 (11 & 12 Geo. 6. c. 62), which came into force on 30 July 1948.
