= Two Pennies Scots =

A duty (tax) of Two Pennies Scots per Scots pint of beer was placed on all beer brewed or sold within various towns in Scotland between the 1700s and the early 1800s. It was used to fund various local needs.

Two pennies Scots was equivalent to one-sixth of a penny Sterling. Adjusting for inflation, that is equivalent to £0.27 in 2025.

A Scots pint was equivalent to about three imperial pints or 1.7 litres of beer.

The last remaining Two Pennies Scots Acts were repealed by the Statute Law (Repeals) Act 2013.

== Towns ==
=== Alloa ===
In Alloa, an act of Parliament was passed in 1754.

Alloa Beer Duties Act 1754
- Act of Parliament
- Parliament of Great Britain
- Long title: An Act for laying a Duty of Two Pennies Scots, or One Sixth Part of a Penny Sterling, upon every Scots Pint of Ale and Beer, brewed for Sale, vended, or sold, within the Town and Barony of Alloa, in the County of Clackmannan, and also a Duty of Anchorage for Ships and Vessels anchoring in the Harbour of the said Town, for repairing the Pier of the said Harbour.
- Citation: 27 Geo. 2. c. 35
- Territorial extent: Great Britain

Dates
- Royal assent: 6 April 1754
- Commencement: 15 November 1753 (Note: Start of session.)
- Repealed: 30 July 1948
Other legislation
Repealed by	Statute Law Revision Act 1948

Status: Repealed

Text of statute as originally enacted

- Alloa Beer Duties Act 1754

=== Arbroath ===
In Arbroath, acts of Parliament were passed in 1738, 1763, 1787, 1808 and 1828.

Aberbrothock Beer Duties Act 1737
- Act of Parliament
- Parliament of Great Britain
- Long title: An Act for laying a Duty of Two Pennies Scots, or One Sixth Part of a Penny Sterling, upon every Scots Pint of Ale and Beer which shall be brewed for Sale, brought into, vended, tapped, or sold, within the Town of Aberbrothock, and Liberties thereof.
- Citation: 11 Geo. 2. c. 4
- Territorial extent: Great Britain

Dates
- Royal assent: 21 March 1738
- Commencement: 1 May 1738 (Note: Section 1.)
- Repealed: 30 July 1948
Other legislation
Amended by	Aberbrothock Beer Duties Act 1763; Aberbrothock Beer Duties Act 1787; Aberbrothock Two Pennies Scots Act 1808
Repealed by	Statute Law Revision Act 1948

Status: Repealed

Text of statute as originally enacted

- Aberbrothock Beer Duties Act 1737 (11 Geo. 2. c. 4)

Aberbrothock Beer Duties Act 1763
- Act of Parliament
- Parliament of Great Britain
- Long title: An Act for continuing an Act passed in the Eleventh Year of His late Majesty King George the Second, intituled, "An Act for laying a Duty of Two Pennies Scots, or One Sixth Part of a Penny Sterling, upon every Scots Pint of Ale and Beer which shall be brewed for Sale, brought into, vended, tapped, or sold, within the Town of Aberbrothock, and Liberties thereof."
- Citation: 3 Geo. 3. c. 28
- Territorial extent: Great Britain

Dates
- Royal assent: 24 March 1763
- Commencement: 25 November 1762
- Repealed: 30 July 1948
Other legislation
Amends	Aberbrothock Beer Duties Act 1737
Amended by	Aberbrothock Beer Duties Act 1787; Aberbrothock Two Pennies Scots Act 1808; Aberbrothock Two Pennies Scots Act 1828
Repealed by	Statute Law Revision Act 1948

Status: Repealed

Text of statute as originally enacted

- Aberbrothock Beer Duties Act 1763 (3 Geo. 3. c. 28)

Aberbrothock Beer Duties Act 1787
- Act of Parliament
- Parliament of Great Britain
- Long title: An Act for continuing the Term of Two Acts made in the Eleventh Year of the Reign of His late Majesty George the Second, and the Third Year of the Reign of His present Majesty, for laying a Duty of Two Pennies Scots, or One-sixth Part of a Penny Sterling, upon every Scots Pint of Ale, and Beer, which shall be brewed for Sale, brought into, vended, tapped, or sold within the Town of Aberbrothock, and Liberties thereof.
- Citation: 27 Geo. 3. c. 46
- Territorial extent: Great Britain

Dates
- Royal assent: 28 May 1787
- Commencement: 23 January 1787
- Repealed: 30 July 1948
Other legislation
Amends	Aberbrothock Beer Duties Act 1737; Aberbrothock Beer Duties Act 1763
Amended by	Aberbrothock Two Pennies Scots Act 1808; Aberbrothock Two Pennies Scots Act 1828
Repealed by	Statute Law Revision Act 1948

Status: Repealed

Text of statute as originally enacted

- Aberbrothock Beer Duties Act 1787 (27 Geo. 3. c. 46)

Aberbrothock Two Pennies Scots Act 1808
- Act of Parliament
- Parliament of the United Kingdom
- Long title: An Act to continue several Acts for granting a Duty of Two Pennies Scots upon Ale and Beer brewed in the Town of Aberbrothock, in the County of Forfar.
- Citation: 48 Geo. 3. c. xiv
- Territorial extent: United Kingdom

Dates
- Royal assent: 28 March 1808
- Commencement: 28 March 1808 (Note: The Acts of Parliament (Commencement) Act 1793.)
- Repealed: 31 January 2013
Other legislation
Amends	Aberbrothock Beer Duties Act 1737; Aberbrothock Beer Duties Act 1763; Aberbrothock Beer Duties Act 1787
Amended by	Aberbrothock Two Pennies Scots Act 1828
Repealed by	Statute Law (Repeals) Act 2013

Status: Repealed

Text of statute as originally enacted

- Aberbrothock Two Pennies Scots Act 1808 (48 Geo. 3. c. xiv)

Aberbrothock Two Pennies Scots Act 1828
- Act of Parliament
- Parliament of the United Kingdom
- Long title: An Act to continue several Acts for granting a Duty of Two Pennies Scots upon Ale and Beer brewed in the Town of Aberbrothock, in the County of Forfar.
- Citation: 9 Geo. 4. c. xiii
- Territorial extent: United Kingdom

Dates
- Royal assent: 3 April 1828
- Commencement: 3 April 1828
- Repealed: 31 January 2013
Other legislation
Amends	Aberbrothock Beer Duties Act 1737; Aberbrothock Beer Duties Act 1763; Aberbrothock Beer Duties Act 1787; Aberbrothock Two Pennies Scots Act 1808
Repealed by	Statute Law (Repeals) Act 2013

Status: Repealed

Text of statute as originally enacted

- Aberbrothock Two Pennies Scots Act 1828 (9 Geo. 4. c. xiii)

=== Aberdeen ===
In Aberdeen, acts of Parliament were passed in 1695, 1707 and 1730.

Aberdeen Beer Duties Act 1695
- Act of Parliament
- Parliament of Scotland
- Long title: Act in favours of the Burgh of Aberdeen for an Imposition on Ale &c. for repairing their harbour.
- Citation: 1695 c. 60 (S)
- Territorial extent: Scotland

Dates
- Royal assent: 16 July 1695
Other legislation
Amended by	Aberdeen Beer Duties Act 1707; Aberdeen Beer Duties Act 1730

- Aberdeen Beer Duties Act 1695 (c. 60 (S))

Aberdeen Beer Duties Act 1707
- Act of Parliament
- Parliament of Scotland
- Long title: Act in favours of the Town of Aberdeen for an Imposition upon Liquors.
- Citation: 1707 c. 81 (S)
- Territorial extent: Scotland

Dates
- Royal assent: 25 March 1707
Other legislation
Amends	Aberdeen Beer Duties Act 1707
Amended by	Aberdeen Beer Duties Act 1730

- Aberdeen Beer Duties Act 1707 (c. 81 (S))

Aberdeen Beer Duties Act 1730
- Act of Parliament
- Parliament of Great Britain
- Long title: An Act for the further continuing the Duties granted by an Act passed in the Parliament of Scotland, in the Year One Thousand Six Hundred and Ninety-five, and continued by an Act passed in the Year One Thousand Seven Hundred and Seven, for paying off the Debts of the Town of Aberdeen, and for other public Uses of the said Town.
- Citation: 4 Geo. 2. c. 13
- Territorial extent: Great Britain

Dates
- Royal assent: 7 May 1731
- Commencement: 21 January 1731
- Repealed: 30 July 1948
Other legislation
Amends	Aberdeen Beer Duties Act 1695; Aberdeen Beer Duties Act 1707
Repealed by	Statute Law Revision Act 1948
Relates to	Dundee Beer Duties Act 1730

Status: Repealed

Text of statute as originally enacted

- Aberdeen Beer Duties Act 1730 (4 Geo. 2. c. 13)

=== Anstruther ===
In Anstruther.

Anstruther Easter Beer Duties Act 1748
- Act of Parliament
- Parliament of Great Britain
- Long title: An Act for laying a Duty of Two Pennies Scots upon every Scots Pint of Beer and Ale, which shall be sold or vended, brewed, brought in, or tapped for Sale, within the Town of Anstrather Easter and Liberties thereof.
- Citation: 22 Geo. 2. c. 10
- Territorial extent: Great Britain

Dates
- Royal assent: 22 March 1749
- Commencement: 29 November 1748
- Expired: 29 November 1773
- Repealed: 30 July 1948
Other legislation
Amended by	Anstruther Easter Beer Duties Act 1775
Repealed by	Statute Law Revision Act 1948
Relates to	Kinghorn Beer Duties Act 1748

Status: Repealed

Text of statute as originally enacted

- Anstruther Easter Beer Duties Act 1748 (22 Geo. 2. c. 10)

Anstruther Easter Beer Duties Act 1775
- Act of Parliament
- Parliament of Great Britain
- Long title: An Act to continue the Term of an Act, made in the Twenty-second Year of the Reign of His late Majesty King George the Second, for laying a Duty of Two Pennies Scots upon every Scots Pint of Beer and Ale which shall be sold or vended, brewed, brought in, or tapped, for Sale, within the Town of Anstruther Easter, and Liberties thereof.
- Citation: 15 Geo. 3. c. 48
- Territorial extent: Great Britain

Dates
- Royal assent: 22 May 1775
- Commencement: 29 November 1774
- Repealed: 30 July 1948
Other legislation
Amends	Anstruther Easter Beer Duties Act 1748
Repealed by	Statute Law Revision Act 1948

Status: Repealed

Text of statute as originally enacted

- Anstruther Easter Beer Duties Act 1775 (15 Geo. 3. c. 48)

=== Bo'ness ===
In Bo'ness, acts of Parliament were passed in 1707, 1744, 1767, 1794 and 1816.

Borroustounness Beer Duties Act 1707
- Act of Parliament
- Parliament of Scotland
- Long title: Act in favours of the Duke of Hamilton and Town of Borroustounness for an Imposition on Ale and Beer.
- Citation: 1707 c. 82 (S)
- Territorial extent: Scotland

Dates
- Royal assent: 25 March 1707

- Borroustounness Beer Duties Act 1707 (c. 82 (S))

Borrowstouness Beer Duties Act 1743
- Act of Parliament
- Parliament of Great Britain
- Long title: An Act for laying a Duty of Two Pennies Scots, or a Sixth Part of a Penny Sterling, upon every Scots Pint of Ale and Beer which shall be brewed for Sale, brought into, tapped, or sold, within the Town of Burrowstouness and Liberties thereof, in the County of Linlithgow, for repairing the Harbour of the said Town.
- Citation: 17 Geo. 2. c. 21
- Territorial extent: Great Britain

Dates
- Royal assent: 22 March 1744
- Commencement: 1 December 1743
- Repealed: 4 July 1843
Other legislation
Amended by	Borrowstouness Beer Duties Act 1766; Borrowstoness Beer Duties Act 1794; Borrowstounness Two Pennies Scots Act 1816
Repealed by	Borrowstouness Town and Harbour Act 1843
Relates to	Borrowstounness Town and Harbour Act 1875

Status: Repealed

Text of statute as originally enacted

- Borrowstouness Beer Duties Act 1743 (17 Geo. 2. c. 21)

Borrowstouness Beer Duties Act 1766
- Act of Parliament
- Parliament of Great Britain
- Long title: An Act for continuing the Duty of Two Pennies Scots, or a Sixth Part of a Penny Sterling, upon every Scots Pint of Ale and Beer, which shall be brewed for Sale, brought into, tapped, or sold, within the Town of Burrowstounness and Liberties thereof, in the County of Linlithgow; and for extending the same over the Parish of Burrowstounness; for repairing the Harbour of the said Town; and for other Purposes therein mentioned.
- Citation: 7 Geo. 3. c. 90
- Territorial extent: Great Britain

Dates
- Royal assent: 15 April 1767
- Commencement: 11 November 1766
- Repealed: 4 July 1843
Other legislation
Amends	Borrowstouness Beer Duties Act 1743
Amended by	Borrowstoness Beer Duties Act 1794; Borrowstounness Two Pennies Scots Act 1816
Repealed by	Borrowstouness Town and Harbour Act 1843
Relates to	Borrowstounness Town and Harbour Act 1875

Status: Repealed

Text of statute as originally enacted

- Borrowstouness Beer Duties Act 1766 (7 Geo. 3. c. 90)

Borrowstoness Beer Duties Act 1794
- Act of Parliament
- Parliament of Great Britain
- Long title: An Act to continue the Term and enlarge the Powers of two Acts made in the seventeenth Year of the Reign of His late Majesty King George the Second, and the seventh Year of the Reign of His present Majesty, for continuing the Duty of two Pennies Scots, or a sixth Part of a Penny Sterling upon every Scots Pint of Ale and Beer which shall be brewed for Sale, brought into, tapped or sold within the Town of Burrowstounness and Liberties thereof, in the County of Linlithgow; and for extending the same over the Parish of Borrowstounness; for repairing the Harbour of the said Town; and for other Purposes therein mentioned.
- Citation: 34 Geo. 3. c. 91
- Territorial extent: Great Britain

Dates
- Royal assent: 9 May 1794
- Commencement: 9 May 1794
- Repealed: 4 July 1843
Other legislation
Amends	Borrowstouness Beer Duties Act 1743; Borrowstouness Beer Duties Act 1766
Amended by	Borrowstounness Two Pennies Scots Act 1816
Repealed by	Borrowstouness Town and Harbour Act 1843
Relates to	Borrowstounness Town and Harbour Act 1875

Status: Repealed

Text of statute as originally enacted

- Borrowstoness Beer Duties Act 1794 (34 Geo. 3. c. 91)

Borrowstounness Two Pennies Scots Act 1816
- Act of Parliament
- Parliament of the United Kingdom
- Long title: An Act to continue the Term and enlarge the Powers of several Acts for imposing and continuing a Duty of Two Pennies Scots, or the Sixth Part of a Penny Sterling, upon every Scots Pint of Ale and Beer which shall be brewed for Sale, brought into, tapped or sold within the Town of Borrowestowness and Liberties thereof, in the County of Linlithgow, and for extending the same over the Parish of Borrowestowness; for repairing the Harbour of the said Town; and for other Purposes therein mentioned.
- Citation: 56 Geo. 3. c. xxxvi
- Territorial extent: United Kingdom

Dates
- Royal assent: 31 May 1816
- Commencement: 31 May 1816
- Repealed: 4 July 1843
Other legislation
Amends	Borrowstouness Beer Duties Act 1743; Borrowstouness Beer Duties Act 1766; Borrowstoness Beer Duties Act 1794
Repealed by	Borrowstouness Town and Harbour Act 1843
Relates to	Borrowstounness Town and Harbour Act 1875

Status: Repealed

Text of statute as originally enacted

- Borrowstounness Two Pennies Scots Act 1816 (56 Geo. 3. c. xxxvi)

=== Burntisland ===
In Burntisland, acts of Parliament were passed in 1720, 1747, 1777 and 1807.

Bruntisland Beer Duties Act 1719
- Act of Parliament
- Parliament of Great Britain
- Long title: An Act for laying a Duty of Two Pennies Scotts, or one Sixth Part of a Penny Sterling, upon every Scotts Pint of Beer or Ale vended or sold within the Town of Bruntisland and Liberties thereof, for increasing the public Revenue of the said Town; and for other Purposes therein mentioned.
- Citation: 6 Geo. 1. c. 8
- Territorial extent: Great Britain

Dates
- Royal assent: 7 April 1720
- Commencement: 24 June 1720
- Repealed: 30 July 1948
Other legislation
Amended by	Bruntisland Beer Duties Act 1746; Burntisland Beer Duties Act 1776; Burntisland Two Pennies Scots Act 1807
Repealed by	Statute Law Revision Act 1948
Relates to	Montrose Beer Duties Act 1719; Pittenweem Beer Duties Act 1719

Status: Repealed

Text of statute as originally enacted

- Bruntisland Beer Duties Act 1719 (6 Geo. 1. c. 8)

Bruntisland Beer Duties Act 1746
- Act of Parliament
- Parliament of Great Britain
- Long title: An Act for reviving and continuing an Act passed in the Sixth Year of the Reign of His late Majesty King George the First, intituled, "An Act for laying a Duty of Two Penny Scots, or One Sixth Part of a Penny Sterling, upon every Scots Pint of Beer or Ale vended or sold within the Town of Bruntisland, and Liberties thereof, for increasing the public Revenue of the said Town, and for other Purposes therein mentioned."
- Citation: 20 Geo. 2. c. 26
- Territorial extent: Great Britain

Dates
- Royal assent: 17 June 1747
- Commencement: 18 November 1746
- Repealed: 30 July 1948
Other legislation
Amends	Bruntisland Beer Duties Act 1719
Amended by	Burntisland Beer Duties Act 1776; Burntisland Two Pennies Scots Act 1807
Repealed by	Statute Law Revision Act 1948

Status: Repealed

Text of statute as originally enacted

- Bruntisland Beer Duties Act 1746 (20 Geo. 2. c. 26)

Burntisland Beer Duties Act 1776
- Act of Parliament
- Parliament of Great Britain
- Long title: An Act for continuing Two Acts, made in the Sixth Year of the Reign of King George the First,[d] and in the Twentieth Year of the Reign of His late Majesty,[e] for laying a Duty of Two Pennies Scots, or One Sixth Part of a Penny Sterling upon every Scots Pint of Beer or Ale, vended or sold within the Town of Burntisland and Liberties thereof, for encreasing the publick Revenue of the said Town; and for other Purposes therein mentioned.
- Citation: 17 Geo. 3. c. 20
- Territorial extent: Great Britain

Dates
- Royal assent: 27 March 1777
- Commencement: 31 October 1776
- Repealed: 30 July 1948
Other legislation
Amends	Bruntisland Beer Duties Act 1719; Bruntisland Beer Duties Act 1746
Amended by	Burntisland Two Pennies Scots Act 1807
Repealed by	Statute Law Revision Act 1948

Status: Repealed

Text of statute as originally enacted

- Burntisland Beer Duties Act 1776 (17 Geo. 3. c. 20)

Burntisland Two Pennies Scots Act 1807
- Act of Parliament
- Parliament of the United Kingdom
- Long title: An Act for continuing Three Acts, of the Sixth Year of King George the First, in the Twentieth Year of King George the Second, and in the Seventeenth Year of His present Majesty, for laying a Duty of Two Pennies Scots, or One sixth Fart of a Penny Sterling, upon every Scots Pint of Beer or Ale vended or sold within the Town of Burntisland, and Liberties thereof, in the County of Fife, and for increasing the Publick Revenue of the said Town.
- Citation: 47 Geo. 3 Sess. 2. c. xli
- Territorial extent: United Kingdom

Dates
- Royal assent: 1 August 1807
- Commencement: 1 August 1807
- Repealed: 31 January 2013
Other legislation
Amends	Bruntisland Beer Duties Act 1719; Bruntisland Beer Duties Act 1746; Burntisland Beer Duties Act 1776
Repealed by	Statute Law (Repeals) Act 2013

Status: Repealed

- Burntisland Two Pennies Scots Act 1807 (47 Geo. 3 Sess. 2. c. xli)

=== Dalkeith ===
In Dalkeith, acts of Parliament were passed in 1760, 1782 and 1825.

Dalkeith Beer Duties Act 1759
- Act of Parliament
- Parliament of Great Britain
- Long title: An Act for laying a Duty of Two Pennies Scots, or One Sixth Part of a Penny Sterling, on every Scots Pint of Ale, Porter, or Beer, brewed for Sale, or vended, within the Town and Parish of Dalkeith.
- Citation: 33 Geo. 2. c. 53
- Territorial extent: Great Britain

Dates
- Royal assent: 22 May 1760
- Commencement: 13 November 1759
- Repealed: 30 July 1948
Other legislation
Amended by	Dalkeith Beer Duties Act 1782; Dalkeith Two Pennies Scots Act 1825
Repealed by	Statute Law Revision Act 1948

Status: Repealed

Text of statute as originally enacted

- Dalkeith Beer Duties Act 1759 (33 Geo. 2. c. 53)

Dalkeith Beer Duties Act 1782
- Act of Parliament
- Parliament of Great Britain
- Long title: An Act for continuing the Term and Powers of an Act made in the Thirty-third Year of the Reign of His late Majesty King George the Second, intituled, "An Act for laying a Duty of Two Pennies Scots, or One-sixth Part of a Penny Sterling, on every Scots Pint of Ale, Porter or Beer brewed for Sale, or vended within the Town and Parish of Dalkeith."
- Citation: 22 Geo. 3. c. 18
- Territorial extent: Great Britain

Dates
- Royal assent: 25 March 1782
- Commencement: 27 November 1781
- Repealed: 30 July 1948
Other legislation
Amends	Dalkeith Beer Duties Act 1782
Amended by	Dalkeith Two Pennies Scots Act 1825
Repealed by	Statute Law Revision Act 1948

Status: Repealed

Text of statute as originally enacted

- Dalkeith Beer Duties Act 1782 (22 Geo. 3. c. 18)

Dalkeith Two Pennies Scots Act 1825
- Act of Parliament
- Parliament of the United Kingdom
- Long title: An Act to continue and render more effectual certain Acts for laying a Duty of Two Pennies Scots, or One sixth Part of a Penny Sterling, on every Scots Pint of Ale or Beer brewed for Sale or vended within the Town and Parish of Dalkeith, for the Purposes therein mentioned.
- Citation: 6 Geo. 4. c. xxxvi
- Territorial extent: United Kingdom

Dates
- Royal assent: 2 May 1825
- Commencement: 2 May 1825
- Repealed: 31 January 2013
Other legislation
Amends	Dalkeith Beer Duties Act 1759; Dalkeith Beer Duties Act 1782
Repealed by	Statute Law (Repeals) Act 2013

Status: Repealed

- Dalkeith Two Pennies Scots Act 1825 (6 Geo. 4. c. xxxvi)

=== Dumfries ===
In Dumfries, acts of Parliament were passed in 1717, 1737, 1762, 1787 and 1811.

Dumfries Beer Duties Act 1716
- Act of Parliament
- Parliament of Great Britain
- Long title: An act for laying a duty of two pennies Scots, or one sixth part of a penny sterling, upon every pint of ale or beer that shall be vended or sold within the town of Dumfries, and privileges thereof, for paying the debts of the said town, and for building a church, and making a harbour there.
- Citation: 3 Geo. 1. c. 6
- Territorial extent: Great Britain

Dates
- Royal assent: 22 June 1717
- Commencement: 1 July 1717
- Repealed: 30 July 1948
Other legislation
Amended by	Dumfries Beer Duties Act 1736; Dumfries Beer Duties Act 1762; Dumfries Beer Duties Act 1787; Dumfries Two Pennies Scots Act 1811
Repealed by	Statute Law Revision Act 1948
Relates to	Edinburgh Beer Duties Act 1716

Status: Repealed

Text of statute as originally enacted

- Dumfries Beer Duties Act 1716 (3 Geo. 1. c. 6)

Dumfries Beer Duties Act 1736
- Act of Parliament
- Parliament of Great Britain
- Long title: An Act for continuing an Act passed in the Third Year of the Reign of His late Majesty King George the First, for laying a Duty of Two Pennies Scots, or one Sixth Part of a Penny Sterling, on every Pint of Ale or Beer, that shall be vended or sold within the Town of Dumfries, and Privileges thereof, for paying the Debts of the said Town; and for building a Church, and making a Harbour there; and for laying a Duty on the Tonnage of Shipping, and a Duty on Goods imported and exported into and out of the Port of the said Town, for the better repairing of the said Harbour.
- Citation: 10 Geo. 2. c. 7
- Territorial extent: Great Britain

Dates
- Royal assent: 22 April 1737
- Commencement: 1 February 1737
- Repealed: 30 July 1948
Other legislation
Amends	Dumfries Beer Duties Act 1716
Amended by	Dumfries Beer Duties Act 1762; Dumfries Beer Duties Act 1787; Dumfries Two Pennies Scots Act 1811
Repealed by	Statute Law Revision Act 1948

Status: Repealed

Text of statute as originally enacted

- Dumfries Beer Duties Act 1736 (10 Geo. 2. c. 7)

Dumfries Beer Duties Act 1762
- Act of Parliament
- Parliament of Great Britain
- Long title: An Act for continuing and rendering more effectual an Act, passed in the Tenth Year of His late Majesty King George the Second, intituled, "An Act for continuing an Act passed in the Third Year of the Reign of His Majesty King George the First, for laying a Duty of Two Pennies Scots, or One Sixth Part of a Penny Sterling, on every Pint of Ale or Beer that shall be vended or sold within the Town of Dumfries and Privileges thereof, for paying the Debts of the said Town; and for building a Church, and making a Harbour there;" and for laying a Duty on the Tonnage of Shipping, and a Duty on Goods imported and exported into and out of the Port of the said Town, for the better repairing of the said Harbour.
- Citation: 2 Geo. 3. c. 55
- Territorial extent: Great Britain

Dates
- Royal assent: 8 April 1762
- Commencement: 3 November 1761
- Repealed: 30 July 1948
Other legislation
Amends	Dumfries Beer Duties Act 1716; Dumfries Beer Duties Act 1736
Amended by	Dumfries Beer Duties Act 1787; Dumfries Two Pennies Scots Act 1811
Repealed by	Statute Law Revision Act 1948

Status: Repealed

Text of statute as originally enacted

- Dumfries Beer Duties Act 1762 (2 Geo. 3. c. 55)

Dumfries Beer Duties Act 1787
- Act of Parliament
- Parliament of Great Britain
- Long title: An Act for continuing and amending several Acts, made in the Third Year of the Reign of King George the First, the Tenth Year of the Reign of King George the Second, and the Second Year of the Reign of His present Majesty, for laying a Duty of Two Pennies Scots, or One-sixth Part of a Penny Sterling, on every Pint of Ale or Beer, that shall be vended, or sold, within the Town of Dumfries and Privileges thereof; for paying the Debts of the said Town, and for building a Church and making a Harbour there, and for laying a Duty on the Tonnage of Shipping, and a Duty on Goods imported and exported into and out of the Port of the said Town, for the better repairing of the said Harbour; and for paving, cleansing, lighting, and watching the Streets and other Public Places within the said Town, and widening the Streets where necessary, and removing and preventing Nuisances therein.
- Citation: 27 Geo. 3. c. 57
- Territorial extent: Great Britain

Dates
- Royal assent: 28 May 1787
- Commencement: 23 January 1787
- Repealed: 30 July 1948
Other legislation
Amends	Dumfries Beer Duties Act 1716; Dumfries Beer Duties Act 1736; Dumfries Beer Duties Act 1762
Amended by	Dumfries Two Pennies Scots Act 1811
Repealed by	Statute Law Revision Act 1948

Status: Repealed

Text of statute as originally enacted

- Dumfries Beer Duties Act 1787 (27 Geo. 3. c. 57)

Dumfries Two Pennies Scots Act 1811
- Act of Parliament
- Parliament of the United Kingdom
- Long title: An Act for continuing several Acts for laying a Duty of Two Pennies Scots, or One Sixth Part of a Penny Sterling, on every Pint of Ale, Beer or Porter, that shall be Tended or sold within the Town of Dumfries and Privileges thereof.
- Citation: 51 Geo. 3. c. xxxvii
- Territorial extent: United Kingdom

Dates
- Royal assent: 6 May 1811
- Commencement: 6 May 1811
- Repealed: 31 January 2013
Other legislation
Amends	Dumfries Beer Duties Act 1716; Dumfries Beer Duties Act 1736; Dumfries Beer Duties Act 1762; Dumfries Beer Duties Act 1787
Repealed by	Statute Law (Repeals) Act 2013

Status: Repealed

Text of statute as originally enacted

- Dumfries Two Pennies Scots Act 1811 (51 Geo. 3. c. xxxvii)

=== Dunbar ===
In Dunbar, acts of Parliament were passed in 1719, 1737 and 1764.

Dunbar Beer Duties Act 1718
- Act of Parliament
- Parliament of Great Britain
- Long title: An Act for laying a Duty of Two Pennies Scotts, or One Sixth Part of a Penny Sterling, upon every Pint of Ale or Beer that shall be vended or sold within the Town of Dunbar, for improving and preserving the Harbour, and repairing the Town House, and building a School, and other Public Buildings there, and for supplying the said Town with fresh Water.
- Citation: 5 Geo. 1. c. 16
- Territorial extent: Great Britain

Dates
- Royal assent: 18 April 1719
- Commencement: 11 November 1718
- Repealed: 30 July 1948
Other legislation
Amended by	Dunbar Beer Duties Act 1736
Repealed by	Statute Law Revision Act 1948
Relates to	Inverness Beer Duties Act 1718; Dunbar Beer Duties Act 1764

Status: Repealed

Text of statute as originally enacted

- Dunbar Beer Duties Act 1718 (5 Geo. 1. c. 16)

Dunbar Beer Duties Act 1736
- Act of Parliament
- Parliament of Great Britain
- Long title: An Act for continuing an Act passed in the Fifth Year of the Reign of His late Majesty King George the First, intituled, "An Act for laying a Duty of Two Pennies Scots, or One Sixth Part of a Penny Sterling, upon every Pint of Ale or Beer that shall be vended or sold within the Town of Dunbar, for improving and preserving the Harbour, and repairing the Town House, and building a School and other Public Buildings there, and for supplying the said Town with fresh Water."
- Citation: 10 Geo. 2. c. 4
- Territorial extent: Great Britain

Dates
- Royal assent: 21 March 1737
- Commencement: 1 February 1737
- Repealed: 30 July 1948
Other legislation
Amends	Dunbar Beer Duties Act 1718
Amended by	Dunbar Beer Duties Act 1764
Repealed by	Statute Law Revision Act 1948

Status: Repealed

Text of statute as originally enacted

- Dunbar Beer Duties Act 1736 (10 Geo. 2. c. 4)

Dunbar Beer Duties Act 1764
- Act of Parliament
- Parliament of Great Britain
- Long title: An Act to continue an Act passed in the Tenth Year of the Reign of His late Majesty King George the Second, for continuing an Act passed in the Fifth Year of the Reign of His late Majesty King George the First, intituled, "An Act for laying a Duty of Two Pennies Scots, or One Sixth Part of a Penny Sterling, upon every Pint of Ale or Beer that shall be vended or sold within the Town of Dunbar; for improving and preserving the Harbour, and repairing the Town-house, and building a School and other public Buildings there; and for supplying the said Town with fresh Water."
- Citation: 4 Geo. 3. c. 46
- Territorial extent: Great Britain

Dates
- Royal assent: 21 March 1764
- Commencement: 15 November 1763
- Repealed: 30 July 1948
Other legislation
Amends	Dunbar Beer Duties Act 1736
Repealed by	Statute Law Revision Act 1948
Relates to	Dunbar Beer Duties Act 1718

Status: Repealed

Text of statute as originally enacted

- Dunbar Beer Duties Act 1764 (4 Geo. 3. c. 46)

=== Dundee ===
In Dundee, acts of Parliament were passed in 1707, 1731 1747, 1776, 1802 and 1827.

Dundee Beer Duties Act 1707
- Act of Parliament
- Parliament of Scotland
- Long title: Act in favours of the Town of Dundee for an Imposition upon Ale and Beer.
- Citation: 1707 c. 80 (S)
- Territorial extent: Scotland

Dates
- Royal assent: 25 March 1707
Other legislation
Amended by	Dundee Beer Duties Act 1730; Dundee Beer Duties Act 1746; Dundee Beer Duties Act 1776; Dundee Two Pennies Scots Act 1802; Dundee Two Pennies Scots Act 1827

- Dundee Beer Duties Act 1707 (c. 80 (S))

Dundee Beer Duties Act 1730
- Act of Parliament
- Parliament of Great Britain
- Long title: An Act for continuing the Duty of Two Pennies Scots, or One Sixth Part of a Penny Sterling, upon every Pint of Ale and Beer that shall be vended or sold within the Town of Dundee, and Privileges thereof, for paying the public Debts of the said Town, repairing the Harbour there, and for other Purposes therein mentioned.
- Citation: 4 Geo. 2. c. 11
- Territorial extent: Great Britain

Dates
- Royal assent: 7 May 1731
- Commencement: 25 March 1731
- Repealed: 30 July 1948
Other legislation
Amends	Dundee Beer Duties Act 1707
Amended by	Dundee Beer Duties Act 1746; Dundee Beer Duties Act 1776; Dundee Two Pennies Scots Act 1802; Dundee Two Pennies Scots Act 1827
Repealed by	Statute Law Revision Act 1948

Status: Repealed

Text of statute as originally enacted

- Dundee Beer Duties Act 1730 (4 Geo. 2. c. 11)

Dundee Beer Duties Act 1746
- Act of Parliament
- Parliament of Great Britain
- Long title: An Act for enlarging the Term and Powers granted by Two Acts of Parliament, for laying a Duty of Two Penny Scots upon every Pint of Ale and Beer brewed and vended within the Town of Dundee, and the Liberties and Suburbs thereof, for the Purposes in the said Acts and this present Act mentioned.
- Citation: 20 Geo. 2. c. 17
- Territorial extent: Great Britain

Dates
- Royal assent: 17 June 1747
- Commencement: 18 November 1746
- Repealed: 30 July 1948
Other legislation
Amends	Dundee Beer Duties Act 1707; Dundee Beer Duties Act 1730
Amended by	Dundee Beer Duties Act 1776; Dundee Two Pennies Scots Act 1802; Dundee Two Pennies Scots Act 1827
Repealed by	Statute Law Revision Act 1948

Status: Repealed

Text of statute as originally enacted

- Dundee Beer Duties Act 1746 (20 Geo. 2. c. 17)

Dundee Beer Duties Act 1776
- Act of Parliament
- Parliament of Great Britain
- Long title: An Act for enlarging the Term and Powers granted by Three Acts of Parliament, for laying a Duty of Two Pennies Scots upon every Pint of Ale and Beer brewed and vended within the Town of Dundee, and the Liberties and Suburbs thereof, for the Purposes in the said Acts mentioned.
- Citation: 16 Geo. 3. c. 16
- Territorial extent: Great Britain

Dates
- Royal assent: 22 March 1776
- Commencement: 26 October 1775
- Repealed: 30 July 1948
Other legislation
Amends	Dundee Beer Duties Act 1707; Dundee Beer Duties Act 1730; Dundee Beer Duties Act 1746
Amended by	Dundee Two Pennies Scots Act 1802; Dundee Two Pennies Scots Act 1827
Repealed by	Statute Law Revision Act 1948

Status: Repealed

Text of statute as originally enacted

- Dundee Beer Duties Act 1776 (16 Geo. 3. c. 16)

Dundee Two Pennies Scots Act 1802
- Act of Parliament
- Parliament of the United Kingdom
- Long title: An Act for enlarging the Term and Powers granted by several Acts for laying a Duty of Two Pennies Scots upon every Pint of Ale and Beer brewed and vended within the Town of Dundee, and the Liberties and Suburbs thereof.
- Citation: 42 Geo. 3. c. xxvii
- Territorial extent: Great Britain

Dates
- Royal assent: 15 April 1802
- Commencement: 1 May 1802
- Repealed: 31 January 2013
Other legislation
Amends	Dundee Beer Duties Act 1707; Dundee Beer Duties Act 1730; Dundee Beer Duties Act 1746; Dundee Beer Duties Act 1776
Amended by	Dundee Two Pennies Scots Act 1827
Repealed by	Statute Law (Repeals) Act 2013

Status: Repealed

Text of statute as originally enacted

- Dundee Two Pennies Scots Act 1802 (42 Geo. 3. c. xxvii)

Dundee Two Pennies Scots Act 1827
- Act of Parliament
- Parliament of the United Kingdom
- Long title: An Act for enlarging the Term and Powers granted by several Acts for levying a Duty of Two Pennies Scots upon every Pint of Ale and Beer brewed or vended within the Town of Dundee, and the Liberties and Suburbs thereof, and for amending the said Acts.
- Citation: 7 & 8 Geo. 4. c. xciii
- Territorial extent: Great Britain

Dates
- Royal assent: 14 June 1827
- Commencement: 14 June 1827
- Repealed: 31 January 2013
Other legislation
Amends	Dundee Beer Duties Act 1707; Dundee Beer Duties Act 1730; Dundee Beer Duties Act 1746; Dundee Beer Duties Act 1776; Dundee Two Pennies Scots Act 1802
Repealed by	Statute Law (Repeals) Act 2013

Status: Repealed

Text of statute as originally enacted

- Dundee Two Pennies Scots Act 1827 (7 & 8 Geo. 4. c. xciii)

=== Dysart ===
In Dysart, acts of Parliament were passed in 1696 and 1753.

Dysart Beer Duties Act 1695
- Act of Parliament
- Parliament of Scotland
- Long title: Act in favours of the Burgh of Dysart for ane Imposition on Ale & Beer.
- Citation: 1695 c. 89 (S)
- Territorial extent: Scotland

Dates
- Royal assent: 17 July 1695

- Dysart Beer Duties Act 1695 (c. 89 (S))

Dysart Beer Duties Act 1753
- Act of Parliament
- Parliament of Great Britain
- Long title: An Act for laying a Duty of Two Pennies Scots, or One Sixth Part of a Penny Sterling, on every Scots Pint of Ale and Beer, which shall be brewed for Sale, brought into, tapped, or sold, within the Town of Dysart and Liberties thereof, and all Places adjacent, lying within Three Hundred Yards of the Boundaries of the said Liberties, for the repairing, improving, and preserving, the Harbour of the said Town.
- Citation: 26 Geo. 2. c. 44
- Territorial extent: Great Britain

Dates
- Royal assent: 17 April 1753
- Commencement: 11 January 1753
- Repealed: 30 July 194
Other legislation
Repealed by	Statute Law Revision Act 1948

Status: Repealed

Text of statute as originally enacted

- Dysart Beer Duties Act 1753 (26 Geo. 2. c. 44)

=== Edinburgh ===
In Edinburgh, acts of Parliament were passed in 1717, 1723, 1752, 1798 and 1816.

Edinburgh Beer Duties Act 1716
- Act of Parliament
- Parliament of Great Britain
- Long title: An act for continuing the duty of two pennies Scots, or one sixth part of a penny sterling, on every pint of ale and beer that shall he vended or sold within the city of Edinburgh and privileges thereof, for the benefit of the said city, and for discontinuing the payment of the dues commonly called the petty-port customs at Edinburgh, during the continuance of this act.
- Citation: 3 Geo. 1. c. 5
- Territorial extent: Great Britain

Dates
- Royal assent: 22 June 1717
- Commencement: 20 February 1717
- Repealed: 30 July 1948
Other legislation
Amended by	Edinburgh Beer Duties Act 1722; Edinburgh Beer Duties Act 1751; Edinburgh Two Pennies Scots Act 1816
Repealed by	Statute Law Revision Act 1948
Relates to	Dumfries Beer Duties Act 1716; Edinburgh Two Pennies Scots Act 1798

Status: Repealed

Text of statute as originally enacted

- Edinburgh Beer Duties Act 1716 (3 Geo. 1. c. 5)

Edinburgh Beer Duties Act 1722
- Act of Parliament
- Parliament of Great Britain
- Long title: An Act for enlarging the Term granted by an Act made in the Third Year of His Majesty's Reign, (for continuing the Duty of Two Pennies Scots upon every Pint of Ale and Beer sold in the City of Edinburgh, for the Purposes therein mentioned; and for discontinuing Payment of the Petty Port Customs there;) and for making the said Act more effectual.
- Citation: 9 Geo. 1. c. 14
- Territorial extent: Great Britain

Dates
- Royal assent: 10 April 1723
- Commencement: 9 October 1722
- Repealed: 30 July 1948
Other legislation
Amends	Edinburgh Beer Duties Act 1716
Amended by	Edinburgh Beer Duties Act 1751; Edinburgh Two Pennies Scots Act 1816
Repealed by	Statute Law Revision Act 1948
Relates to	Edinburgh Two Pennies Scots Act 1798

Status: Repealed

Text of statute as originally enacted

- Edinburgh Beer Duties Act 1722 (9 Geo. 1. c. 14)

Edinburgh Beer Duties Act 1751
- Act of Parliament
- Parliament of Great Britain
- Long title: An Act for enlarging the Term granted by Two several Acts of the Third and Ninth Years of His late Majesty's Reign, for continuing the Duty of Two Pennies Scots upon every Pint of Ale and Beer sold in the City of Edinburgh, for the Purposes therein mentioned, and for discontinuing Payment of the Petty Port Customs there.
- Citation: 25 Geo. 2. c. 9
- Territorial extent: Great Britain

Dates
- Royal assent: 26 March 1752
- Commencement: 14 November 1751
- Repealed: 30 July 1948
Other legislation
Amends	Edinburgh Beer Duties Act 1716Edinburgh Beer Duties Act 1722
Amended by	Edinburgh Two Pennies Scots Act 1798; Edinburgh Two Pennies Scots Act 1816
Repealed by	Statute Law Revision Act 1948

Status: Repealed

Text of statute as originally enacted

- Edinburgh Beer Duties Act 1751 (25 Geo. 2. c. 9)

Edinburgh Two Pennies Scots Act 1798
- Act of Parliament
- Parliament of Great Britain
- Long title: An act for further continuing for thirty-eight years the term granted by an act of the twenty-fifth year of the reign of his late majesty King George the Second, for continuing the duty of two pennies Scots upon every pint of ale and beer sold in the city of Edinburgh, and places adjacent, for the purposes therein mentioned; and for explaining and amending the said act.
- Citation: 38 Geo. 3. c. liv
- Territorial extent: Great Britain

Dates
- Royal assent: 1 June 1798
- Commencement: 2 November 1797
- Repealed: 31 January 2013
Other legislation
Amends	Edinburgh Beer Duties Act 1751
Amended by	Edinburgh Two Pennies Scots Act 1816
Repealed by	Statute Law (Repeals) Act 2013
Relates to	Edinburgh Beer Duties Act 1716Edinburgh Beer Duties Act 1722

Status: Repealed

Text of statute as originally enacted

- Edinburgh Two Pennies Scots Act 1798 (38 Geo. 3. c. liv)

Edinburgh Two Pennies Scots Act 1816
- Act of Parliament
- Parliament of the United Kingdom
- Long title: An Act for altering and amending several Acts in regard to the Duty of Two Pennies Scots upon every Pint of Ale and Beer sold in the City of Edinburgh and Places adjacent.
- Citation: 56 Geo. 3. c. xxxv
- Territorial extent: Scotland

Dates
- Royal assent: 31 May 1816
- Commencement: 31 May 1816
- Repealed: 31 January 2013
Other legislation
Amends	Edinburgh Beer Duties Act 1716; Edinburgh Beer Duties Act 1722; Edinburgh Beer Duties Act 1751; Edinburgh Two Pennies Scots Act 1798
Repealed by	Statute Law (Repeals) Act 2013

Status: Repealed

Text of statute as originally enacted

- Edinburgh Two Pennies Scots Act 1816 (56 Geo. 3. c. xxxv)

=== Elgin ===
In Elgin, an act of Parliament was passed in 1722.

Elgin Beer Duties Act 1721
- Act of Parliament
- Parliament of Great Britain
- Long title: An Act for laying a Duty of Two Pennies Scots, or one Sixth Part of a Penny Sterling, upon every Scots Pint of Ale or Beer that shall be brewed for Sale, vended, or tapped, within the Town of Elgin, and Privileges thereof, for paying the public Debts of the said Town, and for other the Purposes therein mentioned.
- Citation: 8 Geo. 1. c. 7
- Territorial extent: Great Britain

Dates
- Royal assent: 12 February 1722
- Commencement: 25 March 1722
- Repealed: 30 July 1948
Other legislation
Repealed by	Statute Law Revision Act 1948

Status: Repealed

Text of statute as originally enacted

- Elgin Beer Duties Act 1721 (8 Geo. 1. c. 7)

=== Glasgow ===
In Glasgow and Gorbals, acts of Parliament were passed in 1705, 1716, 1726, 1736, 1755 and 1799.

Glasgow Beer Duties Act 1705
- Act of Parliament
- Parliament of Scotland
- Long title: Act in favors of the Toun of Glasgow for an Imposition of two pennies on the pint of ale and beer.
- Citation: 1705 c. 54 (S)
- Territorial extent: Scotland

Dates
- Royal assent: 21 September 1705
Other legislation
Amended by	Glasgow Beer Duties Act 1715; Glasgow Beer Duties Act 1735

- Glasgow Beer Duties Act 1705 (c. 54 (S))

Glasgow Beer Duties Act 1715
- Act of Parliament
- Parliament of Great Britain
- Long title: An Act for the continuing the Duty of Two Pennies Scots, or One Sixth of a Penny Sterling, on every Pint of Ale and Beer that shall be vended or sold within the City of Glasgow and Privilege thereof, for the Benefit of the said City.
- Citation: 1 Geo. 1. St. 2. c. 44
- Territorial extent: Great Britain

Dates
- Royal assent: 26 June 1716
- Commencement: 21 September 1716
- Repealed: 30 July 1948
Other legislation
Amends	Glasgow Beer Duties Act 1705
Amended by	Glasgow Beer Duties Act 1725; Glasgow Beer Duties Act 1735
Repealed by	Statute Law Revision Act 1948

Status: Repealed

Text of statute as originally enacted

- Glasgow Beer Duties Act 1715 (1 Geo. 1. St. 2. c. 44)

Glasgow Beer Duties Act 1725
- Act of Parliament
- Parliament of Great Britain
- Long title: An Act for vesting in His Majesty an Imposition of Two Pennies Scots upon all Ale and Beer brewed and sold in the City of Glasgow and Privileges thereof, for satisfying the Damages and Losses which Daniel Campbell Esquire lately suffered in a Riot there.
- Citation: 12 Geo. 1. c. 27
- Territorial extent: Great Britain

Dates
- Royal assent: 24 May 1726
- Commencement: 24 June 1726
- Repealed: 30 July 1948
Other legislation
Amends	Glasgow Beer Duties Act 1715
Amended by	Glasgow Beer Duties Act 1735
Repealed by	Statute Law Revision Act 1948
Relates to	Glasgow Beer Duties Act 1705

Status: Repealed

Text of statute as originally enacted

- Glasgow Beer Duties Act 1725 (12 Geo. 1. c. 27)

Glasgow Beer Duties Act 1735
- Act of Parliament
- Parliament of Great Britain
- Long title: An Act for continuing the Duty of Two Pennies Scots, or One Sixth of a Penny Sterling, on every Pint of Ale and Beer that shall be vended or sold within the City of Glasgow; and for extending the same over the Villages of Gorbells and Port Glasgow, and Privileges thereof, for the Benefit of the said City and Villages.
- Citation: 9 Geo. 2. c. 31
- Territorial extent: Great Britain

Dates
- Royal assent: 20 May 1736
- Commencement: 1 November 1738 (Note: Section 1.)
- Repealed: 30 July 1948
Other legislation
Amends	Glasgow Beer Duties Act 1705; Glasgow Beer Duties Act 1715; Glasgow Beer Duties Act 1725
Amended by	Glasgow Beer Duties Act 1755
Repealed by	Statute Law Revision Act 1948

Status: Repealed

Text of statute as originally enacted

- Glasgow Beer Duties Act 1735 (9 Geo. 2. c. 31)

Glasgow Beer Duties Act 1755
- Act of Parliament
- Parliament of Great Britain
- Long title: An Act for continuing, and rendering more effectual, an Act passed in the Ninth Year of the Reign of His present Majesty, intituled, "An Act for continuing the Duty of Two Pennies Scots, or One Sixth of a Penny Sterling, on every Pint of Ale and Beer that shall be vended or sold within the City of Glasgow; and for extending the same over the Villages of Gorbells and Port Glasgow, and Privileges thereof, for the Benefit of the said City and Villages."
- Citation: 28 Geo. 2. c. 29
- Territorial extent: Great Britain

Dates
- Royal assent: 20 March 1755
- Commencement: 14 November 1754
- Repealed: 30 July 1948
Other legislation
Amends	Glasgow Beer Duties Act 1735
Amended by	Glasgow and Gorbals Two Pennies Scots Act 1799
Repealed by	Statute Law Revision Act 1948

Status: Repealed

Text of statute as originally enacted

- Glasgow Beer Duties Act 1755 (28 Geo. 2. c. 29)

Glasgow and Gorbals Two Pennies Scots Act 1799
- Act of Parliament
- Parliament of Great Britain
- Long title: An act for continuing for thirty-eight years, and rendering more effectual an act passed in the twenty-eighth year of the reign of his late Majesty, for continuing the duty of two pennies Scots, of one sixth part of a penny sterling, on every pint of ale and beer vended or sold within the city of Glasgow and village of Gorbals, and liberties and privileges thereof.
- Citation: 39 Geo. 3. c. xl
- Territorial extent: Great Britain

Dates
- Royal assent: 13 June 1799
- Commencement: 20 November 1798
- Repealed: 31 January 2013
Other legislation
Amends	Glasgow Beer Duties Act 1755
Repealed by	Statute Law (Repeals) Act 2013

Status: Repealed

Text of statute as originally enacted

- Glasgow and Gorbals Two Pennies Scots Act 1799 (39 Geo. 3. c. xl)

=== Greenock ===
In Greenock, an act of Parliament was passed in 1751.

Greenock Beer Duties Act 1750
- Act of Parliament
- Parliament of Great Britain
- Long title: An Act for levying a Duty of Two Pennies Scots, or a Sixth Part of a Penny Sterling, on every Scots Pint of Ale and Beer, which shall be brewed for Sale, brought into, tapped, or sold, within the Town of Greenock, and Baronies of Easter and Wester Greenock and Finnart, and Liberties thereof, in the County of Renfrew, for repairing the Harbour of the said Town, and for other Purposes therein mentioned.
- Citation: 24 Geo. 2. c. 38
- Territorial extent: Great Britain

Dates
- Royal assent: 22 May 1751
- Commencement: 17 January 1751 (Note: Start of session.)
- Repealed: 30 July 1948
Other legislation
Repealed by	Statute Law Revision Act 1948

Status: Repealed

Text of statute as originally enacted

- Greenock Beer Duties Act 1750 (24 Geo. 2. c. 38)

=== Inverness ===
In Inverness, acts of Parliament were passed in 1719 and 1738.

Inverness Beer Duties Act 1718
- Act of Parliament
- Parliament of Great Britain
- Long title: An Act for laying a Duty of Two Pennies Scotts, or One Sixth Part of a Penny Sterling, upon every Pint of Ale or Beer that shall be vended or sold within the Town of Inverness, and Privileges thereof, for paying the Debts of the said Town; and for building a Church, and making a Harbour there.
- Citation: 5 Geo. 1. c. 17
- Territorial extent: Great Britain

Dates
- Royal assent: 18 April 1719
- Commencement: 11 November 1718
- Repealed: 30 July 1948
Other legislation
Amended by	Inverness Beer Duties Act 1737
Repealed by	Statute Law Revision Act 1948
Relates to	Dunbar Beer Duties Act 1718

Status: Repealed

Text of statute as originally enacted

- Inverness Beer Duties Act 1718 (5 Geo. 1. c. 17)

Inverness Beer Duties Act 1737
- Act of Parliament
- Parliament of Great Britain
- Long title: An Act for continuing the Duty of Two Pennies Scots, or One Sixth Part of a Penny Sterling, on each Pint of Ale and Beer that shall be vended or sold within the Town of Inverness and Privileges thereof, for paying the Debts of the said Town; and other Purposes therein mentioned.
- Citation: 11 Geo. 2. c. 16
- Territorial extent: Great Britain

Dates
- Royal assent: 20 May 1738
- Commencement: 24 January 1738
- Repealed: 30 July 1948
Other legislation
Amends	Inverness Beer Duties Act 1718
Repealed by	Statute Law Revision Act 1948

Status: Repealed

Text of statute as originally enacted

- Inverness Beer Duties Act 1737 (11 Geo. 2. c. 16)

=== Irvine ===
In Irvine, an act of Parliament was passed in 1736.

Irvine Beer Duties Act 1735
- Act of Parliament
- Parliament of Great Britain
- Long title: An Act for laying a Duty of Two Pennies Scots, or One Sixth Part of a Penny Sterling, upon every Scots Pint of Ale and Beer brewed or brought into and sold within the Town of Irvine and Liberties thereof; and for laying a Duty of One Penny Sterling upon every Ton, or Ten Horse-loads, of Coals carried to the Harbour of the said Town, and shipped there for Transportation.
- Citation: 9 Geo. 2. c. 27
- Territorial extent: Great Britain

Dates
- Royal assent: 5 May 1736
- Commencement: 24 June 1736
- Expired: 24 June 1755
- Repealed: 30 July 1948
Other legislation
Repealed by	Statute Law Revision Act 1948

Status: Repealed

Text of statute as originally enacted

- Irvine Beer Duties Act 1735 (9 Geo. 2. c. 27)

=== Jedburgh ===
In Jedburgh, an act of Parliament was passed in 1721.

Jedburgh Beer Duties Act 1720
- Act of Parliament
- Parliament of Great Britain
- Long title: An Act for laying a Duty of Two Pennies Scots, or One Sixth Part of a Penny Sterling, upon every Scots Pint of Ale or Beer that shall be brewed for Sale, vended, or tapped, within the Town of Jedburgh, and Privileges thereof, for paying the public Debts of the said Town, and for supplying the same with fresh Water; and for other Purposes therein mentioned.
- Citation: 7 Geo. 1. St. 1. c. 25
- Territorial extent: Great Britain

Dates
- Royal assent: 24 June 1721
- Commencement: 24 June 1721
- Repealed: 30 July 1948
Other legislation
Repealed by	Statute Law Revision Act 1948

Status: Repealed

Text of statute as originally enacted

- Jedburgh Beer Duties Act 1720 (7 Geo. 1. St. 1. c. 25)

=== Kelso ===
In Kelso, acts of Parliament were passed in 1759, 1780, 1802 and 1824.

Kelso Beer Duties Act 1758
- Act of Parliament
- Parliament of Great Britain
- Long title: An Act for laying a Duty of Two Pennies Scots, or One Sixth Part of a Penny Sterling, upon every Scots Pint of Ale, Porter, and Beer, which shall be brewed for Sale, brought into, tapped, or sold, within the Town of Kelso in the Shire of Roxburgh, for finishing a Bridge cross the River Tweed; and for other Purposes therein mentioned.
- Citation: 32 Geo. 2. c. 56
- Territorial extent: Great Britain

Dates
- Royal assent: 2 June 1759
- Commencement: 23 November 1758
- Repealed: 30 July 1948
Other legislation
Amended by	Kelso Beer Duties Act 1780; Kelso Two Pennies Scots Act 1802; Kelso Two Pennies Scots Act 1824
Repealed by	Statute Law Revision Act 1948

Status: Repealed

Text of statute as originally enacted

- Kelso Beer Duties Act 1758 (32 Geo. 2. c. 56)

Kelso Beer Duties Act 1780
- Act of Parliament
- Parliament of Great Britain
- Long title: An Act for continuing the Term and Powers of an Act, made in the Thirty-second Year of the Reign of His late Majesty King George the Second, intituled, "An Act for laying a Duty of Two Pennies Scots, or One Sixth Part of a Penny Sterling, upon every Scots Pint of Ale, Porter and Beer, which shall be brewed for Sale, brought into, tapped or sold, within the Town of Kelso, in the Shire of Roxburgh, for finishing a Bridge cross the River Tweed; and for other Purposes therein mentioned."
- Citation: 20 Geo. 3. c. 11
- Territorial extent: Great Britain

Dates
- Royal assent: 21 March 1780
- Commencement: 25 November 1779
- Repealed: 30 July 1948
Other legislation
Amends	Kelso Beer Duties Act 1758
Amended by	Kelso Two Pennies Scots Act 1802; Kelso Two Pennies Scots Act 1824
Repealed by	Statute Law Revision Act 1948

Status: Repealed

Text of statute as originally enacted

- Kelso Beer Duties Act 1780 (20 Geo. 3. c. 11)

Kelso Two Pennies Scots Act 1802
- Act of Parliament
- Parliament of the United Kingdom
- Long title: An Act for continuing and enlarging the Term and Powers of Two several Acts, of the Thirty-second Year of the Reign of His late Majesty, and of the Twentieth Year of His present Majesty, charging a Duty of Two-pennies Scots, or One Sixth Part of a Penny Sterling, upon every Scots Pint of Ale, Porter, and Beer, brewed for Sale, brought into, tapped, or sold, within the Town and Parish of Kelso, in the County of Roxburgh, for the Purposes therein mentioned.
- Citation: 42 Geo. 3. c. xxxiii
- Territorial extent: United Kingdom

Dates
- Royal assent: 30 April 1802
- Commencement: 30 April 1802
- Repealed: 31 January 2013
Other legislation
Amends	Kelso Beer Duties Act 1758; Kelso Beer Duties Act 1780
Amended by	Kelso Two Pennies Scots Act 1824
Repealed by	Statute Law (Repeals) Act 2013

Status: Repealed

Text of statute as originally enacted

- Kelso Two Pennies Scots Act 1802 (42 Geo. 3. c. xxxiii)

Kelso Two Pennies Scots Act 1824
- Act of Parliament
- Parliament of the United Kingdom
- Long title: An Act for continuing and enlarging the Term and Powers of several Acts passed in the Thirty second Year of the Reign of King George the Second, and the Twentieth and Forty second Years of His late Majesty King George the Third, charging a Duty of Two Pennies Scots, or One sixth Part of a Penny Sterling, upon every Scots Pint of Ale, Porter and Beer brewed for Sale, brought into, tapped or sold within the Town and Parish of Kelso in the County of Roxburgh, for the Purposes therein mentioned.
- Citation: 5 Geo. 4. c. xxxviii
- Territorial extent: United Kingdom

Dates
- Royal assent: 15 April 1824
- Commencement: 15 April 1824
- Repealed: 31 January 2013
Other legislation
Amends	Kelso Beer Duties Act 1758; Kelso Beer Duties Act 1780; Kelso Two Pennies Scots Act 1802
Repealed by	Statute Law (Repeals) Act 2013

Status: Repealed

- Kelso Two Pennies Scots Act 1824 (5 Geo. 4. c. xxxviii)

=== Kinghorn ===
In Kinghorn, acts of Parliament were passed in 1707, 1749, 1774 and 1807.

Kinghorn Beer Duties Act 1707
- Act of Parliament
- Parliament of Scotland
- Long title: Act in favours of the Burgh of Kinghorn for an Imposition on Ale and Beer.
- Citation: 1707 c. 85 (S)
- Territorial extent: Scotland

Dates
- Royal assent: 25 March 1707

- Kinghorn Beer Duties Act 1707 (c. 85 (S))

Kinghorn Beer Duties Act 1748
- Act of Parliament
- Parliament of Great Britain
- Long title: An Act for laying a Duty of Two Pennies Scots, or One Sixth Part of a Penny Sterling, upon every Scots Pint of Ale and Beer, which shall be brewed for Sale, brought into, tapped, or sold, within the Town of Kinghorn and Liberties thereof.
- Citation: 22 Geo. 2. c. 13
- Territorial extent: Great Britain

Dates
- Royal assent: 22 March 1749
- Commencement: 29 November 1748
- Expired: 29 November 1779
- Repealed: 30 July 1948
Other legislation
Amended by	Kinghorn Beer Duties Act 1774; Kinghorn Two Pennies Scots Act 1807
Repealed by	Statute Law Revision Act 1948
Relates to	Anstruther Easter Beer Duties Act 1748

Status: Repealed

Text of statute as originally enacted

- Kinghorn Beer Duties Act 1748 (22 Geo. 2. c. 13)

Kinghorn Beer Duties Act 1774
- Act of Parliament
- Parliament of Great Britain
- Long title: An Act to continue an Act, made in the Twenty-second Year of the Reign of His late Majesty King George the Second, for laying a Duty of Two Pennies Scots, or One Sixth Part of a Penny Sterling, upon every Scots Pint of Ale and Beer which shall be brewed for Sale, brought into, tapped, or sold, within the Town of Kinghorn, and Liberties thereof.
- Citation: 14 Geo. 3. c. 28
- Territorial extent: Great Britain

Dates
- Royal assent: 5 May 1774
- Commencement: 13 January 1774
- Repealed: 30 July 1948
Other legislation
Amends	Kinghorn Beer Duties Act 1748
Amended by	Kinghorn Two Pennies Scots Act 1807
Repealed by	Statute Law Revision Act 1948

Status: Repealed

Text of statute as originally enacted

- Kinghorn Beer Duties Act 1774 (14 Geo. 3. c. 28)

Kinghorn Two Pennies Scots Act 1807
- Act of Parliament
- Parliament of the United Kingdom
- Long title: An Act to revive and continue the Term and enlarge the Powers of Two Acts, of the Twenty-second Year of His late Majesty, and the Fourteenth Year of His present Majesty, for laying a Duty of Two Pennies Scots, or One sixth Part of a Penny Sterling, upon every Scots Pint of Ale or Beer brewed for Sale, brought into, tapped, or sold in the Burgh of Kinghorn, in the County of Fife.
- Citation: 47 Geo. 3 Sess. 2. c. xlii
- Territorial extent: United Kingdom

Dates
- Royal assent: 1 August 1807
- Commencement: 1 August 1807
- Repealed: 31 January 2013
Other legislation
Amends	Kinghorn Beer Duties Act 1748; Kinghorn Beer Duties Act 1774
Repealed by	Statute Law (Repeals) Act 2013

Status: Repealed

- Kinghorn Two Pennies Scots Act 1807 (47 Geo. 3 Sess. 2. c. xlii)

=== Kirkcaldy ===
In Kirkcaldy, acts of Parliament were passed in 1707, 1742, 1758 and 1791.

Kirkcaldy Beer Duties Act 1707
- Act of Parliament
- Parliament of Scotland
- Long title: Act in favours of the Burgh of Kirkcaldy for an Imposition on Ale and Beer.
- Citation: 1707 c. 83 (S)
- Territorial extent: Scotland

Dates
- Royal assent: 25 March 1707

- Kirkcaldy Beer Duties Act 1707 (c. 83 (S))

Kirkcaldy Beer Duties Act 1741
- Act of Parliament
- Parliament of Great Britain
- Long title: An Act for laying a Duty of Two Pennies Scots, or One Sixth Part of a Penny Sterling, upon every Scots Pint of Ale and Beer, which shall be brewed for Sale, brought into, tapped, or sold, within the Town of Kircaldy, and Liberties thereof.
- Citation: 15 Geo. 2. c. 8
- Territorial extent: Great Britain

Dates
- Royal assent: 15 April 1742
- Commencement: 1 December 1741
- Repealed: 30 July 1948
Other legislation
Repealed by	Statute Law Revision Act 1948
Relates to	Kirkcaldy Beer Duties Act 1707

Status: Repealed

Text of statute as originally enacted

- Kirkcaldy Beer Duties Act 1741 (15 Geo. 2. c. 8)

Kirkcaldy Beer Duties Act 1757
- Act of Parliament
- Parliament of Great Britain
- Long title: An Act to continue and render more effectual an Act made in the Fifteenth Year of His present Majesty's Reign, intituled, "An Act for laying a Duty of Two Pennies Scots, or One Sixth Part of a Penny Sterling, upon every Scots Pint of Ale and Beer, which shall be brewed for Sale, brought into, tapped, or sold, within the Town of Kirkcaldy, and Liberties thereof."
- Citation: 31 Geo. 2. c. 69
- Territorial extent: Great Britain

Dates
- Royal assent: 9 June 1758
- Commencement: 1 December 1757
- Repealed: 30 July 1948
Other legislation
Amends	Kirkcaldy Beer Duties Act 1741
Amended by	Kirkcaldy Beer Duties Act 1791
Repealed by	Statute Law Revision Act 1948

Status: Repealed

Text of statute as originally enacted

- Kirkcaldy Beer Duties Act 1757 (31 Geo. 2. c. 69)

Kirkcaldy Beer Duties Act 1791
- Act of Parliament
- Parliament of Great Britain
- Long title: An Act to continue two Acts made in the Fifteenth and Thirty-first Years of the Reign of His late Majesty King George the Second, for laying a Duty of Two Pennies Scots, or One-sixth Part of a Penny Sterling, upon every Scots Pint of Ale and Beer which shall be brewed for Sale, brought into, tapped, or sold, within the Town of Kirkcaldy and Liberties thereof.
- Citation: 31 Geo. 3. c. 82
- Territorial extent: Great Britain

Dates
- Royal assent: 6 June 1791
- Commencement: 10 August 1790
- Repealed: 30 July 1948
Other legislation
Amends	Kirkcaldy Beer Duties Act 1741; Kirkcaldy Beer Duties Act 1757
Repealed by	Statute Law Revision Act 1948

Status: Repealed

Text of statute as originally enacted

- Kirkcaldy Beer Duties Act 1791 (31 Geo. 3. c. 82)
- Kirkcaldy Two Pennies Scots Act 1813 (53 Geo. 3. c. lxxxviii)

=== Linlithgow ===
In Linlithgow, acts of Parliament were passed in 1723 and 1733.

Linlithgow Beer Duties Act 1722
- Act of Parliament
- Parliament of Great Britain
- Long title: An Act for laying a Duty of Two Pennies Scots, or One Sixth Part of a Penny Sterling, upon every Scots Pint of Ale and Beer brewed and sold within the Town of Linlithgow and Liberties thereof, in the County of West Lothian, for paying the Debts of the said Town; and other Purposes therein mentioned.
- Citation: 9 Geo. 1. c. 20
- Territorial extent: Great Britain

Dates
- Royal assent: 27 May 1723
- Commencement: 1 July 1723
- Repealed: 30 July 1948
Other legislation
Amended by	Linlithgow Beer Duties Act 1732
Repealed by	Statute Law Revision Act 1948

Status: Repealed

Text of statute as originally enacted

- Linlithgow Beer Duties Act 1722 (9 Geo. 1. c. 20)

Linlithgow Beer Duties Act 1732
- Act of Parliament
- Parliament of Great Britain
- Long title: An Act for continuing a Duty of Two Pennies Scots, or One Sixth Part of a Penny Sterling, upon every Scots Pint of Ale and Beer brewed and sold within the Town of Linlithgow, and Liberties thereof, in the County of West Lothian, for paying the Debts of the said Town, and other Purposes therein mentioned.
- Citation: 6 Geo. 2. c. 18
- Territorial extent: Great Britain

Dates
- Royal assent: 17 May 1733
- Commencement: 1 July 1734
- Repealed: 30 July 1948
Other legislation
Amends	Linlithgow Beer Duties Act 1722
Repealed by	Statute Law Revision Act 1948

Status: Repealed

Text of statute as originally enacted

- Linlithgow Beer Duties Act 1732 (6 Geo. 2. c. 18)

=== Montrose ===
In Montrose, acts of Parliament were passed in 1720, 1734, 1769, 1795 and 1816.

Montrose Beer Duties Act 1719
- Act of Parliament
- Parliament of Great Britain
- Long title: An Act for laying a Duty of Two Pennies Scotts, or one Sixth Part of a Penny Sterling, upon every Pint of Ale or Beer that shall be vended or sold within the Town of Montrose and Privileges thereof, for supplying the said Town with fresh Water; and for other Purposes therein mentioned.
- Citation: 6 Geo. 1. c. 7
- Territorial extent: Great Britain

Dates
- Royal assent: 7 April 1720
- Commencement: 24 June 1720
- Repealed: 30 July 1948
Other legislation
Amended by	Montrose Beer Duties Act 1733; Montrose Beer Duties Act 1795
Repealed by	Statute Law Revision Act 1948
Relates to	Bruntisland Beer Duties Act 1719; Pittenweem Beer Duties Act 1719

Status: Repealed

Text of statute as originally enacted

- Montrose Beer Duties Act 1719 (6 Geo. 1. c. 7)

Montrose Beer Duties Act 1733
- Act of Parliament
- Parliament of Great Britain
- Long title: An Act for enlarging the Term and Powers granted by an Act passed in the Sixth Year of the Reign of His late Majesty King George the First, intituled, "An Act for laying a Duty of Two Pennies Scots, or One Sixth Part of a Penny Sterling, upon every Pint of Ale or Beer that shall be vended or sold within the Town of Montrose, and Privileges thereof, for supplying the said Town with fresh Water;" and for other Purposes therein mentioned.
- Citation: 7 Geo. 2. c. 5
- Territorial extent: Great Britain

Dates
- Royal assent: 21 March 1734
- Commencement: 17 January 1734
- Repealed: 30 July 1948
Other legislation
Amends	Montrose Beer Duties Act 1719
Amended by	Montrose Beer Duties Act 1769; Montrose Beer Duties Act 1795
Repealed by	Statute Law Revision Act 1948

Status: Repealed

Text of statute as originally enacted

- Montrose Beer Duties Act 1733 (7 Geo. 2. c. 5)

Montrose Beer Duties Act 1769
- Act of Parliament
- Parliament of Great Britain
- Long title: An Act for continuing Two Acts, made in the Sixth Year of King George the First, and in the Seventh Year of His late Majesty, for laying a Duty of Two Pennies Scots, or One Sixth Part of a Penny Sterling, upon every Pint of Ale or Beer that shall be vended or sold within the Town of Montrose and Privileges thereof, for supplying the said Town with Fresh Water; and for other Purposes therein mentioned.
- Citation: 9 Geo. 3. c. 57
- Territorial extent: Great Britain

Dates
- Royal assent: 21 March 1769
- Commencement: 8 November 1768
- Repealed: 30 July 1948
Other legislation
Amends	Montrose Beer Duties Act 1719; Montrose Beer Duties Act 1733
Amended by	Montrose Beer Duties Act 1795
Repealed by	Statute Law Revision Act 1948

Status: Repealed

Text of statute as originally enacted

- Montrose Beer Duties Act 1769 (9 Geo. 3. c. 57)

Montrose Beer Duties Act 1795
- Act of Parliament
- Parliament of Great Britain
- Long title: An Act for enlarging the Term and Powers of three several Acts made in the sixth Year of the Reign of His Majesty King George the First, in the seventh Year of the Reign of His late Majesty, and in the ninth Year of the Reign of His present Majesty, for laying a Duty of two Pennies Scots, or one sixth Part of a Penny Sterling, upon every Pint of Ale or Beer, vended or sold within the Town of Montrose and Privileges thereof, for supplying the said Town with Fresh Water; and for other Purposes therein mentioned.
- Citation: 35 Geo. 3. c. 42
- Territorial extent: Great Britain

Dates
- Royal assent: 28 April 1795
- Commencement: 30 December 1794
- Repealed: 30 July 1948
Other legislation
Amends	Montrose Beer Duties Act 1719; Montrose Beer Duties Act 1733; Montrose Beer Duties Act 1769
Amended by	Montrose Two Pennies Scots Act 1816
Repealed by	Statute Law Revision Act 1948

Status: Repealed

Text of statute as originally enacted

- Montrose Beer Duties Act 1795 (35 Geo. 3. c. 42)

Montrose Two Pennies Scots Act 1816
- Act of Parliament
- Parliament of the United Kingdom
- Long title: An Act for enlarging the Term and Powers of several Acts for laying a Duty of Two Pennies Scots, or One Sixth Part of a Penny Sterling, upon every Pint of Ale or Beer vended or sold within the Town of Montrose, and Privileges thereof; for supplying the said Town with Fresh Water; and for other Purposes therein mentioned.
- Citation: 56 Geo. 3. c. xxxvii
- Territorial extent: United Kingdom

Dates
- Royal assent: 31 May 1816
- Commencement: 1 February 1816
- Repealed: 31 January 2013
Other legislation
Amends	Montrose Beer Duties Act 1719; Montrose Beer Duties Act 1733; Montrose Beer Duties Act 1769; Montrose Beer Duties Act 1795
Repealed by	Statute Law (Repeals) Act 2013

Status: Repealed

Text of statute as originally enacted

- Montrose Two Pennies Scots Act 1816 (56 Geo. 3. c. xxxvii)

=== Paisley ===
In Paisley, an act of Parliament was passed in 1753.

Paisley Beer Duties Act 1753
- Act of Parliament
- Parliament of Great Britain
- Long title: An Act for laying a Duty of Two Pennies Scots, or One Sixth Part of a Penny Sterling, on every Scots Pint of Ale and Beer, which shall be brewed for Sale, brought into, tapped, or sold, within the Town of Paisley and Liberties thereof, in the County of Renfrew, for improving the Navigation of the River Cart; and for other Purposes.
- Citation: 26 Geo. 2. c. 96
- Territorial extent: Great Britain

Dates
- Royal assent: 7 June 1753
- Commencement: 11 January 1753
- Repealed: 30 July 1948
Other legislation
Repealed by	Statute Law Revision Act 1948

Status: Repealed

Text of statute as originally enacted

- Paisley Beer Duties Act 1753 (26 Geo. 2. c. 96)

=== Pittenweem ===
In Pittenweem, an act of Parliament was passed in 1720.

Pittenweem Beer Duties Act 1719
- Act of Parliament
- Parliament of Great Britain
- Long title: An Act for laying a Duty of Two Pennies Scotts, or one Sixth Part of a Penny Sterling, upon every Scotts Pint of Beer and Ale that shall be vended or sold within the Town of Pittenweem and Liberties thereof, for repairing the Harbour there; and for maintaining other public Works of the said Town.
- Citation: 6 Geo. 1. c. 9
- Territorial extent: Great Britain

Dates
- Royal assent: 7 April 1720
- Commencement: 24 June 1720
- Repealed: 30 July 1948
Other legislation
Repealed by	Statute Law Revision Act 1948
Relates to	Montrose Beer Duties Act 1719; Bruntisland Beer Duties Act 1719

Status: Repealed

Text of statute as originally enacted

- Pittenweem Beer Duties Act 1719 (6 Geo. 1. c. 9)

=== Port Glasgow ===
In Port Glasgow, an act of Parliament was passed in 1799.

Port Glasgow and Newark Two Pennies Scots Act 1799
- Act of Parliament
- Parliament of Great Britain
- Long title: An act for continuing for thirty-eight years, and rendering more effectual several acts for charging a duty of two pennies Scots (or one sixth part of a penny sterling) on every pint of ale and beer vended or sold within the towns of Port Glasgow and Newark, and privileges thereof.
- Citation: 39 Geo. 3. c. xxxix
- Territorial extent: Great Britain

Dates
- Royal assent: 13 June 1799
- Commencement: 13 June 1799
- Repealed: 31 January 2013
Other legislation
Repealed by	Statute Law (Repeals) Act 2013

Status: Repealed

- Port Glasgow and Newark Two Pennies Scots Act 1799 (39 Geo. 3. c. xxxix)

=== Prestonpans ===
In Prestonpans, acts of Parliament were passed in 1753 and 1758.

Prestonpans Beer Duties Act 1753
- Act of Parliament
- Parliament of Great Britain
- Long title: An Act for laying a Duty of Two Pennies Scots, or a Sixth Part of a Penny Sterling, upon every Scots Pint of Ale and Beer, which shall be brewed for Sale, brought into, tapped, or sold, within the Town and Parish of Preston Pans, in the Shire of East Lothian, otherwise Haddingtoun, for repairing the Harbour of the said Town; and for other Purposes therein mentioned.
- Citation: 26 Geo. 2. c. 79
- Territorial extent: Great Britain

Dates
- Royal assent: 15 May 1753
- Commencement: 11 January 1753
- Repealed: 30 July
Other legislation
Amended by	Prestonpans Beer Duties Act 1757
Repealed by	Statute Law Revision Act 1948

Status: Repealed

Text of statute as originally enacted

- Prestonpans Beer Duties Act 1753 (26 Geo. 2. c. 79)

Prestonpans Beer Duties Act 1757
- Act of Parliament
- Parliament of Great Britain
- Long title: An Act for enlarging the Term granted by an Act made in the Twenty-sixth Year of His present Majesty's Reign, intituled, "An Act for laying a Duty of Two Pennies Scots, or a Sixth Part of a Penny Sterling, upon every Scots Pint of Ale and Beer, which shall be brewed for Sale, brought into, tapped, or sold, within the Town and Parish of Preston Pans, in the Shire of East Lothian, otherwise Haddingtoun, for repairing the Harbour of the said Town; and for other Purposes therein mentioned."
- Citation: 31 Geo. 2. c. 52
- Territorial extent: Great Britain

Dates
- Royal assent: 13 April 1758
- Commencement: 1 December 1757
- Repealed: 30 July 1948
Other legislation
Amends	Prestonpans Beer Duties Act 1753
Repealed by	Statute Law Revision Act 1948

Status: Repealed

Text of statute as originally enacted

- Prestonpans Beer Duties Act 1757 (31 Geo. 2. c. 52)
