= List of acts of the Parliament of Scotland from 1705 =

This is a list of acts of the Parliament of Scotland for the year 1705.

It lists acts of Parliament of the old Parliament of Scotland, that was merged with the old Parliament of England to form the Parliament of Great Britain, by the Union with England Act 1707 (c. 7).

For other years, see list of acts of the Parliament of Scotland. For the period after 1707, see list of acts of the Parliament of Great Britain.

== 1705 ==
The 3rd session of the parliament of Anne, held in Edinburgh from June 28 1705 until 21 September 1705.

Short title, or popular name	Citation	Royal assent
Long title
Not public and general	1705 c. 1 (Note: This is the citation in the Record Edition.) — (Note: This act is not listed in the Duodecimal Edition.)	14 September 1705
Ratification in favors of Her Majesties high Commissioner, John Duke of Argyll of the Dukedom of Argyll, &c.
Not public and general	1705 c. 2 —	14 September 1705
Ratification in favors of John Earl and Margaret Countess of Mar of a tack of the duties of the Lands and Lordship of Stirling.
Not public and general	1705 c. 3 —	14 September 1705
Ratification in favors of Lord Charles Ker Director of the Chancellary.
Not public and general	1705 c. 4 —	14 September 1705
Ratification of a Chartor under the Great Seal in favors of the deceased Mr William Hamilton son to umquhill Lord Basil Hamilton of the Baronies of Baldoon Cumpstoun and Lochfergus.
Not public and general	1705 c. 5 —	14 September 1705
Ratification in favors of Sir William Anstruther of that Ilk of the Barony of Anstruther.
Not public and general	1705 c. 6 —	14 September 1705
Ratification in favors of Mr Robert Stewart of Tillicultry of the Lands and Barony of Tillicultry, &c.
Not public and general	1705 c. 7 —	14 September 1705
Ratification in favors of Daniel Steuart brother german to Sir William Steuart of Castlemilk..
Not public and general	1705 c. 8 —	14 September 1705
Ratification in favors of Sir Gilbert Elliot of Minto and Gilbert Elliot his son of the Lands and Barony of Minto.
Not public and general	1705 c. 9 —	14 September 1705
Ratification in favors of Sir Gilbert Elliot of Minto and Gilbert Elliot his son of the Barony of Headshaw.
Not public and general	1705 c. 10 —	14 September 1705
Ratification in favors of David Earl of Leven of a tack of the feu and teind duties of lands within the parishes Dumfermling Kinglassie and Newburn.
Not public and general	1705 c. 11 —	14 September 1705
Ratification in favors of Lieutenent Collonel William Maxwell of the Lands and Barony of Cardiness.
Not public and general	1705 c. 12 —	14 September 1705
Ratification in favors of Arthur Forbes of Echt of the Barony of Echt.
Not public and general	1705 c. 13 —	14 September 1705
Ratification in favors of John Leith of Leithhall and John Leith his son of the Lands and Barony of Leithhall.
Not public and general	1705 c. 14 —	14 September 1705
Ratification and Act in favors of John Forbes of Balflug and George Forbes his son of the Barony of Alfoord.
Not public and general	1705 c. 15 —	14 September 1705
Ratification in favors of James Earl of Mortoun of the Gift of an Annuity out of the Earldom and Lordships of Orkney and Zetland.
Not public and general	1705 c. 16 —	14 September 1705
Ratification in favors of James Earl of Mortoun of the Earldom of Mortoun.
Not public and general	1705 c. 17 —	14 September 1705
Ratification in favors of Sir William Maxwell of Monreith of the Lands and Barony of Monreith Aplebie, &c.
Not public and general	1705 c. 18 —	14 September 1705
Ratification in favors of Sir Alexander Ogilvie of Forglen of the Toun and Lands of Todlaw.
Not public and general	1705 c. 19 —	14 September 1705
Ratification in favors of Mr James Nasmith of Dawick of the Lands and Barony of Dawick.Ratification in favors of Mr James Na smith of Dawick of the Lands and Ba rony of Dawick.
Not public and general	1705 c. 20 —	14 September 1705
Act in favors of George Duke of Gordon for two yearly fairs at the toun of Huntley.
Not public and general	1705 c. 21 —	14 September 1705
Act in favors of Charles Earl of Erroll for two yearly fairs at the toun of Turrif.
Not public and general	1705 c. 22 —	14 September 1705
Act in favors of John Earl of Wigtoun for a weekly mercat and four yearly fairs at the Kirk of Denny and two yearly fairs at the Newtoun of Cumbernald.
Not public and general	1705 c. 23 —	14 September 1705
Act in favors of Sir John Johnstoun of Caskiebend for three yearly fairs at the hill of Tyrebagger.
Not public and general	1705 c. 24 —	14 September 1705
Act in favors of Sir Robert Dickson of Inueresk for a weekly mercat and two yearly fairs at the toun of Inveresk.
Not public and general	1705 c. 25 —	14 September 1705
Act in favors of Sir Alexander Anstruther of Newwark for a weekly mercat and two yearly fairs within the burgh of barony of Saint Mineans and Newwark.
Not public and general	1705 c. 26 —	14 September 1705
Act in favors of John Napier of Culcreoch for a weekly mercat and two yearly fairs at the Clachan of Fintry.
Not public and general	1705 c. 27 —	14 September 1705
Act changeing a weekly mercat & two yearly fairs in favors of the Burgh of Anstruther Wester.
Not public and general	1705 c. 28 —	14 September 1705
Act in favors of the Marquess of Tweeddale & the Countess and heirs and Donators of Dumfermling for a weekly mercat and two yearly fairs at the kirktoun of Fyvie.
Not public and general	1705 c. 29 —	14 September 1705
Act in favors of Robert Craig of Riccartoun for a weekly mercat and two yearly fairs at the Toun of Currie.
Not public and general	1705 c. 30 —	14 September 1705
Act for two yearly fairs in favors of the Burgh of Stirling.
Not public and general	1705 c. 31 —	14 September 1705
Act in favors of Robert Lord Rollo for a yearly fair at the toun of Doning.
Not public and general	1705 c. 32 —	14 September 1705
Act in favors of John Drummond of Pitkellony for three yearly fairs and a weekly mercat at the kirktoun of Muthill.
Not public and general	1705 c. 33 —	14 September 1705
Act in favors of Alexander Forbes of Ludquhairn for a weekly mercat at the Toun of Ludquhairn.
Not public and general	1705 c. 34 —	14 September 1705
Act changeing a weekly mercat at the Toun of Kincardine Oneill in favors of Sir Robert Forbes Advocat.
Not public and general	1705 c. 35 —	14 September 1705
Act in favors of John Murray of Touchaddam for two yearly fairs upon the lands and barony of Balquidrock.
Not public and general	1705 c. 36 —	14 September 1705
Act in favors of John Earl of Stair for two yearly fairs at the Burgh of Barony of Glenluce.
Not public and general	1705 c. 37 —	14 September 1705
Act in favors of Sir Alexander Menzies of that Ilk for three yearly fairs at the Kirktoun of Weem and Toun of Dull.
Not public and general	1705 c. 38 —	14 September 1705
Act in favors of Sir Alexander Murray of Melgum for two yearly fairs at the Crosstoun of Aberlemno.
Not public and general	1705 c. 39 —	14 September 1705
Act in favors of Mrs Grissell Kinninmonth of that Ilk and Sir Alexr Murray of Melgum her husband for two yearly fairs at the toun of Lochgellie.
Not public and general	1705 c. 40 —	14 September 1705
Act in favors of Patrick Campbell of Monzie, for two yearly fairs and a weekly mercat upon the common green of Monzie.
Not public and general	1705 c. 41 —	14 September 1705
Act in favors of Sir James Campbell of Auchinbreck for four yearly fairs and a weekly mercat at the toun of Kilmichael in Glassrie.
Not public and general	1705 c. 42 —	14 September 1705
Act in favors of Archbald Mackalester of Tarbet for four yearly fairs and a weekly mercat at the Toun of East Tarbet.
Not public and general	1705 c. 43 —	14 September 1705
Act in favors of Alexander Livingston of Badlormie for a weekly mercat and four yearly fairs at the East Craigs of Ogilface.
Not public and general	1705 c. 44 —	14 September 1705
Act in favors of Sir Samuel Forbes of Foveran for two yearly fairs upon the lands of Swanfoord.
Not public and general	1705 c. 45 —	14 September 1705
Act in favors of James Broddie of that Ilk for two yearly fairs and a weekly mercat at the toun of Dycke.
Not public and general	1705 c. 46 —	18 September 1705
Ratification in favors of Robert Bisset Lessindrum and Alexander Bisset his son of the Barony of Lessindrum.
Butter and Cheese Act 1705 (repealed)	1705 c. 47; 1705 c. 1 (Note: This is the citation in the Duodecimal Edition.)	21 September 1705
Act Discharging the Importation of English Irish and Foreign Butter and Cheese. (Repealed by Statute Law Revision (Scotland) Act 1906 (6 Edw. 7. c. 38))
Fisheries Act 1705 still in force	1705 c. 48; 1705 c. 2	21 September 1705
Act for advancing and establishing the Fishing Trade in and about this Kingdom.
Council of Trade Act 1705 (repealed)	1705 c. 49; 1705 c. 3	21 September 1705
Act appointing a Council of Trade. (Repealed by Statute Law Revision (Scotland) Act 1906 (6 Edw. 7. c. 38))
Act for a Treaty with England 1705 (repealed)	1705 c. 50; 1705 c. 4	21 September 1705
Act for a Treaty with England. (Repealed by Statute Law Revision (Scotland) Act 1906 (6 Edw. 7. c. 38))
Beef and Pork Act 1705 (repealed)	1705 c. 51; 1705 c. 5	21 September 1705
Act for inconraging the Exportation of Beef and Pork. (Repealed by Statute Law Revision (Scotland) Act 1906 (6 Edw. 7. c. 38))
Linen and Wool Act 1705 (repealed)	1705 c. 52; 1705 c. 6	21 September 1705
Act Declaring Linnen and Woollen Manufacture free of duty at Exportation. (Repealed by Statute Law Revision (Scotland) Act 1906 (6 Edw. 7. c. 38))
Supply Act 1705 (repealed)	1705 c. 53; 1705 c. 7	21 September 1705
Act for a Supply of Seven Months Cess out of the Land Rent. (Repealed by Statute Law Revision (Scotland) Act 1906 (6 Edw. 7. c. 38))
Glasgow Beer Duties Act 1705 Not public and general	1705 c. 54 —	21 September 1705
Act in favors of the Toun of Glasgow for an Imposition of two pennies on the pint of ale and beer.
Not public and general	1705 c. 55; 1705 c. 8	21 September 1705
Act in favors of Mistress Jean Ramsay.
Saving the Rights Act 1705 Not public and general	1705 c. 56; 1705 c. 9	21 September 1705
Act Salvo Jure Cujuslibet.
Adjournment Act 1705 (repealed)	Vol. XI, p. 299; 1705 c. 10	21 September 1705
Act of Adjournment. (Repealed by Statute Law Revision (Scotland) Act 1906 (6 Edw. 7. c. 38))

=== Sources ===
- Alexander, William (1841). "Acta Parliamentorum Annæ". An Abridgement of the Acts of the Parliaments of Scotland. Edinburgh: Adam and Charles Black. pp. 522–523 – via Google Books.
- Alexander, William (1841). "Acta Parliamentorum Annæ". An Abridgement of the Acts of the Parliaments of Scotland. Edinburgh: Adam and Charles Black. pp. 522–523 – via Google Books.
- Chronological Table of the Statutes. London: Her Majesty's Stationery Office. 1972. p. 1368 – via Google Books.
- "Acts of the Old Scottish Parliament: 1705". legislation.gov.uk. The National Archives.
- "Index of Statutes: Anne (1702-1707)". Records of the Parliaments of Scotland to 1707. University of St Andrews.

== See also ==
- List of legislation in the United Kingdom
- Records of the Parliaments of Scotland
