= List of acts of the Parliament of Scotland from 1695 =

This is a list of acts of the Parliament of Scotland for the year 1695.

It lists acts of Parliament of the old Parliament of Scotland, that was merged with the old Parliament of England to form the Parliament of Great Britain, by the Union with England Act 1707 (c. 7).

For other years, see list of acts of the Parliament of Scotland. For the period after 1707, see list of acts of the Parliament of Great Britain.

== 1695 ==
The 5th session of the parliament of William II, held in Edinburgh from 9 May 1695.

Short title, or popular name	Citation	Royal assent
Long title
Fast Act 1695 (repealed)	1695 c. 1 (Note: This is the citation in the Record Edition.); 1695 c. 1 (Note: This is the citation in the Duodecimal Edition.)	16 May 1695
Act for a Solemn Fast. Act for a Solemn Fast. (Repealed by Statute Law Revision (Scotland) Act 1906 (6 Edw. 7. c. 38))
Not public and general	1695 c. 2 — (Note: This act is not listed in the Duodecimal Edition.)	16 May 1695
Act in favors of Evan McGrigor Merchant in Edinburgh.
Not public and general	1695 c. 3 —	27 May 1695
Decreet in favours of Sir William Scot of Harden against George M Kenzie of Rosehaugh.
Citations Before Parliament Act 1695 (repealed)	1695 c. 4; 1695 c. 2	28 May 1695
Act Regulating Citations before the Parliament. Act Regulating Citations before the Parliament. (Repealed by Statute Law Revision (Scotland) Act 1906 (6 Edw. 7. c. 38))
Adjournment of Session Act 1695 (repealed)	1695 c. 5; 1695 c. 3	31 May 1695
Act Adjourning the Summer Session the first of July. Act Adjourning the Summer Session until the first of July. (Repealed by Statute Law Revision (Scotland) Act 1906 (6 Edw. 7. c. 38))
Justice Court Act 1695 (repealed)	1695 c. 6; 1695 c. 4	
Act anent the Justice Court. Act about the Justice Court. (Repealed by Statute Law Revision (Scotland) Act 1964 (c. 80))
Cautioners Act 1695 (repealed)	1695 c. 7; 1695 c. 5	7 June 1695
Act anent Principals and Cautioners. (Repealed by Prescription and Limitation (Scotland) Act 1973 (c. 52))
Judicial Sale Act 1695 (repealed)	1695 c. 8; 1695 c. 6	18 June 1695
Act Regulating the Sale and Payment of Bankrupts Estates. Act Regulating the Sale and Payment of Bankrupts Estates. (Repealed by Statute Law (Repeals) Act 1973 (c. 39))
Supply Act 1695 (repealed)	1695 c. 9; 1695 c. 7	20 June 1695
Act for Six Moneths Supply upon the Land Rent. Act for Six Months Supply upon the Land Rent. (Repealed by Statute Law Revision (Scotland) Act 1906 (6 Edw. 7. c. 38))
Company of Scotland Act 1695 (repealed)	1695 c. 10; 1695 c. 8	26 June 1695
Act for a Company Tradeing to Affrica and the Indies. Act for a Company Trading to Africa and the Indies. (Repealed by Statute Law Revision (Scotland) Act 1906 (6 Edw. 7. c. 38))
Adjournment of Session (No. 2) Act 1695 (repealed)	1695 c. 11; 1695 c. 9	27 June 1695
Act adjourning the Session till the first day of November 1695. Act adjourning the Session until the first day of November 1695. (Repealed by Statute Law Revision (Scotland) Act 1906 (6 Edw. 7. c. 38))
Supply (No. 2) Act 1695 (repealed)	1695 c. 12; 1695 c. 10	27 June 1695
Act for Pole Money. Act for Poll Money. (Repealed by Statute Law Revision (Scotland) Act 1906 (6 Edw. 7. c. 38))
Not public and general	1695 c. 13 —	27 June 1695
Act in favours of Sir James Ramsay of Logie and his Lady against the Earl & Countess of Seaforth.
Blasphemy Act 1695 (repealed)	1695 c. 14; 1695 c. 11	28 June 1695
Act against Blasphemy. Act against Blasphemy. (Repealed by Doctrine of the Trinity Act 1813 (53 Geo. 3. c. 160))
Baptisms and Marriages Act 1695 (repealed)	1695 c. 15; 1695 c. 12	28 June 1695
Act against irregular Baptisms and Marriages. Act against irregular Baptisms and Marriages. (Repealed by Scottish Episcopalians Act 1711 (10 Ann. c. 10))
Profaneness Act 1695 (repealed)	1695 c. 16; 1695 c. 13	28 June 1695
Act against Prophaneness. Act against Profaneness. (Repealed by Statute Law Revision (Scotland) Act 1906 (6 Edw. 7. c. 38))
Markets on Sundays Act 1695 (repealed)	1695 c. 17; 1695 c. 14	28 June 1695
Act for Restraining the Profanation of the Lords day by keeping Weekly Mercats on Monday & Saturday. Act for Restraining the Disrespect of the Lord's Day by keeping Weekly Markets on Mondays and Saturdays. (Repealed by Statute Law Revision (Scotland) Act 1906 (6 Edw. 7. c. 38))
Not public and general	1695 c. 18 —	1 July 1695
Act of Deprivation against M^{r} Thomas Crevy, M^{r} Andrew Burnet & M^{r} Alex^{r} Thomson, Ministers.
Not public and general	1695 c. 19 —	1 July 1695
Decreet in favours of the Earles of Roxburgh Galloway Haddingtoun and Kelly against the Earle of Lothian.
Not public and general	1695 c. 20 —	1 July 1695
Decreet in favours of M^{r} Thomas Skeen Advocat for proving the Tenor of some lost writs.
Not public and general	1695 c. 21 —	1 July 1695
Act in favours of the Kings Colledge of Old Aberdeen.
Not public and general	1695 c. 22 —	1 July 1695
Decreet in favours of the coheirs of Sir Thomas Niccolson of Carnock against Sir Thomas Niccolson of Tillicoultry.
Not public and general	1695 c. 23 —	5 July 1695
Act Discharging & Asoilzeing Gilbert Meinzies of Pitfoddells from the process of Treason against him Remitted to the Justice Court.
Not public and general	1695 c. 24 —	5 July 1695
Act of Liberation in favors of Mr Andrew Burnet Mr Thomas Creavie and Mr Alexander Thomson Ministers.
Not public and general	1695 c. 25 —	5 July 1695
Act and Remit to the Session the Cause at the Town of Edinburghs instance against Æneas McLeod their Clerk.
Vacant Churches Act 1695 (repealed)	1695 c. 26; 1695 c. 15	5 July 1695
Act for Encouragement of Preachers at Vacant Churches benorth Forth. (Repealed by Church Patronage (Scotland) Act 1711 (10 Ann. c. 21))
Persons Restored from Forfeiture Act 1695 (repealed)	1695 c. 27; 1695 c. 16	5 July 1695
Act anent the ease of annual rents due by Persons restored and anent the Creditors diligence to be used against them. (Repealed by Statute Law Revision (Scotland) Act 1906 (6 Edw. 7. c. 38))
Mint Act 1695 (repealed)	1695 c. 28; 1695 c. 17	5 July 1695
Act anent the Mint. Act regarding the Mint. (Repealed by Statute Law Revision (Scotland) Act 1906 (6 Edw. 7. c. 38))
Teind Commission Act 1695 (repealed)	1695 c. 29; 1695 c. 18	5 July 1695
Act anent the Quorum of the Commission for Plantation of Kirks and Valuation of Teinds. (Repealed by Statute Law Revision (Scotland) Act 1906 (6 Edw. 7. c. 38))
Muslin Act 1695 (repealed)	1695 c. 30; 1695 c. 19	5 July 1695
Act anent the Duty on Scots Muslin. (Repealed by Linen and Wool Act 1705 (c. 52))
Post Office Act 1695 (repealed)	1695 c. 31; 1695 c. 20	5 July 1695
Act anent the Post Office. Act regarding the Post Office. (Repealed by Post Office (Revenues) Act 1710 (9 Ann. c. 11))
Brandy Act 1695 (repealed)	1695 c. 32; 1695 c. 21	5 July 1695
Explanatory Act anent the Excise of Brandy. (Repealed by Statute Law Revision (Scotland) Act 1906 (6 Edw. 7. c. 38))
Not public and general	1695 c. 33 —	5 July 1695
Act in favors of James Lyell of Gairden for Erecting of Manufactories of Oyle and of Rabbet and Hair skins.
Not public and general	1695 c. 34 —	5 July 1695
Act in favors of Sir Alexander Hope of Kerse & his Copartners for Erecting a Manufactory of Gun Powder and Allom.
Intrusion into Churches Act 1695 (repealed)	1695 c. 35; 1695 c. 22	5 July 1695
Act against Intruding into Churches without a Legal Call and Admission thereto. (Repealed by Statute Law Revision (Scotland) Act 1964 (c. 80))
Runrig Lands Act 1695 still in force	1695 c. 36; 1695 c. 23	5 July 1695
Act anent Lands lying Run-rig.
Not public and general	1695 c. 37 —	9 July 1695
Act against Intruding into Churches with out a Legal Call and Admission thereto.
Not public and general	1695 c. 38 —	9 July 1695
Act for a General Collection in favours of the Burgh of Cullen.
Apparent Heirs Act 1695 (repealed)	1695 c. 39; 1695 c. 24	10 July 1695
Act for Obviating the fraud of Appearand Heirs. (Repealed by Statute Law Revision (Scotland) Act 1906 (6 Edw. 7. c. 38))
Fines Act 1695 (repealed)	1695 c. 40; 1695 c. 25	10 July 1695
Act anent the Repetition of Fines. (Repealed by Statute Law Revision (Scotland) Act 1906 (6 Edw. 7. c. 38))
Not public and general	1695 c. 41 —	10 July 1695
Act for a Manufactory of White Paper.
Succession to Papists Act 1695 (repealed)	1695 c. 42; 1695 c. 26	11 July 1695
Act discharging Popish Persons to prejudge their Protestant Heirs in Succession. (Repealed by Statute Law Revision (Scotland) Act 1906 (6 Edw. 7. c. 38))
Not public and general	1695 c. 43 —	11 July 1695
Act in favours of the Linen Manufactory.
Not public and general	1695 c. 44 —	11 July 1695
Act and Remit in favours of Sir John Gordon of Park & John Gordon of Rothemay against John Abernethy of Meyen & others.
Not public and general	1695 c. 45 —	12 July 1695
Act in favours of Charles Lord Fraser.
Not public and general	1695 c. 46 —	12 July 1695
Decreet in favours of Sir John Dempster of Pitliver against Kenneth Earl of Seaforth and Isobell Countess Douager of Seaforth his Mother.
Not public and general	1695 c. 47 —	12 July 1695
Act and Remit in favours of Margaret Lady Dowager of Belhaven.
Not public and general	1695 c. 48 —	12 July 1695
Act and Remit in favours of the Synod of Argyle.
Not public and general	1695 c. 49 —	12 July 1695
Act and Remit in favours of the late Bishop of the Isles.
Not public and general	1695 c. 50 —	15 July 1695
Act Expelling John Dick Commissioner for the Burgh of Stirling from being a Member of Parliament and Warrant granted for Electing one in his place.
Church Act 1695 (repealed)	1695 c. 51; 1695 c. 27	16 July 1695
Act concerning the Church. (Repealed by Statute Law Revision (Scotland) Act 1964 (c. 80))
Excise Act 1695 (repealed)	1695 c. 52; 1695 c. 28	16 July 1695
Act for continuing the Additional Excise till March 1697 with three Moneths farther Cess. (Repealed by Statute Law Revision (Scotland) Act 1906 (6 Edw. 7. c. 38))
Excise (No. 2) Act 1695 (repealed)	1695 c. 53; 1695 c. 29	16 July 1695
Act for the Additional and Annexed Excises. (Repealed by Statute Law Revision (Scotland) Act 1906 (6 Edw. 7. c. 38))
Soil Preservation Act 1695 (repealed)	1695 c. 54; 1695 c. 30	16 July 1695
Act for Preservation of Meadowes Lands and Pasturages lying adjacent to sand hills. (Repealed by Statute Law (Repeals) Act 1974 (c. 22))
Supply (No. 3) Act 1695 (repealed)	1695 c. 55; 1695 c. 31	16 July 1695
Act for Turning the Tack of the Pole 1693 into a Collection. (Repealed by Statute Law Revision (Scotland) Act 1906 (6 Edw. 7. c. 38))
Not public and general	1695 c. 56 —	16 July 1695
Act in favours of Charles Hope of Hopetoun.
Statute Law Revision Act 1695 (repealed)	1695 c. 57 —	16 July 1695
Act and Commission for Reviseing the Lawes and Practiques of this Kingdom. (Repealed by Statute Law Revision (Scotland) Act 1906 (6 Edw. 7. c. 38))
Not public and general	1695 c. 58 —	16 July 1695
Act in favours of Sir James Stuart His Majesties Advocat.
Ayr Malt Duties Act 1695 Not public and general	1695 c. 59 —	16 July 1695
Act in favours of the Burgh of Air for an Imposition on Malt to repair their harbour.
Aberdeen Beer Duties Act 1695 Not public and general	1695 c. 60 —	16 July 1695
Act in favours of the Burgh of Aberdeen for an Imposition on Ale &c. for repairing their harbour.
Not public and general	1695 c. 61 —	16 July 1695
Act in favours of the Toun of Irwin for an Imposition to repair their harbour & bridge.
Not public and general	1695 c. 62 —	16 July 1695
Act in favours of Duncan Forbes of Culloden anent the Excise of Ferrintosh.
Exportation of Victual Act 1695 (repealed)	1695 c. 63; 1695 c. 32	17 July 1695
Act for Encouraging the Exportation of Victual. Act for Encouraging the Exportation of Victual. (Repealed by Statute Law Revision (Scotland) Act 1906 (6 Edw. 7. c. 38))
Defence of the Realm Act 1695 (repealed)	1695 c. 64; 1695 c. 33	17 July 1695
Act for the Levies. Act for the Levies. (Repealed by Statute Law Revision (Scotland) Act 1906 (6 Edw. 7. c. 38))
Import Duties Act 1695 (repealed)	1695 c. 65; 1695 c. 34	17 July 1695
Act for Additional Imposition upon Forraign Commodities imported. Act for Additional Imposition upon imported Foreign Commodities. (Repealed by Statute Law Revision (Scotland) Act 1906 (6 Edw. 7. c. 38))
Linen Act 1695 (repealed)	1695 c. 66; 1695 c. 35	17 July 1695
Act anent Burying in Scots Linen. Act regarding Burial in Scottish Linen. (Repealed by Statute Law Revision (Scotland) Act 1906 (6 Edw. 7. c. 38))
Skinners Act 1695 (repealed)	1695 c. 67; 1695 c. 36	17 July 1695
Act anent the Skinners. Act regarding the Skinners. (Repealed by Statute Law Revision (Scotland) Act 1906 (6 Edw. 7. c. 38))
Justiciary Act 1695 (repealed)	1695 c. 68; 1695 c. 37	17 July 1695
Act anent the Justiciary of the Highlands. Act regarding the Justiciary of the Highlands. (Repealed by Statute Law Revision (Scotland) Act 1906 (6 Edw. 7. c. 38))
Division of Commonties Act 1695 still in force	1695 c. 69; 1695 c. 38	17 July 1695
Act concerning the Dividing of Commonties. Act concerning the Dividing of Commonties.
Rum Act 1695 (repealed)	1695 c. 70; 1695 c. 39	17 July 1695
Act Discharging the venting of Rum. Act Discharging the vending of Rum. (Repealed by Rum Act 1696 (c. 7))
Signet Letters Act 1695 (repealed)	1695 c. 71; 1695 c. 40	17 July 1695
Act anent Letters passing the Signet. Act regardind Letters passing the Signet. (Repealed by Statute Law Revision (Scotland) Act 1964 (c. 80))
Confirmation Act 1695 still in force	1695 c. 72; 1695 c. 41	17 July 1695
Act anent Executry and Moveables. Act regarding Executry in Moveables.
Common Good Act 1695 (repealed)	1695 c. 73; 1695 c. 42	17 July 1695
Act allowing the Administrators of the Common good of Burrowes to Adventure their Stocks or any part thereof in the Company of Forraign Trade. Act allowing the Administrators of the Common good of Burghs to Adventure their Stocks, or any part thereof, in the Company of Foreign Trade. (Repealed by Statute Law Revision (Scotland) Act 1906 (6 Edw. 7. c. 38))
Poor Act 1695 (repealed)	1695 c. 74; 1695 c. 43	17 July 1695
Act for Reviving the Acts of Councill anent the Poor. Act for Reviving the Acts of Council regarding the Poor. (Repealed by Statute Law Revision (Scotland) Act 1906 (6 Edw. 7. c. 38))
Not public and general	1695 c. 75 —	17 July 1695
Act in favours of the Earle of Marishalls Colledge of Aberdeen. Act in favour of the Earl of Marischal's College of Aberdeen.
Not public and general	1695 c. 76 —	17 July 1695
Act and Remit to the Session in favours of Alexander Strauchan of Glenkindie. Act and remit to the session in favour of Alexander Strachan of Glenkindie.
Not public and general	1695 c. 77 —	17 July 1695
Act in favours of George Baillie of Jerviswood anent his house at the head of Craigscloss. Act in favour of George Baillie of Jerviswood regarding his house at the head of Craigs Close.
Not public and general	1695 c. 78 —	17 July 1695
Act and Protection in favours of Sir Archibald Cockburn of Langtoun.
Not public and general	1695 c. 79 —	17 July 1695
Act in favours of William Beatie for certain vacant Stipends for building a bridge upon the water of Bervie.
Not public and general	1695 c. 80 —	17 July 1695
Decreet in favours of Mrs Lillias Stuart against Christian Pringle & others for Proving the Tenor of some burnt Writs.
Not public and general	1695 c. 81 —	17 July 1695
Act in favours of John Holmes Thomas Leishman and William Parke Combemakers.
Not public and general	1695 c. 82 —	17 July 1695
Act in favours of Alexander Fearn Engraver in Edinburgh.
Not public and general	1695 c. 83 —	17 July 1695
Act in favours of William Scot & his partners for Erecting ane Saw Miln at Leith.
Not public and general	1695 c. 84 —	17 July 1695
Act in favours of Robert Douglas anent the Manufactories of Soap Sugar & Starch at Leith.
Not public and general	1695 c. 85 —	17 July 1695
Act in favours of John Adair Geographer and Captain John Slezer.
Not public and general	1695 c. 86 —	17 July 1695
Act in favours of Whitefield Hayter Citizen in London & his Partners for a Leather Manufactory.
Not public and general	1695 c. 87 —	17 July 1695
Act in favours of Daniel Carmichael and the heirs of tailzie of Mauldslie.
Bank of Scotland Act 1695 Not public and general	1695 c. 88 —	17 July 1695
Act for Erecting a Publick Bank. (Note: Also given as Act for erecting a Bank in Scotland.); Act for Erecting a Public Bank.
Dysart Beer Duties Act 1695 Not public and general	1695 c. 89 —	17 July 1695
Act in favours of the Burgh of Dysart for ane Imposition on Ale & Beer.
Not public and general	1695 c. 90 —	17 July 1695
Act in favours of the Burgh of Culross for ane Imposition on Malt and Ale.
Not public and general	1695 c. 91 —	17 July 1695
Act in favours of the Dutchess of Hamilton for three yearly fairs within the Isle of Arran.
Not public and general	1695 c. 92 —	17 July 1695
Act in favours of William Gordon for four fairs yearly at the Rawes of Huntly.
Not public and general	1695 c. 93 —	17 July 1695
Act in favours of the Earle of Glencairn for two yearly fairs at the toun of Kilmahome.
Airdrie Fairs and Market Act 1695 Not public and general	1695 c. 94 —	17 July 1695
Act in favours of Robert Hamilton of Airdry for four yearly fairs & a weekly Mercat at the toun of Airdry.
Not public and general	1695 c. 95 —	17 July 1695
Act in favors of Archibald Naper of Balquhaple for four yearly fairs & a weekly Mercat at the toun of Kings Balquhaple.
Not public and general	1695 c. 96 —	17 July 1695
Act in favours of John Buchanan of Leny for four yearly fairs & a weekly Mercat at the toun of Cults of Leny.
Not public and general	1695 c. 97 —	17 July 1695
Act in favours of the Burgh of Brechin for a yearly fair upon Trinity mure.
Not public and general	1695 c. 98 —	17 July 1695
Act in favors of John Watson of Duniekeir for three yearly fairs at Pathhead.
Not public and general	1695 c. 99 —	17 July 1695
Act in favours of Thomas Forbes of Watertoun for four yearly fairs at the Toun of Ellon.
Not public and general	1695 c. 100 —	17 July 1695
Act in favors of George Lockhart of Carnwath for two yearly fairs at the toun of Carnwath.
Not public and general	1695 c. 101 —	17 July 1695
Act in favors of the Burgh of North Berwick for two yearly fairs & a weekly Mercat there.
Not public and general	1695 c. 102 —	17 July 1695
Act in favours of Cochran of Kilmarnock for four yearly fairs upon the Smiddie hill of Gorgannie.
Not public and general	1695 c. 103 —	17 July 1695
Act in favours of Cumming of Altar for two yearly fairs at the toun of Licklawall.
Not public and general	1695 c. 104 —	17 July 1695
Act in favours of the Burgh of Lauder for changeing the weekly Mercat.
Not public and general	1695 c. 105 —	17 July 1695
Act in favors of James Earle of Galloway for two yearly fairs and a weekly Mercat at St Johns Clachan.
Not public and general	1695 c. 106 —	17 July 1695
Act in favors of the Burgh of Dysart for three yearly fairs.
Not public and general	1695 c. 107 —	17 July 1695
Act in favours of Campbell of Inuerliver for two yearly fairs at Anacra.
Not public and general	1695 c. 108 —	17 July 1695
Act in favors of Sir James Gordon of Lessmore for three yearly Mercats at the park of Shiack.
Not public and general	1695 c. 109 —	17 July 1695
Act in favours of the Burgh of Inverkeithing for ane free fair yearly.
Not public and general	1695 c. 110 —	17 July 1695
Act in favours of the Burgh of Dingwall for ane yearly fair & weekly mercat.
Not public and general	1695 c. 111 —	17 July 1695
Act in favours of Thomas Earl of Haddingtoun for ane yearly fair at the Toun of Melross.
Not public and general	1695 c. 112 —	17 July 1695
Act in favors of David Boyle of Kelburn for two yearly fairs & a weekly mercat at the kirk of Dalry.
Not public and general	1695 c. 113 —	17 July 1695
Act in favours of the Laird of Luss for four yearly fairs & a weekly mercat.
Not public and general	1695 c. 114 —	17 July 1695
Act in favours of the Toun of Dumbartan for two yearly fairs.
Not public and general	1695 c. 115 —	17 July 1695
Act in favours of Sr Thomas Stuart of Kirkfield for two yearly fairs & two weekly Mercats at the toun of Overtoun of Cambusnetham. Act in favour of Sir Thomas Stuart of Kirkfield for two yearly fairs and two weekly markets at the town of Overtown of Cambusnethan.
Not public and general	1695 c. 116 —	17 July 1695
Act in favours of Mr Robert Keith of Fedderat for three yearly fairs and a weekly Mercat at the toun of Fedderat. Act in favour of Mr Robert Keith of Federate for three yearly fairs and a weekly Market at the town of Federate.
Not public and general	1695 c. 117 —	17 July 1695
Act in favors of Sir Robert Sinclair of Stevinson for two yearly fairs and a weekly Mercat at Penkaitland wester.
Not public and general	1695 c. 118 —	17 July 1695
Act in favours of John Rose of Nuik for two yearly fairs & a weekly Mercat upon the Lands of Nuik.
Not public and general	1695 c. 119 —	17 July 1695
Act in favours of James Craufurd of Montquhannie changing two fairs at Pitlessy.
Not public and general	1695 c. 120 —	17 July 1695
Act in favours of John Lord Murray for two yearly fairs at the toun of Stourar.
Not public and general	1695 c. 121 —	17 July 1695
Act in favours of the Earle of Lothian for a fair & a weekly Mercat at Newbottle.
Not public and general	1695 c. 122 —	17 July 1695
Act in favors of John Lennox of Woodhead for three yearly fairs & a weekly Mercat at the toun of Barorach.
Not public and general	1695 c. 123 —	17 July 1695
Act in favors of the Lord Duffus for two yearly fairs and a weekly Mercat at the kirktoun of Duffus.
Not public and general	1695 c. 124 —	17 July 1695
Act in favours of John Anderson of Westertoun for two yearly fairs at Newraine & Duckwel.
Not public and general	1695 c. 125 —	17 July 1695
Act in favours of the Earl of Cassilis for two yearly fairs & a weekly Mercat at the kirktoun of Straiton.
Not public and general	1695 c. 126 —	17 July 1695
Act in favours of the Earl of Melvill for two yearly fairs at Letham.
Not public and general	1695 c. 127 —	17 July 1695
Act in favors of Sr Colin Campbell of Aberuchill for four fairs yearly. Act in favour of Sir Colin Campbell of Aberuchill for four fairs yearly.
Not public and general	1695 c. 128 —	17 July 1695
Act in favours of William Cuningham brother german to the laird of Gilbertfield for a yearly fair & weekly mercat at the kirktoun of Kilbride.
Not public and general	1695 c. 129 —	17 July 1695
Ratification in favours of Sir John Hall of Dunglass of the lands of Dunglass &c. Ratification in favour of Sir John Hall of Dunglass of the lands of Dunglass etc.
Not public and general	1695 c. 130 —	17 July 1695
Ratification in favours of the Chirurgeons & Chirurgeon Apothecaries of Edinburgh. Ratification in favour of the Surgeons and Surgeon Apothecaries of Edinburgh.
Not public and general	1695 c. 131 —	17 July 1695
Ratification in favours of the Nyne Trades within the Burgh of Dundee. Ratification in favour of the Nine Trades within the Burgh of Dundee.
Not public and general	1695 c. 132 —	17 July 1695
Ratification in favours of the Burgh of Breichen of their Privileges. Ratification in favour of theBurgh of Brechin of their Privileges.
Not public and general	1695 c. 133 —	17 July 1695
Ratification in favors of the Candlemakers of Edinburgh of their privileges. Ratification in favour of the Candlemakers of Edinburgh of their privileges.
Not public and general	1695 c. 134 —	17 July 1695
Ratification in favors of the Walkers and Litsters of Dundee. Ratification in favour of the Waulkers and Litsters of Dundee.
Not public and general	1695 c. 135 —	17 July 1695
Ratification in favors of Alexander Spittell of Leuquhat of the Barony of Leuquhat. Ratification in favour of Alexander Spittall of Leuchat of the Barony of Leuquhat.
Not public and general	1695 c. 136 —	17 July 1695
Ratification in favors of the Periwig Makers discharging the exporting of Hair. Ratification in favour of the Periwig Makers discharging the export of Hair.
Not public and general	1695 c. 137 —	17 July 1695
Ratification in favours of James Lindsay of Dowhill of the Lands & Barony of Dowhill.
Not public and general	1695 c. 138 —	17 July 1695
Ratification in favors of the Coupars of Glasgow of their privileges. Ratification in favour of the Coopers of Glasgow of their privileges.
Not public and general	1695 c. 139 —	17 July 1695
Ratification in favors of William Fairlie of Bruntsfield of the Lands of Bruntsfield.
Not public and general	1695 c. 140 —	17 July 1695
Ratification in favors of William Mure of Rowallan of the Lands and Barrony of Rowallan.
Not public and general	1695 c. 141 —	17 July 1695
Ratification in favors of Sir William Stuart of Castlemilk of the Baronies of Castlemilk & Gourock.
Not public and general	1695 c. 142 —	17 July 1695
Ratification of the Viscount of Tarbat his Charter for two Oyster Scaps— Protestation City of Edinburgh against the same not recorded.
Not public and general	1695 c. 143 —	17 July 1695
Ratification in favors of Sir James Falconer of Phesdo of the Lands of Lawrieston.
Not public and general	1695 c. 144 —	17 July 1695
Ratification of the Lands of Kilbryd in favours of William Cunningham.
Not public and general	1695 c. 145 —	17 July 1695
Ratification in favours of James Turner Cabinet Maker.
Saving the Rights Act 1695 Not public and general	1695 c. 146; 1695 c. 44	17 July 1695
Act Salvo Jure Cujuslibet. Act Salvo Jure Cujuslibet.
Adjournment Act 1695	Vol. IX, p. 523; 1695 c. 45	17 July 1695
Act of adjournment. Act of adjournment.

=== Sources ===
- Alexander, William (1841). "Acta Parliamentorum Gulielmi et Mariæ". An Abridgement of the Acts of the Parliaments of Scotland. Edinburgh: Adam and Charles Black. pp. A80 – A83 – via Google Books.
- Alexander, William (1841). "Acta Parliamentorum Gulielmi et Mariæ". An Abridgement of the Acts of the Parliaments of Scotland. Edinburgh: Adam and Charles Black. pp. A80 – A83 – via Google Books.
- Chronological Table of the Statutes. London: Her Majesty's Stationery Office. 1972. pp. 1363–1364 – via Google Books.
- "Acts of the Old Scottish Parliament: 1695". legislation.gov.uk. The National Archives.
- "Index of Statutes: Index of Statutes: William II (1694-1702)". Records of the Parliaments of Scotland to 1707. University of St Andrews.

== See also ==
- List of legislation in the United Kingdom
- Records of the Parliaments of Scotland
