= List of acts of the Parliament of Scotland from 1696 =

This is a list of acts of the Parliament of Scotland for the year 1696.

It lists acts of Parliament of the old Parliament of Scotland, that was merged with the old Parliament of England to form the Parliament of Great Britain, by the Union with England Act 1707 (c. 7).

For other years, see list of acts of the Parliament of Scotland. For the period after 1707, see list of acts of the Parliament of Great Britain.

== 1696 ==
The 6th session of the parliament of William II, held in Edinburgh from 8 September 1696.

Short title, or popular name	Citation	Royal assent
Long title
Supply Act 1696 (repealed)	1696 c. 1 (Note: This is the citation in the Record Edition.); 1696 c. 1 (Note: This is the citation in the Duodecimal Edition.)	25 September 1696
Act anent the Supply of Eighteen Moneths Cess upon the Land Rent. Act regarding the Supply of Eighteen Month's Cess upon the Land Rent. (Repealed by Statute Law Revision (Scotland) Act 1906 (6 Edw. 7. c. 38))
Excise Act 1696 (repealed)	1696 c. 2; 1696 c. 2	25 September 1696
Act for an Additional Excise. Act for an Additional Excise. (Repealed by Statute Law Revision (Scotland) Act 1906 (6 Edw. 7. c. 38))
Public Officers Act 1696 (repealed)	1696 c. 3; 1696 c. 3	25 September 1696
Act appointing the Association to be Subscribed by all persons in publict trust. Act appointing the Association to be Subscribed to by all persons in public trust. (Repealed by Statute Law Revision (Scotland) Act 1906 (6 Edw. 7. c. 38))
Death Bed Act 1696 (repealed)	1696 c. 4; 1696 c. 4	25 September 1696
Act for regulateing Deeds done on death bed. Act for regulating Deeds done on a death bed. (Repealed by Statute Law Revision (Scotland) Act 1906 (6 Edw. 7. c. 38))
Bankruptcy Act 1696 (repealed)	1696 c. 5; 1696 c. 5	25 September 1696
Act for Declaring nottour Bankrupt. Act for declaring a notour Bankruptcy. (Repealed by Bankruptcy (Scotland) Act 1985 (c. 66))
Meal Act 1696 (repealed)	1696 c. 6; 1696 c. 6	25 September 1696
Act for Selling of Meal by weight. Act for Selling of Meal by weight. (Repealed by Statute Law Revision (Scotland) Act 1906 (6 Edw. 7. c. 38))
Rum Act 1696 (repealed)	1696 c. 7; 1696 c. 7	25 September 1696
Act allowing the Venting of Rum. Act allowing the Vending of Rum. (Repealed by Statute Law Revision (Scotland) Act 1906 (6 Edw. 7. c. 38))
Tutors and Curators Act 1696 (repealed)	1696 c. 8; 1696 c. 8	25 September 1696
Act anent the Nomination of Tutors and Curators. Act regarding the Nomination of Tutors and Curators. (Repealed by Age of Legal Capacity (Scotland) Act 1991 (c. 50))
Prescription Act 1696 (repealed)	1696 c. 9; 1696 c. 9	25 September 1696
Act of Prescription anent Tutors and Curators accompts. Act of Prescription regarding Tutors' and Curators' accounts. (Repealed by Prescription and Limitation (Scotland) Act 1973 (c. 52))
Procedure in Parliament Act 1696 (repealed)	1696 c. 10; 1696 c. 10	25 September 1696
Act that no Law pass at the first reading. Act that no Law pass at the first reading. (Repealed by Statute Law Revision (Scotland) Act 1906 (6 Edw. 7. c. 38))
Apparent Heirs Act 1696 (repealed)	1696 c. 11; 1696 c. 11	9 October 1696
Act Explanatory of the Act 1695 Entituled "Act for obviating the fraud of Appearand Heirs." (Note: Apparent Heirs Act 1695 (c. 39)); Act explaining the act of 1695, entitled, "Act for obviating the fraud of Apparent Heirs." (Repealed by Statute Law Revision (Scotland) Act 1906 (6 Edw. 7. c. 38))
Packing and Peeling Act 1696 (repealed)	1696 c. 12; 1696 c. 12	9 October 1696
Act anent the Privileges of Burgh of Regality and Barrony as to the Cureing and Packing of Salmond Fish. Act regarding the Privileges of Burghs of Regality and Barony as to the Curing and Packing of Salmon Fish. (Repealed by Statute Law Revision (Scotland) Act 1906 (6 Edw. 7. c. 38))
Vacant Churches Act 1696 (repealed)	1696 c. 13; 1696 c. 13	9 October 1696
Act in favors of Preachers at vacant Churches benorth Forth. Act in favour of Preachers at vacant Churches north of the Forth. (Repealed by Church Patronage (Scotland) Act 1711 (10 Ann. c. 21))
Universities Act 1696 (repealed)	1696 c. 14; 1696 c. 14	9 October 1696
Act in favors of Universities Schools and Hospitalls. Act in favour of Universities, Schools and Hospitals. (Repealed by Statute Law Revision (Scotland) Act 1964 (c. 80))
Deeds Act 1696 (repealed)	1696 c. 15; 1696 c. 15	9 October 1696
Act allowing Securities &c. to be written book wayes. Act allowing Securities etc. to be written in books. (Repealed by Requirements of Writing (Scotland) Act 1995 (c. 7))
Greenlaw Act 1696 (repealed)	1696 c. 16; 1696 c. 16	9 October 1696
Act declaring the Burgh of Greenlaw head Burgh of the Shire of Berwick. Act declaring the Burgh of Greenlaw to be the head Burgh of the Shire of Berwick. (Repealed by Berwickshire County Town Act 1903 (3 Edw. 7. c. 5))
Security of Kingdom Act 1696 (repealed)	1696 c. 17; 1696 c. 17	9 October 1696
Act for the Security of the Kingdom. Act for the Security of the Kingdom. (Repealed by Act of Security 1704 (c. 3))
Registration of Sasines Act 1696 (repealed)	1696 c. 18; 1696 c. 18	9 October 1696
Act anent Registration of Seasins and other writts and diligences. (Note: Sometimes called "Act anent Registration of Seasins and other writs and diligences"); Act anent Registration of Sasines and other writs and diligences. (Repealed by Statute Law Revision (Scotland) Act 1964 (c. 80))
Interuptions Act 1696 (repealed)	1696 c. 19; 1696 c. 19	9 October 1696
Act for Registration of Summonds that shall be made use of for Interruptions. Act for Registration of Summons that shall be used for Interruptions. (Repealed by Prescription and Limitation (Scotland) Act 1973 (c. 52))
Vitious Intromitters Act 1696 still in force	1696 c. 20; 1696 c. 20	9 October 1696
Act anent vitious Intromettors. Act regarding vicious Intromitters.
Aliments Act 1696 (repealed)	1696 c. 21; 1696 c. 21	9 October 1696
Act anent Aliments. Act regarding Aliments. (Repealed by Statute Law Revision (Scotland) Act 1906 (6 Edw. 7. c. 38))
Suspensions Act 1696 (repealed)	1696 c. 22; 1696 c. 22	9 October 1696
Act for Expenses in Suspensions. Act for Expenses in Suspensions. (Repealed by Statute Law Revision (Scotland) Act 1906 (6 Edw. 7. c. 38))
Defence of the Realm Act 1696 (repealed)	1696 c. 23; 1696 c. 23	9 October 1696
Act anent the Levy of a Thousand men. Act regarding the Levy of a Thousand men. (Repealed by Statute Law Revision (Scotland) Act 1906 (6 Edw. 7. c. 38))
Forfeited Estates Act 1696 (repealed)	1696 c. 24; 1696 c. 24	9 October 1696
Act for the better payment of the Creditors on forfault Estates. Act for the better payment of the Creditors of forfeited Estates. (Repealed by Statute Law Revision (Scotland) Act 1906 (6 Edw. 7. c. 38))
Blank Bonds and Trusts Act 1696 (repealed)	1696 c. 25; 1696 c. 25	9 October 1696
Act anent Blank Bonds and Trusts. Act regarding Blank Bonds and Trusts. (Repealed by Requirements of Writing (Scotland) Act 1995 (c. 7))
Education Act 1696 (repealed)	1696 c. 26; 1696 c. 26	9 October 1696
Act for the Settling of Schools. Act for the Settling of Schools. (Repealed by Education (Scotland) Act 1872 (35 & 36 Vict. c. 62))
Import of Victual Act 1696 (repealed)	1696 c. 27; 1696 c. 27	9 October 1696
Act approving the Proclamation of Council for encourageing the Import of Victuall. Act approving the Proclamation of Council for encouraging the Import of Victuals. (Repealed by Statute Law Revision (Scotland) Act 1906 (6 Edw. 7. c. 38))
Servants to Papists Act 1696 (repealed)	1696 c. 28; 1696 c. 28	9 October 1696
Act anent Protestant Servants in Popish Families. Act regarding Protestant servants in Catholic families. (Repealed by Statute Law Revision (Scotland) Act 1906 (6 Edw. 7. c. 38))
Poor Act 1696 (repealed)	1696 c. 29; 1696 c. 29	9 October 1696
Act for the better provideing the Poor and repressing of Beggars. Act for the better providing the Poor and repressing of Beggars. (Repealed by Statute Law Revision (Scotland) Act 1906 (6 Edw. 7. c. 38))
Supply (No. 2) Act 1696 (repealed)	1696 c. 30; 1696 c. 30	9 October 1696
Act ratifieing the Proclamation of Council anent the Pole 1695. Act ratifying the Proclamation of Council regading the poll, 1695. (Repealed by Statute Law Revision (Scotland) Act 1906 (6 Edw. 7. c. 38))
Profaneness Act 1696 (repealed)	1696 c. 31; 1696 c. 31	9 October 1696
Act against Prophaneness. Act against Profaneness. (Repealed by Statute Law Revision (Scotland) Act 1906 (6 Edw. 7. c. 38))
Prisons Act 1696 (repealed)	1696 c. 32; 1696 c. 32	9 October 1696
Act anent the Aliment of poor Prisoners. Act regarding the Aliment of poor Prisoners. (Repealed by Statute Law Revision (Scotland) Act 1906 (6 Edw. 7. c. 38))
Not public and general	1696 c. 33 — (Note: This act is not listed in the Duodecimal Edition.)	9 October 1696
Act for Erecting a New Sugar Manufactory at Glasgow. Act for Erecting a New Sugar Manufactory at Glasgow.
Not public and general	1696 c. 34 —	12 October 1696
Act for Building a Bridge over the Water of Avan. Act for building a bridge over the Water of Avon.
Salmon Act 1696 (repealed)	1696 c. 35; 1696 c. 33	12 October 1696
Act against Killers of Black Fish and Destroyers of the Fry and Smolts of Salmond. Act against Killers of Black Fish and Destroyers of the Fry and Smolts of Salmon. (Repealed by Salmon Act 1986 (c. 62))
Doune Act 1696 (repealed)	1696 c. 36; 1696 c. 34	12 October 1696
Act appointing Proclamations and other Legall Executions within the Stewartry of Monteith to be published and execute at the mercat cross of Doun in place of the Tapaltae. Act appointing Proclamations and other Legal Executions within the Stewartry of Menteith to be published and executed at the market cross of Doune in place of the Tapaltae. (Repealed by Statute Law Revision (Scotland) Act 1906 (6 Edw. 7. c. 38))
Duels Act 1696 (repealed)	1696 c. 37; 1696 c. 35	12 October 1696
Act against Duells. Act against Duels. (Repealed by Duelling (Scotland) Act 1819 (59 Geo. 3. c. 70))
Inland Bills Act 1696 still in force	1696 c. 38; 1696 c. 36	12 October 1696
Act anent Inland Bills and Precepts. Act about Inland Bills and Precepts.
Malt Measures Act 1696 (repealed)	1696 c. 39; 1696 c. 37	12 October 1696
Act anent the Measuring of Malt. Act about the Measuring of Malt. (Repealed by Statute Law Revision (Scotland) Act 1906 (6 Edw. 7. c. 38))
Coinage Act 1696 (repealed)	1696 c. 40; 1696 c. 38	12 October 1696
Act anent the old Fourteen shilling pieces and their Halfs. Act about the old Fourteen shilling pieces and their Halfs. (Repealed by Statute Law Revision (Scotland) Act 1906 (6 Edw. 7. c. 38))
Registration Act 1696 still in force	1696 c. 41; 1696 c. 39	12 October 1696
Act anent Registration of Writts after the Graneters demise. (Note: Also rendered as 'Act anent Registration of Writts after the Granters decease.'); Act about Registration of Writs after the Granter's death.
Not public and general	1696 c. 42 —	12 October 1696
Act in favors of John Hamilton for Sheeling and Preparing of Barley. Act in favour of John Hamilton for Shelling and Preparing Barley.
Justiciary Act 1696 (repealed)	1696 c. 43; 1696 c. 40	12 October 1696
Act Prorogating the Commission of Justiciary for the Highlands. Act Suspending the Commission of Justiciary for the Highlands. (Repealed by Statute Law Revision (Scotland) Act 1906 (6 Edw. 7. c. 38))
Pupils Act 1696 (repealed)	1696 c. 44; 1696 c. 41	12 October 1696
Act declaring Minors free from Personall Execution for Civill Causes dureing their Pupillarity. Act declaring Minors free from Personal Execution for Civil Causes during their Minority. (Repealed by Statute Law Revision (Scotland) Act 1906 (6 Edw. 7. c. 38))
Coining Act 1696 (repealed)	1696 c. 45; 1696 c. 42	12 October 1696
Act against false Coyning and Clipping of Money. Act against false Coining and Clipping of Money. (Repealed by Statute Law Revision (Scotland) Act 1906 (6 Edw. 7. c. 38))
Salt in Ale Act 1696 (repealed)	1696 c. 46; 1696 c. 43	12 October 1696
Act discharging the makeing use of Salt in brewing Ale or Beer. Act prohibiting the use of Salt in brewing Ale or Beer. (Repealed by Statute Law Revision (Scotland) Act 1906 (6 Edw. 7. c. 38))
Salt Act 1696 (repealed)	1696 c. 47; 1696 c. 44	12 October 1696
Act for makeing Salt upon Salt. Act for making Salt upon Salt. (Repealed by Statute Law Revision (Scotland) Act 1906 (6 Edw. 7. c. 38))
Not public and general	1696 c. 48 —	12 October 1696
Act in favors of Sir John Shaw of Greenock (Note: Sir John Shaw, 2nd Baronet.) and others for makeing Salt after a new manner. Act in favour of Sir John Shaw of Greenock, and others, for making salt in a new way.
Not public and general	1696 c. 49 —	12 October 1696
Act in favors of M^{r} William Erskine for makeing Salt upon Salt. Act in favour of Mr William Erskine for making Salt upon Salt.
Not public and general	1696 c. 50 —	12 October 1696
Act in favors of the Magistrats of Edinburgh and M^{r} James Smith for bringing water into Burghs & other places needfull. Act in favour of the Magistrates of Edinburgh, and Mr James Smith, for bringing water into burghs and other places it is needed.
Not public and general	1696 c. 51 —	12 October 1696
Ratification in favors of Ludovick Grant of that Ilk (Note: Ludovick Grant of Grant.) of the Lands Barony and Regality of Grant. Ratification in favour of Ludovic Grant of Grant, of the Lands, Barony and Regality of Grant.
Not public and general	1696 c. 52 —	12 October 1696
Ratification of their Majesties Gift and Mortification in favors of the Second Minister of Dumfreis. Ratification of their Majesties' Gift and Mortification in favour of the second minister of Dumfries.
Not public and general	1696 c. 53 —	12 October 1696
Ratification in favors of William Stewart of Castlestewart of the Lands and Barony of Castlestewart. Ratification in favour of William Stewart of Castle Stewart, of the Lands and Barony of Castle Stewart.
Not public and general	1696 c. 54 —	12 October 1696
Ratification in favors of Archibald Crawford of Auchinames of the Lands and Barrony of Auchinames. Ratification in favour of Archibald Crawford of Auchenames of the Lands and Barony of Auchenames.
Not public and general	1696 c. 55 —	12 October 1696
Ratification in favors of Alexander Gellie of Blackford of the Lands and Barrony of Blackford. Ratification in favour of Alexander Gellie of Blackford of the Lands and Barony of Blackford.
Not public and general	1696 c. 56 —	12 October 1696
Ratification in favors of Sir Colin Campbell of Aberuchill and James Campbell his eldest lawful son of the Lands and Barony of Aberuchill. Ratification in favour of Sir Colin Campbell of Aberuchill, and James Campbell, his eldest lawful son, of the Lands and Barony of Aberuchill.
Not public and general	1696 c. 57 —	12 October 1696
Ratification in favors of Sir Patrick Home of Lumsdene Advocat of the Lands and Barony of Lumsdene. Ratification in favour of Sir Patrick Home of Lumsden, Advocate, of the Lands and Barony of Lumsden.
Not public and general	1696 c. 58 —	12 October 1696
Ratification in favors of John Stewart of Inuernytie of the Barony of Inuernytie. Ratification in favour of John Stewart of Invernetty of the Barony of Invernetty.
Not public and general	1696 c. 59 —	12 October 1696
Ratification in favors of James Montgomery younger of Lainshaw of the Lands of Over Casiltoun &c. Ratification in favour of James Montgomery the younger, of Lainshaw, of the Lands of Over Castleton, etc.
Not public and general	1696 c. 60 —	12 October 1696
Ratification of ane Letter of Gift for making of Sail Cloath in favors M^{r} James Melvill of Halhill Robert Master of Burghlie (Note: Robert Balfour, 4th Lord Balfour of Burleigh.) and James Melvill of Casingray. Ratification of a Letter of Gift for making Sail Cloth, in favour of Mr James Melville of Halhill, Robert, Master of Burleigh, and James Melville of Cassingray.
Not public and general	1696 c. 61 —	12 October 1696
Ratification in favors of the Principalls and other Masters of S_{t} Salvator (Note: St Salvator's College, St Andrews.) and S^{t} Leonards (Note: St Leonard's College, St Andrews.) Colledges in the University of S_{t} Andrews. Ratification in favour of the Principals and other Masters of St Salvator's and St Leonard's Colleges in the University of St Andrews.
Not public and general	1696 c. 62 —	12 October 1696
Ratification in favors of Ann Dutchess of Hamilton (Note: Anne Hamilton, 3rd Duchess of Hamilton.) of the Teynds of Cambusnethan. Ratification in favour of Anne, Duchess of Hamilton, of the Teinds of Cambusnethan.
Not public and general	1696 c. 63 —	12 October 1696
Act in favors of Ann Dutches of Hamilton for changeing the fair at the town of Strathaven. Act in favour of Anne, Duchess of Hamilton, for changing the fair at the town of Strathaven.
Not public and general	1696 c. 64 —	12 October 1696
Act in favors of John Marques of Athol (Note: John Murray, 1st Marquess of Atholl.) for two weekly mercats at Blair of Athole and Dalgairn in Stratharle. Act in favour of John, Marquis of Atholl, for two weekly markets at Blair Atholl and Dalgairn in Strathardle.
Not public and general	1696 c. 65 —	12 October 1696
Act in favors of Sir John Shaw of Greenock for three yearly fairs at the town of Greenock. Act in favour of Sir John Shaw of Greenock, for three fairs a year at the town of Greenock.
Not public and general	1696 c. 66 —	12 October 1696
Act in favors of Alexander Forbes of Ludquhairn for three yearly fairs at Lennabo in Aberdeenshire. Act in favour of Alexander Forbes of Ludquhairn, for three fairs a year at Lennabo in Aberdeenshire.
Not public and general	1696 c. 67 —	12 October 1696
Act in favors of the Burgh of Anstruther Easter for changeing the fair of the said Burgh. Act in favour of the Burgh of Anstruther Easter for changing the fair of the said Burgh.
Not public and general	1696 c. 68 —	12 October 1696
Act in favors of Mr Robert Forbes senior Advocat for four yearly fairs at Torphins. Act in favour of Mr Robert Forbes senior, Advocate, for four fairs a year at Torphins.
Not public and general	1696 c. 69 —	12 October 1696
Act in favors of William Lord Bargany (Note: William Hamilton, 3rd Lord Bargany.) for two yearly fairs at the Kirktoun of Newdaylie. Act in favour of William, Lord Bargany, for two fairs a year at the town of New Dailly.
Not public and general	1696 c. 70 —	12 October 1696
Act in favors of Sir Thomas Burnet of Leys (Note: Sir Thomas Burnett, 3rd Baronet.) for two yearly fairs at the toun of Cowie. Act in favour of Sir Thomas Burnett of Leys, for two fairs a year, at the town of Cowie.
Not public and general	1696 c. 71 —	12 October 1696
Act in favors of ... Frazer of Strichen for two yearly fairs at the Chapellmuir of Strichen. Act in favour of ... Fraser, for two fairs a year at the Chapelmuir of Strichen.
Not public and general	1696 c. 72 —	12 October 1696
Act in favors of John Grant of Ballandalloch for three yearly fairs and a weekly mercat at Inveravan. Act in favour of John Grant of Ballindalloch, for three fairs a year, and a market at Inveraven.
Not public and general	1696 c. 73 —	12 October 1696
Act in favors of Patrick Home of Westrestoun for two yearly fairs and a weekly mercat at the toun of Westrestoun. Act in favour of Patrick Home of West Reston, for two fairs a year, and a weelly market at the town of West Reston.
Not public and general	1696 c. 74 —	12 October 1696
Act in favors of Patrick Murray of Levingstoun for three yearly fairs and a weekly mercat at the town of Blackburn. Act in favour of Patrick Murray of Livingston, for three fairs a year, and a market at the town of Blackburn.
Not public and general	1696 c. 75 —	12 October 1696
Act in favors of William Stewart of Castlestewart for changeing two fairs and a mercat at Newtounstewart. Ratification in favour of William Stewart of Castle Stewart, for changing two fairs and a market at Newton Stewart.
Not public and general	1696 c. 76 —	12 October 1696
Act in favors of Sir William Douglas of Cavers for two yearly fairs at the toun of Denholm. Act in favour of Sir William Douglas of Cavers, for two fairs a year at the town of Denholm.
Not public and general	1696 c. 77 —	12 October 1696
Act in favors of Sir Hugh Paterson of Bannockburn (Note: Sir Hugh Paterson, 1st Baronet.) for two yearly fairs and a weekly mercat betwixt Shcockmure and the town of Nether Bannockburn. Act in favour of Sir Hugh Paterson of Bannockburn, for two fairs a year and a weekly market between Skeochmuir and the town of Nether Bannockburn.
Not public and general	1696 c. 78 —	12 October 1696
Act for two yearly fairs at the Toun of Kingsbarns in Fyfe. Act for two fairs a year at the Town of Kingsbarns in Fife.
Not public and general	1696 c. 79 —	12 October 1696
Act in favors of John Anderson of Westrestoun for a weekly mercat at the Kirk of Botriffnie. Act in favour of John Anderson of Westerton, for a weekly market at the Church of Botriphnie.
Not public and general	1696 c. 80 —	12 October 1696
Act in favors of David Erskine of Dun for ane yearly fair at the moor of Dun. Act in favour of David Erskine of Dun, for a yearly fair at the muir of Dun.
Not public and general	1696 c. 81 —	12 October 1696
Act in favors of Sir Alexander Cumming of Culter (Note: Sir Alexander Cumming, 1st Baronet.) for two yearly fairs upon the muir of Beinshill. Act in favour of Sir Alexander Cumming of Culter, for two fairs a year upon the muir of Beanshill.
Saving the Rights Act 1696 Not public and general	1696 c. 83; 1696 c. 45	12 October 1696
Act Salvo jure Cujuslibet. Act Salvo jure Cujuslibet.
Adjournment Act 1696	Vol. X, p. 112; 1696 c. 46	12 October 1696
Act of adjournment. Act of adjournment.

=== Sources ===
- Alexander, William (1841). "Acta Parliamentorum Gulielmi et Mariæ". An Abridgement of the Acts of the Parliaments of Scotland. Edinburgh: Adam and Charles Black. pp. A83 – A84 – via Google Books.
- Alexander, William (1841). "Acta Parliamentorum Gulielmi et Mariæ". An Abridgement of the Acts of the Parliaments of Scotland. Edinburgh: Adam and Charles Black. pp. A83 – A84 – via Google Books.
- Chronological Table of the Statutes. London: Her Majesty's Stationery Office. 1972. pp. 1365–1366 – via Google Books.
- "Acts of the Old Scottish Parliament: 1696". legislation.gov.uk. The National Archives.
- "Index of Statutes: Index of Statutes: William II (1694-1702)". Records of the Parliaments of Scotland to 1707. University of St Andrews.

== See also ==
- List of legislation in the United Kingdom
- Records of the Parliaments of Scotland
