= List of acts of the Parliament of Scotland from 1600 =

This is a list of acts of the Parliament of Scotland for the year 1600.

It lists acts of Parliament of the old Parliament of Scotland, that was merged with the old Parliament of England to form the Parliament of Great Britain, by the Union with England Act 1707 (c. 7).

For other years, see list of acts of the Parliament of Scotland. For the period after 1707, see list of acts of the Parliament of Great Britain.

== 1600 ==
The 16th parliament of James VI, held in Edinburgh from 1 November 1600 until 15 November 1600.

Short title, or popular name	Citation	Royal assent
Long title
Forfeiture of the Earl of Gowrie Act 1600 Not public and general	1600 c. 1 (Note: This is the citation in the Record Edition.) — (Note: This act is not listed in the Duodecimal Edition.)	15 November 1600
Act anent the dishereising and inhabilitie of the brether and posteritie of the erle of Gowrie. (Note: John Ruthven, 3rd Earl of Gowrie.); Act regarding the disinheriting and inability of the brother and posterity of the Earl of Gowrie.
Name of Ruthven Act 1600 Not public and general	1600 c. 2 —	15 November 1600
Act aboleissing the surname of Ruthven. Act abolishing the surname of Ruthven.
Thanksgiving Day Act 1600 (repealed)	1600 c. 3; 1600 c. 1 (Note: This is the citation in the Duodecimal Edition.)	15 November 1600
The fyft day of August appointit yeirlie for solempne thankis geving in all tyme cummyng. The Fifth day of August appointed yearly for solemn thanksgiving in all time coming. (Repealed by Statute Law Revision (Scotland) Act 1906 (6 Edw. 7. c. 38))
Not public and general	1600 c. 4; 1600 c. 2	15 November 1600
Act of annexatioun of the foirfaltit landis and utheris to the Crowne. Act of annexation of the forfeited lands and others to the Crown.
Not public and general	1600 c. 5 —	15 November 1600
Act in favouris of Sir Thomas Erskene. (Note: Thomas Erskine, 1st Earl of Kellie.); Act in favour of Sir Thomas Erskine.
Not public and general	1600 c. 6 —	15 November 1600
Act in favouris of the said Sir Thomas Erskene of ane yeirlie pensioun of tuelf chalderis victuall. Act in favour of the said Sir Thomas Erskine of a yearly pension of twelve chalders of victual.
Not public and general	1600 c. 7 —	15 November 1600
Act in favouris of Sir Hew Heres anent his pensioun of tuentie chalderis victuall. Act in favour of Sir Hugh Herries regarding his pension of twenty chalders of victual.
Not public and general	1600 c. 8 —	15 November 1600
Act in favouris of Sir Johne Ramsay anent ane infeftment to be maid to him of the landis of Eist Barnis. Act in favour of Sir John Ramsay regarding an infeftment to be made to him of the lands of East Barns.
Not public and general	1600 c. 9 —	15 November 1600
Act in favouris of Sir Hew Heres anent ane infeftment to be maid to him of the landis of Cowsland and tuentie chalderis victuall furth of Scone. Act in favour of Sir Hugh Herries regarding an infeftment to be made to him of the lands of Cousland, and twenty chalders of victual out of Scone.
Not public and general	1600 c. 10; 1600 c. 3	15 November 1600
Act in favouris of the vassellis of the erldome of Gowrie. Act in favour of the vassals of the earldom of Gowrie.
Not public and general	1600 c. 11 —	15 November 1600
Act in favouris of James Lundy. Act in favour of James Lundie.
Privy Councillors Act 1600 (repealed)	1600 c. 12; 1600 c. 4	15 November 1600
Anent invading and persewing of counsalouris. Regarding invading and pursuing of councillors. (Repealed by Statute Law Revision (Scotland) Act 1906 (6 Edw. 7. c. 38))
Purprision Act 1600 (repealed)	1600 c. 13; 1600 c. 5	15 November 1600
Anent purprusioun in the Kingis commonteis. Regarding purpresture in the king's commonties. (Repealed by Statute Law Revision (Scotland) Act 1906 (6 Edw. 7. c. 38))
Firearms Act 1600 (repealed)	1600 c. 14; 1600 c. 6	15 November 1600
Anent beraris and schuteris with hagbuttis and pistolettis. Regarding bearers and shooters with hackbuts and pistols. (Repealed by Statute Law Revision (Scotland) Act 1906 (6 Edw. 7. c. 38))
Ursury Act 1600 (repealed)	1600 c. 15; 1600 c. 7	15 November 1600
Explanatioun of the actis of Parliament anent ocker and usurie. Explanation of the acts of Parliament regarding ocker and usury. (Repealed by Statute Law Revision (Scotland) Act 1906 (6 Edw. 7. c. 38))
Coal Mines Act 1600 (repealed)	1600 c. 16; 1600 c. 8	15 November 1600
Anent dissolutioun of the coilhewchis of the propirtie and landis quhair demolessit strenthis and castellis wer biggit of auld. Regarding dissolution of the coal pits of the property and lands where demolished strengths and castles were built of old. (Repealed by Statute Law Revision (Scotland) Act 1906 (6 Edw. 7. c. 38))
Not public and general	1600 c. 17 —	15 November 1600
Anent the posteritie of Francis (Note: Francis Stewart, 5th Earl of Bothwell.) sumtyme erle Bothuell. Regarding the posterity of Francis, sometime earl of Bothwell.
Currency Act 1600 (repealed)	1600 c. 18; 1600 c. 9	15 November 1600
Act anent cunyie. Act regarding coinage. (Rrepealed by Statute Law Revision (Scotland) Act 1906 (6 Edw. 7. c. 38))
Herring Act 1600 (repealed)	1600 c. 19; 1600 c. 10	15 November 1600
Act anent salting and transporting of hering. Act about salting and transporting of herring. (Repealed by Statute Law Revision (Scotland) Act 1906 (6 Edw. 7. c. 38))
Salmon Act 1600 (repealed)	1600 c. 20; 1600 c. 11	15 November 1600
Slaying of salmond in forbiddin tyme to be ane cryme of theift in tyme cummyng. Slaying of salmon in forbidden time to be a crime of theft in time coming. (Repealed by Statute Law Revision (Scotland) Act 1906 (6 Edw. 7. c. 38))
Duels Act 1600 (repealed)	1600 c. 21; 1600 c. 12	15 November 1600
Anent singular combattis. Regarding singular combats. (Repealed by Duelling (Scotland) Act 1819 (59 Geo. 3. c. 70))
Hornings Act 1600 (repealed)	1600 c. 22; 1600 c. 13	15 November 1600
Anent hornyngis. Regarding hornings. (Repealed by Debtors (Scotland) Act 1987 (c. 18))
Crown Proceedings Act 1600 still in force	1600 c. 23; 1600 c. 14	15 November 1600
The negligence of the kingis officiaris may be supplyit be thair successouris. The negligence of the king's officers may be supplied by their successors.
Customs Act 1600 (repealed)	1600 c. 24; 1600 c. 15	15 November 1600
The pane of forbiddin and uncustumat gudis. The pain of forbidden and uncustomed goods. (Repealed by Statute Law Revision (Scotland) Act 1906 (6 Edw. 7. c. 38))
Church Act 1600 (repealed)	1600 c. 25; 1600 c. 16	15 November 1600
Ratificatioun of the actis maid of befoir in favouris of the kirk. Ratification of acts previously made in favour of the church. (Repealed by Statute Law Revision (Scotland) Act 1906 (6 Edw. 7. c. 38))
Non-communicants Act 1600 (repealed)	1600 c. 26; 1600 c. 17	15 November 1600
Act anent non communicantis. Act about non-communicants. (Repealed by Statute Law Revision (Scotland) Act 1906 (6 Edw. 7. c. 38))
Jesuits Act 1600 (repealed)	1600 c. 27; 1600 c. 18	15 November 1600
Ratificatioun of the act anent Jesuittis preistis excommunicat and traffiquing papistis. Ratification of the act regarding Jesuits, priests excommunicate and trafficking papists. (Repealed by Statute Law Revision (Scotland) Act 1906 (6 Edw. 7. c. 38))
Beggars Act 1600 (repealed)	1600 c. 28; 1600 c. 19	15 November 1600
Ratificatioun of the act anent strang and idill beggeris. Ratification of the act regarding strong and idle beggars. (Repealed by Statute Law Revision (Scotland) Act 1906 (6 Edw. 7. c. 38))
Marriage of Adulterers Act 1600 (repealed)	1600 c. 29; 1600 c. 20	15 November 1600
Anent the mariage of adulterous personis. About the marriage of adulterous persons. (Repealed by Statute Law Revision (Scotland) Act 1964 (c. 80))
Registers Act 1600 (repealed)	1600 c. 30; 1600 c. 21	15 November 1600
Registeris of the schirefclerkis to be markit be the Clerk of Register and his deputtis and thair extractis to be markit be thame selffis. Registers of the sheriff clerks to be marked by the clerk register and his deputes, and their extracts to be marked by themselves. (Repealed by Statute Law Revision (Scotland) Act 1964 (c. 80))
Public Peace Act 1600 (repealed)	1600 c. 31; 1600 c. 22	15 November 1600
Act anent removeing and extinguischeing of deadlie feadis. Act regarding removing and extinguishing of deadly feuds. (Repealed by Statute Law Revision (Scotland) Act 1906 (6 Edw. 7. c. 38))
Defence of the Realm Act 1600 (repealed)	1600 c. 32; 1600 c. 23	15 November 1600
Act anent provisioun for armoure. Act about provision for armour. (Repealed by Statute Law Revision (Scotland) Act 1906 (6 Edw. 7. c. 38))
Border Hostages Act 1600 (repealed)	1600 c. 33; 1600 c. 28	15 November 1600
Act anent the keiping of pledgis. Act about the keeping of pledges. (Repealed by Statute Law Revision (Scotland) Act 1906 (6 Edw. 7. c. 38))
Game Act 1600 (repealed)	1600 c. 34 —	15 November 1600
Act aganis slauchter of wyld foullis. Act against the killing of wildfowl. (Repealed by Statute Law Revision (Scotland) Act 1906 (6 Edw. 7. c. 38))
Theft and Redress Act 1600 (repealed)	1600 c. 35 —	15 November 1600
Act aganis making of redres. Act against the making of redress. (Repealed by Statute Law Revision (Scotland) Act 1906 (6 Edw. 7. c. 38))
Sasines Act 1600 (repealed)	1600 c. 36 —	15 November 1600
Anent registratioun of saisingis. About the registration of sasines. (Repealed by Statute Law Revision (Scotland) Act 1906 (6 Edw. 7. c. 38))
Customs (No. 2) Act 1600 (repealed)	1600 c. 37; 1600 c. 24	15 November 1600
Anent the custumyng of gudis. About the customs of goods. (Repealed by Statute Law Revision (Scotland) Act 1906 (6 Edw. 7. c. 38))
Hornings (No. 2) Act 1600 (repealed)	1600 c. 38; 1600 c. 25	15 November 1600
All charges of hornyng aganis persones duelland benorth Die to be direct upoun fyftene dayes at the leist. All charges of horning against persons dwelling to the north of Dee to be directed upon fifteen days at the least. (Repealed by Statute Law Revision (Scotland) Act 1906 (6 Edw. 7. c. 38))
Royal Palaces Act 1600 (repealed)	1600 c. 39; 1600 c. 26	15 November 1600
Act aganis persones quha persewis utheris within ane myle of the Kingis Majesteis residence. Act against persons who pursue others within a mile of the king's majesty's residence. (Repealed by Statute Law Revision (Scotland) Act 1906 (6 Edw. 7. c. 38))
Not public and general	1600 c. 40 —	15 November 1600
Act in favouris of Sir Patrick Murray anent the abbacie of Ferne. Act in favour of Sir Patrick Murray regarding the abbacy of Fearn.
Not public and general	1600 c. 41 —	15 November 1600
Act in favouris of Johne marques of Hammyltoun (Note: John Hamilton, 1st Marquess of Hamilton.) and lord James Hammyltoun (Note: James Hamilton, 2nd Marquess of Hamilton.) his sone. Act in favour of John, marquis of Hamilton, and Lord James Hamilton, his son.
Not public and general	1600 c. 42 —	15 November 1600
Ratificatioun in favouris of the countes of Mar of hir infeftment of the hanyng.
Not public and general	1600 c. 43 —	15 November 1600
Ratificatioun in favouris of the countes of Mar anent the discharge of hir duetie in bringing up of the prince.
Not public and general	1600 c. 44 —	15 November 1600
Act in favouris of the constable of Dundie anent the bering of our soverane lordis banner.
Not public and general	1600 c. 45 —	15 November 1600
Act in favouris of my lord Home anent the thriddis of Coldinghame.
Not public and general	1600 c. 46 —	15 November 1600
Ratificatioun in favouris of Mr Petir Young.
Not public and general	1600 c. 47 —	15 November 1600
Act in favouris of the laird of Bogie and Maister Johne Moncreif.
Not public and general	1600 c. 48 —	15 November 1600
Act in favouris of the duik of Lennox anent the thriddis of Sanctandrois.
Not public and general	1600 c. 49 —	15 November 1600
Ratificatioun of Sir George Home of the burgh of Greinlaw.
Not public and general	1600 c. 50 —	15 November 1600
Ratificatioun in favouris of Patrik Leslie.
Stonehaven Act 1600; Not public and general	1600 c. 51; 1600 c. 27	15 November 1600
Anent the courte place of the schirefdome of Mernis.
Precedence Act 1600 (repealed)	1600 c. 52 —	15 November 1600
Commissioun anent the ranking of the nobilmen. Commission regarding the ranking of noblemen. (Repealed by Statute Law Revision (Scotland) Act 1906 (6 Edw. 7. c. 38))
Wool Act 1600 (repealed)	1600 c. 53 —	15 November 1600
Commissioun anent woll. Commission regarding wool. (Repealed by Statute Law Revision (Scotland) Act 1906 (6 Edw. 7. c. 38))
Not public and general	1600 c. 54 —	15 November 1600
The decisioun of the richt of the monkis portionis of Abirbrothok betuix the marques of Hamyltoun and laird of Auldbar (Note: Thomas Lyon (of Auldbar).) Remittit to the nixt Parliament. The decision of the right of the monks' portions of Arbroath between the marquis of Hamilton and the laird of Auldbar remitted to the next parliament.
Not public and general	1600 c. 55 —	15 November 1600
Ratificatioun of the infeftment of Lewis. Ratification of the infeftment of Lewis.
Not public and general	1600 c. 56 —	15 November 1600
Act in favouris of the fewaris of the landis lyand within the erldome of Fyff. Act in favour of the feuars of the lands lying within the earldom of Fife.
Not public and general	1600 c. 57 —	15 November 1600
Ratificatioun of the bischop of Glasgowis (Note: James Beaton (archbishop of Glasgow).) restitutioun. Ratification of the bishop of Glasgow's restitution.

=== Sources ===
- Alexander, William (1841). "Acta Parliamentorum Regis Jacobi Sexti". An Abridgement of the Acts of the Parliaments of Scotland. Edinburgh: Adam and Charles Black. pp. A37–A38 – via Google Books.
- Alexander, William (1841). "Acta Parliamentorum Regis Jacobi Sexti". An Abridgement of the Acts of the Parliaments of Scotland. Edinburgh: Adam and Charles Black. pp. A37–A38 – via Google Books.
- Chronological Table of the Statutes. London: Her Majesty's Stationery Office. 1972. p. 1345 – via Google Books.
- "Acts of the Old Scottish Parliament: 1600". legislation.gov.uk. The National Archives.
- "Index of Statutes: Index of Statutes: James VI (1567-1625)". Records of the Parliaments of Scotland to 1707. University of St Andrews.

== See also ==
- List of legislation in the United Kingdom
- Records of the Parliaments of Scotland
