= List of acts of the Parliament of Scotland from 1633 =

This is a list of acts of the Parliament of Scotland for the year 1633.

It lists acts of Parliament of the old Parliament of Scotland, that was merged with the old Parliament of England to form the Parliament of Great Britain, by the Union with England Act 1707 (c. 7).

For other years, see list of acts of the Parliament of Scotland. For the period after 1707, see list of acts of the Parliament of Great Britain.

== 1633 ==
The 1st parliament of Charles I, held in Edinburgh from 18 June 1633.

Short title, or popular name	Citation	Royal assent
Long title
Supply Act 1633 (repealed)	1633 c. 1 (Note: This is the citation in the Record Edition.); 1633 c. 1 (Note: This is the citation in the Duodecimal Edition.)	28 June 1633
Act anent the taxatioun grantit to his Majestie of threttie schillings tearmlie upon the pound land and the saxteinth pennie of all annuelrents. (Repealed by Statute Law Revision (Scotland) Act 1906 (6 Edw. 7. c. 38))
Supply (No. 2) Act 1633 (repealed)	1633 c. 2; 1633 c. 2	28 June 1633
Act anent the collecting and inbringing of the Taxatione and releife to prelates. (Repealed by Statute Law Revision (Scotland) Act 1906 (6 Edw. 7. c. 38))
Sovereignty Act 1633 still in force	1633 c. 3; 1633 c. 3	28 June 1633
Anent his Majesties royall prerogative and Apparell of kirkmen.
Religion Act 1633 (repealed)	1633 c. 4; 1633 c. 4	28 June 1633
Ratificatioun of the actes toutching religione. (Repealed by Statute Law Revision (Scotland) Act 1906 (6 Edw. 7. c. 38))
Education Act 1633 (repealed)	1633 c. 5; 1633 c. 5	28 June 1633
Ratificatioun of the act of counsall anent plantatione of Schooless. (Repealed by Statute Law Revision (Scotland) Act 1906 (6 Edw. 7. c. 38))
Charitable Bequests Act 1633 (repealed)	1633 c. 6; 1633 c. 6	28 June 1633
Act against the inverting of pious donationes. (Repealed by Statute Law Revision (Scotland) Act 1906 (6 Edw. 7. c. 38))
Invading of Ministers Act 1633 (repealed)	1633 c. 7; 1633 c. 7	28 June 1633
Act anent invading of ministers. (Repealed by Statute Law Revision (Scotland) Act 1964 (c. 80))
Ministers' Stipends Act 1633 (repealed)	1633 c. 8; 1633 c. 8	28 June 1633
Ratificatioun of the act of commissioun anent the ministers provisiounes. (Repealed by Statute Law Revision (Scotland) Act 1906 (6 Edw. 7. c. 38))
Revocation Act 1633 (repealed)	1633 c. 9; 1633 c. 9	28 June 1633
The Kings generall revocatione. (Repealed by Statute Law Revision (Scotland) Act 1906 (6 Edw. 7. c. 38))
Not public and general	1633 c. 10; 1633 c. 9	28 June 1633
Act anent annexatione of his Majesties propertie.
Not public and general	1633 c. 11; 1633 c. 10	28 June 1633
Act of Dissolutione.
Interruptions Act 1633 (repealed)	1633 c. 12; 1633 c. 12	28 June 1633
Ratificatioun of the actes of interruptione. (Repealed by Statute Law Revision (Scotland) Act 1906 (6 Edw. 7. c. 38))
Not public and general	1633 c. 13; 1633 c. 13	28 June 1633
Act anent regalities of erectiones.
Not public and general	1633 c. 14; 1633 c. 14	28 June 1633
Act anent superiorities of kirkelands.
Teinds Act 1633 (repealed)	1633 c. 15; 1633 c. 15	28 June 1633
Act anent his Majesties annuitie of Teinds. (Repealed by Statute Law Revision (Scotland) Act 1964 (c. 80))
Ward Holding Act 1633 (repealed)	1633 c. 16; 1633 c. 16	28 June 1633
Act anent vassalles holding ward. (Repealed by Statute Law Revision (Scotland) Act 1906 (6 Edw. 7. c. 38))
Teinds (No. 2) Act 1633 (repealed)	1633 c. 17; 1633 c. 17	28 June 1633
Act anent the rate and pryce of Teinds. (Repealed by Statute Law Revision (Scotland) Act 1964 (c. 80))
Exchequer Act 1633 (repealed)	1633 c. 18; 1633 c. 18	28 June 1633
Act anent the Exchequer. (Repealed by Statute Law Revision (Scotland) Act 1906 (6 Edw. 7. c. 38))
Valuation of Teinds Act 1633 (repealed)	1633 c. 19; 1633 c. 19	28 June 1633
Commissione for valuatione of teinds not valued rectifieing of the valuationes of the same alreadie maid and other particulars thairin contenit. (Repealed by Statute Law Revision (Scotland) Act 1964 (c. 80))
Teind Commission Act 1633 (repealed)	1633 c. 20; 1633 c. 20	28 June 1633
Act anent the King his designatione of the names to be insert in the commissiones Anent the tithes and lawes. (Repealed by Statute Law Revision (Scotland) Act 1906 (6 Edw. 7. c. 38))
Usury Act 1633 (repealed)	1633 c. 21; 1633 c. 21	28 June 1633
Act anent the annuell of aucht to be takin of ilk hundreth in tyme to come allanerlie suspending the same for thrie yeirs And in the interim tuo of ten to be payit for the said space to his Majestie. (Repealed by Statute Law Revision (Scotland) Act 1906 (6 Edw. 7. c. 38))
Supply (No. 3) Act 1633 (repealed)	1633 c. 22; 1633 c. 22	28 June 1633
Act anent the Lordes of Sessione thair taxatioun of ten shillings to be imposed upon everie pund of land of old extent. (Repealed by Statute Law Revision (Scotland) Act 1906 (6 Edw. 7. c. 38))
College of Justice Act 1633 (repealed)	1633 c. 23; 1633 c. 23	28 June 1633
Ratificatioun of the liberties of the Colledge of Justice. (Repealed by Statute Law Revision (Scotland) Act 1906 (6 Edw. 7. c. 38))
Royal Burghs Act 1633 (repealed)	1633 c. 24; 1633 c. 24	28 June 1633
Ratificatioun of the priveledges of the frie Royall burrowes. (Repealed by Statute Law Revision (Scotland) Act 1906 (6 Edw. 7. c. 38))
Justices of Peace Act 1633 (repealed)	1633 c. 25; 1633 c. 25	28 June 1633
Ratificatioun of the actes maid in favours of the Justices of peace and thair constables and commissione to the lords of secreit counsall thairanent. (Repealed by Statute Law Revision (Scotland) Act 1906 (6 Edw. 7. c. 38))
Lords of Session Act 1633 (repealed)	1633 c. 26; 1633 c. 26	28 June 1633
Explanation of the actes of parliament maid in favours of the Lords of Sessione Anent tuelff pennies of the pund to be payit in decreits to be given by the saids Lords heireftir. (Repealed by Statute Law Revision (Scotland) Act 1906 (6 Edw. 7. c. 38))
Pardon Act 1633 (repealed)	1633 c. 27; 1633 c. 27	28 June 1633
Act anent pardon of penall Statuites. (Repealed by Statute Law Revision (Scotland) Act 1906 (6 Edw. 7. c. 38))
Not public and general	1633 c. 28 — (Note: This act is not listed in the Duodecimal Edition.)	28 June 1633
Ratificatioun in favours of the vicount of Sterling of the infeftments and signatur grantit to him of the dominiones of New Scotland and Canada in America and pri veledges thairin contenit And of the dig nitie and order of knicht baronets and Act of conventione of estaits maid thairanent.
Not public and general	1633 c. 29 —	28 June 1633
Act in favour of Williame Earle of Mortoun and the lord Dalkeith his sone anent the loche of Levin and preservatione of the fishings thairof.
Clan Gregor Act 1633Not public and general	1633 c. 30 —	28 June 1633
Act anent the Clangregour.
Saving the Rights Act 1633 Not public and general	1633 c. 31 —	28 June 1633
Act in favour of his Majestie and lieges intitulat salvo jure cujuslibet.
Commission for Surveying Laws Act 1633 (repealed)	1633 c. 32 —	28 June 1633
Commissioun for Surveying the laws. (Repealed by Statute Law Revision (Scotland) Act 1906 (6 Edw. 7. c. 38))
Commission anent Admiralty Act 1633 (repealed)	1633 c. 33 —	28 June 1633
Commissioun anent the Admiralitie and chamberlanrie. (Repealed by Statute Law Revision (Scotland) Act 1906 (6 Edw. 7. c. 38))
Commission to Privy Council Act 1633 (repealed)	1633 c. 34 —	28 June 1633
Commissioun to the Lords of Secreit Counsell. (Repealed by Statute Law Revision (Scotland) Act 1906 (6 Edw. 7. c. 38))
Commission to Privy Council (No. 2) Act 1633 (repealed)	1633 c. 35 —	28 June 1633
Commissioun to the Lordis of Privie Counsall. (Repealed by Statute Law Revision (Scotland) Act 1906 (6 Edw. 7. c. 38))
Not public and general	1633 c. 36 —	28 June 1633
Commissioun anent John lord Torphichen.
Not public and general	1633 c. 37 —	28 June 1633
Commissioun anent Alexander lord Spynie.
Commission as to Exchange Act 1633 (repealed)	1633 c. 38 —	28 June 1633
Commissioun anent the exchange of moneyes. (Repealed by Statute Law Revision (Scotland) Act 1906 (6 Edw. 7. c. 38))
Commission as to Criminal Procedure Act 1633 (repealed)	1633 c. 39 —	28 June 1633
Commissioun anent the criminal judicatorie. (Repealed by Statute Law Revision (Scotland) Act 1906 (6 Edw. 7. c. 38))
Not public and general	1633 c. 40 —	28 June 1633
Commissioun anent the disjoining of Meikle and litle Daltounes fra Mowswald &c.
Commission to Exchequer Act 1633 (repealed)	1633 c. 41 —	28 June 1633
Commissioun to the Lordes of his Majesties Exchecker. (Repealed by Statute Law Revision (Scotland) Act 1906 (6 Edw. 7. c. 38))
Commission to Privy Council (No. 3) Act 1633 (repealed)	1633 c. 42 —	28 June 1633
Commissioun to the Lords of Secreit Counsall. (Repealed by Statute Law Revision (Scotland) Act 1906 (6 Edw. 7. c. 38))
Not public and general	1633 c. 43 —	28 June 1633
Commissioun anent the kirkes of Nisbett and Crailing.
Not public and general	1633 c. 44 —	28 June 1633
Act of dissolutione of the abbacies of Holyrudhous and Newabbay.
Not public and general	1633 c. 45 —	28 June 1633
Act of Rehabilitatione of Francis Stewart with the provisiones thairin contenit.
Not public and general	1633 c. 46 —	28 June 1633
Act in favours of the Earles of Roxburgh and Buckcleuch.
Not public and general	1633 c. 47 —	28 June 1633
Act in favours of maister Robert Craige.
Not public and general	1633 c. 48 —	28 June 1633
Act in favour of Williame Douglas of Cavers.
Not public and general	1633 c. 49 —	28 June 1633
Act of Naturalizatione of certane noblemen and gentlemen of England.
Not public and general	1633 c. 50 —	28 June 1633
Act in favour of George earle of Kinnowll Chancellor.
Not public and general	1633 c. 51 —	28 June 1633
Act in favour of James Duke of Lennox.
Not public and general	1633 c. 52 —	28 June 1633
Act in favour of James marques of Hamiltoun.
Not public and general	1633 c. 53 —	28 June 1633
Act in favour of James marques of Hamiltoun.
Not public and general	1633 c. 54 —	28 June 1633
Act in favour of Johne earle of Sutherland.
Not public and general	1633 c. 55 —	28 June 1633
Act in favour of William earle Marshall Lord Keith &c.
Not public and general	1633 c. 56 —	28 June 1633
Act in favour of James earle of Buchane.
Not public and general	1633 c. 57 —	28 June 1633
Act in favour of James earle of Buchane.
Not public and general	1633 c. 58 —	28 June 1633
Act in favour of Alexander earle of Galloway.
Not public and general	1633 c. 59 —	28 June 1633
Act in favour of Alexander lord Gairleis.
Not public and general	1633 c. 60 —	28 June 1633
Act in favours of John earle of Annandaill.
Not public and general	1633 c. 61 —	28 June 1633
Act in favours of John earle of Annandaill.
Not public and general	1633 c. 62 —	28 June 1633
Act in favoures of Patrick archibischop of Glasgow.
Not public and general	1633 c. 63 —	28 June 1633
Act in favour of Johne bischope of Rosse.
Not public and general	1633 c. 64 —	28 June 1633
Act in favoures of Andro bischope of Galloway.
Not public and general	1633 c. 65 —	28 June 1633
Act in favours of the Bischope of Dumblane.
Not public and general	1633 c. 66 —	28 June 1633
Act in favour of the Universitie of Sanct Andrewes.
Not public and general	1633 c. 67 —	28 June 1633
Act in favour of the Kings colledge of Aberdeine.
Not public and general	1633 c. 68 —	28 June 1633
Act in favour of the colledge of Glasgow.
Not public and general	1633 c. 69 —	28 June 1633
Act in favour of Archibald lord Lorne.
Not public and general	1633 c. 70 —	28 June 1633
Act in favour of Archibald lord of Lorne.
Not public and general	1633 c. 71 —	28 June 1633
Act in favour of Archibald lord of Lorne.
Not public and general	1633 c. 72 —	28 June 1633
Act in favours of Archibald lord of Lorne.
Not public and general	1633 c. 73 —	28 June 1633
Act in favours of John lord Yester.
Not public and general	1633 c. 74 —	28 June 1633
Act in favour of John lord of Lowdoun.
Not public and general	1633 c. 75 —	28 June 1633
Act in favour of John lord of Lowdoun.
Not public and general	1633 c. 76 —	28 June 1633
Act in favour of Archibald lord Napeir.
Not public and general	1633 c. 77 —	28 June 1633
Act in favour of John lord Lindesay.
Not public and general	1633 c. 78 —	28 June 1633
Act in favour of the burgh of Abirdeine.
Not public and general	1633 c. 79 —	28 June 1633
Act in favour of the burgh of Glasgow.
Not public and general	1633 c. 80 —	28 June 1633
Act in favour of the burgh of Culrois.
Not public and general	1633 c. 81 —	28 June 1633
Act in favour of the burgh of Hadingtoun.
Not public and general	1633 c. 82 —	28 June 1633
Act in favour of the burgh of Bruntiland.
Not public and general	1633 c. 83 —	28 June 1633
Act in favour of the burgh of Bamffe.
Not public and general	1633 c. 84 —	28 June 1633
Act in favour of the burgh of Pittinweyme.
Not public and general	1633 c. 85 —	28 June 1633
Act in favour of the burgh of Selkirk.
Not public and general	1633 c. 86 —	28 June 1633
Act in favour of the burgh of Air.
Not public and general	1633 c. 87 —	28 June 1633
Act in favour of the burgh of Invernes.
Not public and general	1633 c. 88 —	28 June 1633
Act in favour of the burgh of Carraill.
Not public and general	1633 c. 89 —	28 June 1633
Act in favour of the burgh of Kinghorne.
Not public and general	1633 c. 90 —	28 June 1633
Act in favour of the burgh of Dumbartane.
Not public and general	1633 c. 91 —	28 June 1633
Act in favour of the burgh of New Galloway.
Not public and general	1633 c. 92 —	28 June 1633
Act in favour of the burgh of Lawder.
Not public and general	1633 c. 93 —	28 June 1633
Act in favour of Sir Robert Dowglas of Spott.
Not public and general	1633 c. 94 —	28 June 1633
Act in favour of Sir Williame Anstruther.
Not public and general	1633 c. 95 —	28 June 1633
Act in favour of Patrick Maull of Panmure.
Not public and general	1633 c. 96 —	28 June 1633
Act in favour of James Livingstoun of Beill.
Not public and general	1633 c. 97 —	28 June 1633
Act in favour of James Maxwell of Innerweik.
Not public and general	1633 c. 98 —	28 June 1633
Act in favour of the said James Maxwell and Elizabeth de Bousie his spous.
Not public and general	1633 c. 99 —	28 June 1633
Act in favour of the airs of Maister Patrick Murray.
Not public and general	1633 c. 100 —	28 June 1633
Act in favour of William Murray.
Not public and general	1633 c. 101 —	28 June 1633
Act in favour of Sir Thomas Hope Craighall knicht baronett.
Not public and general	1633 c. 102 —	28 June 1633
Act in favour of Sir James Lokhart younger of Ley.
Not public and general	1633 c. 103 —	28 June 1633
Act in favour of the said Sir James Lokhart.
Not public and general	1633 c. 104 —	28 June 1633
Act in favour of Sir Johne Dalmahoy of that Ilk knicht.
Not public and general	1633 c. 105 —	28 June 1633
Act in favour of Sir Johne Dalmahoy of that Ilk knicht.
Not public and general	1633 c. 106 —	28 June 1633
Act in favour of Sir Coleine Campbell of Glenurquhy.
Not public and general	1633 c. 107 —	28 June 1633
Act in favour of Doctor Beatone and his spous.
Not public and general	1633 c. 108 —	28 June 1633
Act in favour of Henrie Nisbett.
Not public and general	1633 c. 109 —	28 June 1633
Act in favour of Johnne Oliphant of Bachiltoun.
Not public and general	1633 c. 110 —	28 June 1633
Act in favour of Sir James Makgill of Cranstounriddell knicht barronett.
Not public and general	1633 c. 111 —	28 June 1633
Act in favour of Sir Thomas Thomsone of Dudingstoun knicht.
Not public and general	1633 c. 112 —	28 June 1633
Act in favour of Maister Alexander Swintoune of that Ilk.
Not public and general	1633 c. 113 —	28 June 1633
Act in favour of Maister Walter Quhytfuird.
Not public and general	1633 c. 114 —	28 June 1633
Act in favour of Maister Walter Quhytfurd.
Not public and general	1633 c. 115 —	28 June 1633
Act in favour of the laird of Philorth younger.
Not public and general	1633 c. 116 —	28 June 1633
Act in favour of Alexander Cuninghame of Corshill.
Not public and general	1633 c. 117 —	28 June 1633
Act in favour of Maister James Bannatyne of Newhall.
Not public and general	1633 c. 118 —	28 June 1633
Act in favour of Maister Andro Ayttoune of Logy advocate.
Not public and general	1633 c. 119 —	28 June 1633
Act in favour of Sir James Hamiltoune of Priestfield.
Not public and general	1633 c. 120 —	28 June 1633
Act in favour of Johne Campbell fear of Calder.
Not public and general	1633 c. 121 —	28 June 1633
Act in favour of Sir Johne Spottiswod of Dairsie.
Not public and general	1633 c. 122 —	28 June 1633
Act in favour of Alexander Forbes of Pitsligo.
Not public and general	1633 c. 123 —	28 June 1633
Act in favour of David Lindsay of Edzell.
Not public and general	1633 c. 124 —	28 June 1633
Act in favour of M_{r} James Sydserff of Rouchlaw.
Not public and general	1633 c. 125 —	28 June 1633
Act in favour of Johne Sinklar of Stevinsone.
Not public and general	1633 c. 126 —	28 June 1633
Act in favour of Thomas Crombie of Kemno.
Not public and general	1633 c. 127 —	28 June 1633
Act in favour of Sir Patrick Macgie of Larg knicht.
Not public and general	1633 c. 128 —	28 June 1633
Act in favour of the ministers of Portpatrick.
Not public and general	1633 c. 129 —	28 June 1633
Act in favour of Sir Arthur Dowglas of Quhittinghame.
Not public and general	1633 c. 130 —	28 June 1633
Act in favour of Maister Williame Drummond.
Not public and general	1633 c. 131 —	28 June 1633
Act in favour of the skinners of Edinburgh.
Not public and general	1633 c. 132 —	28 June 1633
Act in favour of Mr James Nicolsone of Colbrandspeth.
Not public and general	1633 c. 133 —	28 June 1633
Act in favour of the fewars of Inverask.
Not public and general	1633 c. 134 —	28 June 1633
Act in favour of James Scott of Gallowscheills.
Not public and general	1633 c. 135 —	28 June 1633
Act in favour of John Birsbane of Bischoptoun.
Not public and general	1633 c. 136 —	28 June 1633
Act in favour of Maister Williame Cuninghame of Brownhill.
Not public and general	1633 c. 137 —	28 June 1633
Act in favour of Maister James Raith of Edmistoun.
Not public and general	1633 c. 138 —	28 June 1633
Act in favour of Edward Maxwell of Tinwald.
Not public and general	1633 c. 139 —	28 June 1633
Act in favour of Johne Erskeine of Balhagardie.
Not public and general	1633 c. 140 —	28 June 1633
Act in favour of Lauchlane Makclauchlan of that Ilk.
Not public and general	1633 c. 141 —	28 June 1633
Act in favour of the kirk of Pittinweyme.
Not public and general	1633 c. 142 —	28 June 1633
Act in favour of the kirk of Eymouth.
Not public and general	1633 c. 143 —	28 June 1633
Act in favour of the minister of Coldinghame.
Not public and general	1633 c. 144 —	28 June 1633
Act in favour of the minister of Bruntiland.
Not public and general	1633 c. 145 —	28 June 1633
Act of dissolutioun of Lugtoun and Melvill frome the paroche of S^{t} androis. And vnioun thairof to Dalkeith and Laswade.
Not public and general	1633 c. 146 —	28 June 1633
Act anent the personage of Dalkeith and payment of the taxatione thairof.
Not public and general	1633 c. 147 —	28 June 1633
Act in favour of Sir Richard Murray of Cokpull.
Not public and general	1633 c. 148 —	28 June 1633
Act in favour of the minister of Colbrandspeth.
Not public and general	1633 c. 149 —	28 June 1633
Act in favour of Sir Johne Charters of Aimesfield.
Not public and general	1633 c. 150 —	28 June 1633
Act in favour of Sir Patrick Hamiltoun of Litle Prestoun.
Not public and general	1633 c. 151 —	28 June 1633
Act in favour of M^{r} Andro Murray of Balvaird.
Not public and general	1633 c. 152 —	28 June 1633
Act in favour of Johne Hamiltoun of Boghall and Heleine Home his spous.
Not public and general	1633 c. 153 —	28 June 1633
Act in favour of Williame Lokhart of Carstairs.
Not public and general	1633 c. 154 —	28 June 1633
Act in favour of Maister Robert Gordoun of Strealoch.
Not public and general	1633 c. 155 —	28 June 1633
Act disuniting the kirkes of Ebdie and Newburgh.
Not public and general	1633 c. 156 —	28 June 1633
Act anent the paroche kirk of Strechine.
Not public and general	1633 c. 157 —	28 June 1633
Act in favour of Sir George Hamiltoun.
Not public and general	1633 c. 158 —	28 June 1633
Act uniting certane lands to the kirkes of Corstorphine and Haills.
Not public and general	1633 c. 159 —	28 June 1633
Act in favour of James Hay of Smithfield.
Not public and general	1633 c. 160 —	28 June 1633
Act in favour of Sir James Balfour of Kinnaird knicht.
Not public and general	1633 c. 161 —	28 June 1633
Act in favour of Alexander Cunynghame of Barnes.
Not public and general	1633 c. 162 —	28 June 1633
Act in favour of Alexander Maister of Elphingstoun.
Not public and general	1633 c. 163 —	28 June 1633
Act in favour of Maister Alexander Keith of Benholme.
Not public and general	1633 c. 164 —	28 June 1633
Act dissolving four prebendaries frome the paroche kirk of Corstorphine to the colledge kirk thairof.
Not public and general	1633 c. 165 —	28 June 1633
Act in favour of Sir Johne Achmootie of Gosfuird.
Not public and general	1633 c. 166 —	28 June 1633
Act in favour of Sir George Ogilvie of Bamffe.
Not public and general	1633 c. 167 —	28 June 1633
Act in favour of Sir Thomas Hope of Craighall knicht.
Not public and general	1633 c. 168 —	28 June 1633
Act anent the reedifieing of the kirk of Beythe.

=== Sources ===
- Alexander, William (1841). "Acta Parliamentorum Regis Caroli Primi". An Abridgement of the Acts of the Parliaments of Scotland. Edinburgh: Adam and Charles Black. pp. A45 – A48 – via Google Books.
- Alexander, William (1841). "Acta Parliamentorum Regis Caroli Primi". An Abridgement of the Acts of the Parliaments of Scotland. Edinburgh: Adam and Charles Black. pp. A45 – A48 – via Google Books.
- Chronological Table of the Statutes. London: Her Majesty's Stationery Office. 1972. p. 1349 – via Google Books.
- "Acts of the Old Scottish Parliament: 1633". legislation.gov.uk. The National Archives.
- "Index of Statutes: Index of Statutes: Charles I (1625-1649)". Records of the Parliaments of Scotland to 1707. University of St Andrews.

== See also ==
- List of legislation in the United Kingdom
- Records of the Parliaments of Scotland
