= List of acts of the Parliament of Scotland from 1686 =

This is a list of acts of the Parliament of Scotland for the year 1686.

It lists acts of Parliament of the old Parliament of Scotland, that was merged with the old Parliament of England to form the Parliament of Great Britain, by the Union with England Act 1707 (c. 7).

For other years, see list of acts of the Parliament of Scotland. For the period after 1707, see list of acts of the Parliament of Great Britain.

== 1686 ==
The 2nd session of the parliament of James VII, which met in Edinburgh from 29 April 1659.

Short title, or popular name	Citation	Royal assent
Long title
Dissolution Act 1686 (repealed)	1686 c. 1 (Note: This is the citation in the Record Edition.); 1686 c. 1 (Note: This is the citation in the Duodecimal Edition.)	18 May 1686
Act of Dissolution of the lands of Cessnock and Duchall from the Crown in favours of John Viscount of Melfort. (Note: John Drummond, 1st Earl of Melfort.); Act of Dissolution of the lands of Cessnock and Duchal from the Crown, in favour of John, Viscount of Melfort. (Repealed by Statute Law Repeal (No. 3) Act 1690 (c. 58))
Not public and general	1686 c. 2 — (Note: This act is not listed in the Duodecimal Edition.)	24 May 1686
Act of Dissolution of the Lands and Estate of Ochiltrie from the Crown in favours of William Cochrane. Act of Dissolution of the Lands and Estate of Ochiltree from the Crown in favour of William Cochrane.
Supply Act 1686 (repealed)	1686 c. 3; 1686 c. 2	24 May 1686
Act for the better inbringing of his Majesties Supply. Act for the better bringing-in of his Majesty's Supply. (Repealed by Statute Law Revision (Scotland) Act 1906 (6 Edw. 7. c. 38))
Interlocutors Act 1686	1686 c. 4; 1686 c. 3	24 May 1686
Act ordaining Interlocutors to be subscribed by the Judges. Act ordaining Interlocutors to be subscribed by the Judges.
Citation Act 1686 still in force	1686 c. 5; 1686 c. 4	24 May 1686
Act ordaining all executions to be subscrived by the witnesses without necessity of stamping. Act ordaining all executions to be subscribed by the witnesses without necessity of stamping.
Court of Session Act 1686 (repealed)	1686 c. 6; 1686 c. 5	24 May 1686
Act appoynting the dyets of the Session. Act appointing the dates of the Session. (Repealed by Statute Law Revision (Scotland) Act 1906 (6 Edw. 7. c. 38))
Yule Vacance Act 1686 (repealed)	1686 c. 7; 1686 c. 6	24 May 1686
Act for the Christmas Vacance. Act for the Christmas Vacation. (Repealed by Statute Law Repeal (No. 3) Act 1690 (c. 58))
Dissolution (No. 2) Act 1686 (repealed)	1686 c. 8; 1686 c. 26	24 May 1686
Act dissolving the Lands and Estates of Earlestoun Craichlaw and Caitloch from the Croun in favours of Sir Theophilus Ogilthorp. Act dissolving the Lands and Estates of Earlston, Craichlaw and Caitloch from the Crown in favour of Sir Theophilus Ogilthorp. (Repealed by Statute Law Repeal (No. 3) Act 1690 (c. 58))
Not public and general	1686 c. 9 —	24 May 1686
Act for rebuilding the bridge of Ugie with stone and lyme. Act for rebuilding the bridge of Ugie with stone and lime.
Supply (No. 2) Act 1686 (repealed)	1686 c. 10 —	28 May 1686
Act adding Commissioners for supply for the shyres of Air Dumbartoun and Caithness. (Repealed by Statute Law Revision (Scotland) Act 1906 (6 Edw. 7. c. 38))
Dissolution (No. 3) Act 1686 (repealed)	1686 c. 11; 1686 c. 7	28 May 1686
Act of Dissolution of the lands and barrony of Torwoodlie from the Crown in favors of Lieutenent Generall Drummond. (Repealed by Statute Law Repeal (No. 3) Act 1690 (c. 58))
Dissolution (No. 4) Act 1686 (repealed)	1686 c. 12; 1686 c. 27	28 May 1686
Act of Dissolution of the Lands of Grange from the Crown in favors of Sir Thomas Kennedy Lord Provost of Edinburgh. Act of Dissolution of the Lands of Grange from the Crown in favour of Sir Thomas Kennedy, Lord Provost of Edinburgh. (Repealed by Statute Law Repeal (No. 3) Act 1690 (c. 58))
Highways and Bridges Act 1686 (repealed)	1686 c. 13; 1686 c. 8	28 May 1686
Additional Act anent High-ways and Bridges. Additional Act about Highways and Bridges. (Repealed by Statute Law Revision (Scotland) Act 1906 (6 Edw. 7. c. 38))
Supply (No. 3) Act 1686 (repealed)	1686 c. 14 —	4 June 1686
Act adding Commissioners of Supply in the Shyres of Fyffe and Perth. (Repealed by Statute Law Revision (Scotland) Act 1906 (6 Edw. 7. c. 38))
Not public and general	1686 c. 15 —	4 June 1686
Act in favors of Sir Alexander Gibson one of the Clerks of Session anent the changing of a Highway.
Dissolution (No. 5) Act 1686 (repealed)	1686 c. 16 —	8 June 1686
Act dissolving from the Croun forfaulted lands which held of other Superiors than the King. (Repealed by Statute Law Revision (Scotland) Act 1906 (6 Edw. 7. c. 38))
Annexation Act 1686 (repealed)	1686 c. 17; 1686 c. 9	8 June 1686
Act of Annexation of the Barronies of Muirhall and Melfort to the Croun. (Repealed by Statute Law Repeal (No. 3) Act 1690 (c. 58))
Not public and general	1686 c. 18 —	8 June 1686
Act in favors of the Duches of Hamiltoun anent the office of Justice Generall in the Isle of Arran.
Dissolution (No. 6) Act 1686 (repealed)	1686 c. 19; 1686 c. 13	8 June 1686
Act of Dissolution of the lands and barony of Mellerstanes from the Crown in favors of George Duke of Gordon. (Repealed by Statute Law Repeal (No. 3) Act 1690 (c. 58))
Not public and general	1686 c. 20; 1686 c. 10	8 June 1686
Act ordaining pursuers to furnish the to the defenders whereon they are to depone. (Repealed by Statute Law Revision (Scotland) Act 1906 (6 Edw. 7. c. 38))
Winter Herding Act 1686 (repealed)	1686 c. 21; 1686 c. 11	8 June 1686
Act for Winter herding. (Repealed by Animals (Scotland) Act 1987 (c. 9))
Not public and general	1686 c. 22; 1686 c. 12	8 June 1686
Act for cleansing the Streets of Edinburgh.
Supply (No. 4) Act 1686 (repealed)	1686 c. 23 —	14 June 1686
Act appointing the Earl of Murray and Lord Doun Conveeners of the Commissioners of Supply in the shyre of Inverness. (Repealed by Statute Law Revision (Scotland) Act 1906 (6 Edw. 7. c. 38))
Dissolution (No. 7) Act 1686 (repealed)	1686 c. 24; 1686 c. 28	14 June 1686
Act of Dissolution of the Lands of Cult ness Northberwick and Goodtries from the Crown in favors of James Earle of Arran. (Repealed by Statute Law Repeal (No. 3) Act 1690 (c. 58))
Not public and general	1686 c. 25; 1686 c. 29	14 June 1686
Act and Dissolution of the lands of Ro berton &c. from the Crown in favors of Walter late Earle of Tarras.
Irish Victual and Cattle Act 1686 (repealed)	1686 c. 26; 1686 c. 14	14 June 1686
Act prohibiting the importing of Irish Victuall and Cattle. (Repealed by Statute Law Revision (Scotland) Act 1906 (6 Edw. 7. c. 38))
Inhibitions Act 1686 (repealed)	1686 c. 27; 1686 c. 15	14 June 1686
Act declareing that Inhibitions shall not be prejudged by Recognition. (Repealed by Statute Law Revision (Scotland) Act 1906 (6 Edw. 7. c. 38))
Linen Act 1686 (repealed)	1686 c. 28; 1686 c. 16	14 June 1686
Act for burying in Scotts Linnen. (Repealed by Statute Law Revision (Scotland) Act 1906 (6 Edw. 7. c. 38))
Sasines Act 1686 (repealed)	1686 c. 29; 1686 c. 17	14 June 1686
Act for writeing Sasines be way of book. (Repealed by Statute Law Revision (Scotland) Act 1964 (c. 80))
Evidence Act 1686 still in force	1686 c. 30; 1686 c. 18	14 June 1686
Act appoynting the Publication of the testimonies of witnesses.
Regulation of Judicatories Act 1686 (repealed)	1686 c. 31; 1686 c. 23	14 June 1686
Commission for Regulation of Judicatories. (Repealed by Statute Law Revision (Scotland) Act 1906 (6 Edw. 7. c. 38))
Prohibited Imports Act 1686 (repealed)	1686 c. 32 —	14 June 1686
Act of Reference to the Councill anent allowing importatione of prohibited goods. (Repealed by Statute Law Revision (Scotland) Act 1906 (6 Edw. 7. c. 38))
Registration of Sasines Act 1686 (repealed)	1686 c. 33; 1686 c. 19	14 June 1686
Act anent the Registration of Sasines and Reversions. (Repealed by Statute Law Revision (Scotland) Act 1964 (c. 80))
Teind Commission Act 1686 (repealed)	1686 c. 34; 1686 c. 22	14 June 1686
Act and Commission for plantation of Kirks and Valuation of Teynds. (Repealed by Statute Law Revision (Scotland) Act 1964 (c. 80))
Clerk to Justices of Peace Act 1686 (repealed)	1686 c. 35; 1686 c. 20	14 June 1686
Act anent the nomination of the Clerk to the Justices of Peace. (Repealed by Statute Law Revision (Scotland) Act 1906 (6 Edw. 7. c. 38))
Statute Law Repeal Act 1686 (repealed)	1686 c. 36; 1686 c. 23	14 June 1686
Act rescinding ane former act annexing Lands in Ross-shyre to Cromarty. (Repealed by Confession of Faith Ratification Act 1690 (c. 7) and Statute Law Repeal (No. 3) Act 1690 (c. 58))
Not public and general	1686 c. 37; 1686 c. 21	14 June 1686
Act in favors of John Adair Geographer for surveying the Kingdome of Scotland and navigating the Coasts and Isles thereof.
Supply (No. 5) Act 1686 (repealed)	1686 c. 38; 1686 c. 24	14 June 1686
Act anent ane humble offer to his Majesty for ane imposition upon certain commodities for defraying the expence of a free Coynage and other matters relating to the Mint. (Repealed by Statute Law Revision (Scotland) Act 1906 (6 Edw. 7. c. 38))
Argyle Act 1686 (repealed)	1686 c. 39 —	15 June 1686
Act rescinding a Commission granted anent the Estate of Argyle. (Repealed by Statute Law Revision (Scotland) Act 1906 (6 Edw. 7. c. 38))
Earl of Argyle Act 1686 (repealed)	1686 c. 40; 1686 c. 25	15 June 1686
Act rescinding a Clause in the Address made by the Parliament against the late Earle of Argyle. (Repealed by Statute Law Revision (Scotland) Act 1906 (6 Edw. 7. c. 38))
Bark Act 1686 (repealed)	1686 c. 41; 1686 c. 30	15 June 1686
Act anent the Measure of Bark. (Repealed by Statute Law Revision (Scotland) Act 1906 (6 Edw. 7. c. 38))
Records Act 1686 (repealed)	1686 c. 42 —	15 June 1686
Act rescinding ane act Entituled "Act for Security of the Records." (Note: Records Act 1685 (c. 39)) (Repealed by Statute Law Revision (Scotland) Act 1906 (6 Edw. 7. c. 38))
Not public and general	1686 c. 43; 1686 c. 31	15 June 1686
Act in favors of John Meikle founder.
Not public and general	1686 c. 44 —	15 June 1686
Act in favors of Mr Walter Birnie preacher.
Not public and general	1686 c. 45 —	15 June 1686
Act in favors of Robert Cuningham of Auchinhervie for uplifting an imposition on beer and aile for building ane harbour at Saltcoats.
Not public and general	1686 c. 46 —	15 June 1686
Act in favors of George Duke of Gordoun for building a bridge on the water of Bogy.
Supply (No. 6) Act 1686 (repealed)	1686 c. 47 —	15 June 1686
Act adding Commissioners for Supply in the Shyres of Edinburgh Forfar Selkirk Kincardin Roxburgh Peebles Berwick and the Stewartry of Kircudbright. (Repealed by Statute Law Revision (Scotland) Act 1906 (6 Edw. 7. c. 38))
Macers of Parliament Act 1686 (repealed)	1686 c. 48 —	15 June 1686
Act in favors of the Sex Macers of Parliament. Act in favour of the Six Macers of Parliament. (Repealed by Statute Law Revision (Scotland) Act 1906 (6 Edw. 7. c. 38))
Not public and general	1686 c. 49 —	15 June 1686
Warrand for a Bore Brieve to Charles Colbert Marques of Seignelay. (Note: Jean Baptiste Colbert, Marquis of Seignelay.); Warrant for a Bore Brieve to Charles Colbert, Marquis of Seignelay.
Not public and general	1686 c. 50 —	15 June 1686
Ratification in favors of George Duke of Gordone (Note: George Gordon, 1st Duke of Gordon.) of the Lands of Lochzeall &c. Ratification in favour of George, Duke of Gordon, of the Lands of Lochiel, etc.
Not public and general	1686 c. 51 —	15 June 1686
Ratification in favors of James Earle of Perth Lord High Chancellor of the Lands of Campbell Dollar &c.
Not public and general	1686 c. 52 —	15 June 1686
Ratification in favors of Anna Dutches of Buccleugh of the Lands and Barrony of Hawick &c.
Not public and general	1686 c. 53 —	15 June 1686
Ratification in favors of Anna Dutches of Buccleugh disjoyning the five paroches of Eskdaill from the shyre of Dumfreis and annexing the same to the shyre of Roxburgh.
Not public and general	1686 c. 54 —	15 June 1686
Ratification in favors of Charles Earle of Midletoune of the Lands and Barony of Wattirsyde &c.
Not public and general	1686 c. 55 —	15 June 1686
Ratification in favors of George Earle of Dumbartan of the lands & barony of Saltoun &c.
Not public and general	1686 c. 56 —	15 June 1686
Ratification in favors of John Viscount of Melfort of the lands & barony of Lundin &c.
Not public and general	1686 c. 57 —	15 June 1686
Ratification in favors of John Viscount of Melfort of the lands & barronie of Riccartoun and Cessnock and others Of ane Signature past his Majesties Royall hand.
Not public and general	1686 c. 58 —	15 June 1686
Ratification in favors of George Viscount of Tarbat of the Regality of Tarbat.
Not public and general	1686 c. 59 —	15 June 1686
Ratification in favours of Generall Drummond of the lands and barrony of Torwoodlie of ane signature past his Majesties Royal hand.
Not public and general	1686 c. 60 —	15 June 1686
Ratification in favours of David Ross of Balnagoun of the lands and barony of Balnagoun &c.
Not public and general	1686 c. 61 —	15 June 1686
Ratification in favors of Sir James Stewart of Boote of the lands and barony of Barbreck &c.
Not public and general	1686 c. 62 —	15 June 1686
Ratification in favors of Sir Colline Campbell of Aberuchill of the lands and barony of Aberuchill &c.
Not public and general	1686 c. 63 —	15 June 1686
Ratification in favors of Sir Archibald Cockburn younger of Langtoun of the lands and barony of Langtoun &c.
Not public and general	1686 c. 64 —	15 June 1686
Ratification in favors of Sir Thomas Kennedy Lord Provost of Edinburgh of the lands of Grange &c.
Not public and general	1686 c. 65 —	15 June 1686
Ratification in favors of Sir Charles Stewart and Sir William Ker of their gift of the office of Directorship of His Majesties Chancellary.
Not public and general	1686 c. 66 —	15 June 1686
Ratification in favors of Sir John Gordon advocat of the Lands of Humetoun &c.
Not public and general	1686 c. 67 —	15 June 1686
Ratification in favors of Hew MacLeod of Cambuscurry of the lands of Cambuscurry &c.
Not public and general	1686 c. 68 —	15 June 1686
Ratification in favors of John Reid of Barach of the lands and barony of Barach.
Not public and general	1686 c. 69 —	15 June 1686
Ratification in favors of George Keith of Meikle Creighie of the lands of Creighie &c.
Not public and general	1686 c. 70 —	15 June 1686
Ratification in favors of James Urquhart of Knockleith of the lands of Hill & others.
Not public and general	1686 c. 71 —	15 June 1686
Ratification in favors of Lady Mary Bruce and William Cochran of the lands and barony of Ochiltrie &c.
Not public and general	1686 c. 72 —	15 June 1686
Ratification in favors of James Caddell of Muirtoun of ane Chartor under the great Seale of the Lands of Tulloch Blairie and others contained in ane chartor.
Not public and general	1686 c. 73 —	15 June 1686
Ratification of ane act of Privy Council for Repairing the Cathedrall Kirk of Dornock.
Not public and general	1686 c. 74 —	15 June 1686
Ratification of the lands and barony of Balcomy in favors of Mr William Gordoun advocat of ane Chartor under the great Seale.
Not public and general	1686 c. 75 —	15 June 1686
Ratification of the Lands and Barrony of Invernytie of ane Signature bearing a Change of holding in favors of the Laird of Invernytie.
Not public and general	1686 c. 76 —	15 June 1686
Ratification of the Decreets of forfaulture against John Lockhart of Bankheid M^{r} Mathew Campbell of Watterhugh and others contained in the said decreet of forfaulture and of ane gift and chartor of the same by his Majesties umquhill dearest brother of ever blissed memory in favors of Sir W^{m} Sharpe of Scotscraig his airs and assigneys whatsomever.
Not public and general	1686 c. 77 —	15 June 1686
Ratification in favors of Robert Milne his Majesties Master Masson of ane Act of the Toun Council of Edinburgh and Ratification of his Majesties secret Council thairof anent the building of brunt and ruinous houses within the burgh of Edinburgh and gadge made conforme thairto of the great stone land at the head of Dicksones Close.
Not public and general	1686 c. 78 —	15 June 1686
Ratification of the lands and barrony of Ottar in favors of M^{r} Alex_{r} M^{c}Lean of Ottar proceeding upon the forfaulture of Alexander Campbell late of Ottar.
Not public and general	1686 c. 79 —	15 June 1686
Ratification in favors of Captain Edward Burd of ane act of his Majesties Privy Council for building a bridge upon the watter of Tyne and uplifting the customes thereof.
Not public and general	1686 c. 80 —	15 June 1686
Ratification in favours of Sr Thomas Stewart of Garntillie proceeding upon ane Signatour under his Majesties Royall hand of the lands and baronie of ... Ratification in favour of Sir Thomas Stewart of Grandtully, proceeding upon a signature under his Majesty's Royal hand of the lands and barony of Strathbraan.
Not public and general	1686 c. 81 —	15 June 1686
Warrand for the Marques of Douglass (Note: James Douglas, 2nd Marquess of Douglas.) for two yearly faires at Killimuire. Warrant for the Marquis of Douglas for two yearly fairs at Killiemuir.
Not public and general	1686 c. 82 —	15 June 1686
Warrand for George Rosse of Morinshaw for twa yearly fairs and a weekly mercat at Inuerbraikie.
Not public and general	1686 c. 83 —	15 June 1686
Warrand for Sir Collin Campbell of Abberuchill for four yearly faires.
Not public and general	1686 c. 84 —	15 June 1686
Warrand to the Laird of M^{c}intosh for seven free yearly fairs
Not public and general	1686 c. 85 —	15 June 1686
Warrand to the Earle of Bradalbine for six free faires yearly.
Not public and general	1686 c. 86 —	15 June 1686
Warrand for two yearly faires and a weekly mercat to [Robert] Dumbar of Grangehill.
Not public and general	1686 c. 87 —	15 June 1686
Warrand for Sir George Gordoun of Edinglassie for twa free yearly fairs and a weekly mercat at the toun of Carnoussie.
Not public and general	1686 c. 88 —	15 June 1686
Warrand for Patrick Earle of Strathmore for foure free faires in the year.
Not public and general	1686 (c. 89 —	15 June 1686
Warrand for Sir James Caddell of Muirtoun for one free fair yearly and a weekly mercat.
Not public and general	1686 c. 90 —	15 June 1686
Warrand to the Earle of Airley for two free faires in the year.
Not public and general	1686 c. 91 —	15 June 1686
Warrand for Lord Burley for two free fairs and a weekly mercat.
Not public and general	1686 c. 92 —	15 June 1686
Warrand for Lord Sinclair for a yearly fair and weekly mercat at the toun of Gallatoun in Fife.
Not public and general	1686 c. 93 —	15 June 1686
Warrand for Sir James Carnegie of Finheaven for two free faires yearly and a weekly mercat at the Kirktoun of Finheaven.
Not public and general	1686 c. 94 —	15 June 1686
Warrand for the Town of Dumfermling for twa free fairs yearly and a weekly mercat.
Not public and general	1686 c. 95 —	15 June 1686
Warrand for John Carruthers of Holdmaines for three free fairs yearly and a weekly mercat at Meikle Dalstoun.
Not public and general	1686 c. 96 —	15 June 1686
Warrand for W^{m} Leckies of Deshoars for three free fairs yearly with a weekly mercat at the Castlehill of Deshoars.
Not public and general	1686 c. 97 —	15 June 1686
Warrand for the Laird of Strechen for twa free fairs yearly with a weekly mercat at Strechen.
Not public and general	1686 c. 98 —	15 June 1686
Warrand for two frie faires in favoures of George Duke of Gordone to be holden yearly at Milestaines in the Merse the second Tuesday of July and the first Tuesday of October.
Not public and general	1686 c. 99 —	15 June 1686
Warrand in favors of George Duke of Gordon for thirteen free yearlie fairs and two weekly mercats.
Not public and general	1686 c. 100 —	15 June 1686
Warrand for two yearlie free fairs in favors of James Earle of Perth to be holden at the toune of Dollar the first upon the 2d Tuesday of June the other upon the 2d Tuesday of October with ane weekly mercat on Wednesday.
Not public and general	1686 c. 101 —	15 June 1686
Warrand for two yearly fairs in favors of the Viscount of Tarbat on the last Tuesday of October.
Saving the Rights Act 1686 Not public and general	1686 c. 102) [12mo ed: c. 32	15 June 1686
Act Salvo Jure Cujuslibet. Act Salvo Jure Cujuslibet.
Adjournment Act 1686 (repealed)	1686 c. 103; 1686 c. 33	15 June 1686
Act of Adjournment. Act of Adjournment. (Repealed by Statute Law Revision (Scotland) Act 1906 (6 Edw. 7. c. 38))

=== Sources ===
- Alexander, William (1841). "Acta Parliamentorum Regis Jacobi Septimi". An Abridgement of the Acts of the Parliaments of Scotland. Edinburgh: Adam and Charles Black. pp. A73 – A75 – via Google Books.
- Alexander, William (1841). "Acta Parliamentorum Regis Jacobi Septimi". An Abridgement of the Acts of the Parliaments of Scotland. Edinburgh: Adam and Charles Black. pp. A73 – A75 – via Google Books.
- Chronological Table of the Statutes. London: Her Majesty's Stationery Office. 1972. pp. 1358–1359 – via Google Books.
- "Acts of the Old Scottish Parliament: 1686". legislation.gov.uk. The National Archives.
- "Index of Statutes: Index of Statutes: James VII (1685-1688)". Records of the Parliaments of Scotland to 1707. University of St Andrews.

== See also ==
- List of legislation in the United Kingdom
- Records of the Parliaments of Scotland
