= List of acts of the Parliament of Scotland from 1606 =

This is a list of acts of the Parliament of Scotland for the year 1606.

It lists acts of Parliament of the old Parliament of Scotland, that was merged with the old Parliament of England to form the Parliament of Great Britain, by the Union with England Act 1707 (c. 7).

For other years, see list of acts of the Parliament of Scotland. For the period after 1707, see list of acts of the Parliament of Great Britain.

== 1606 ==
The 18th parliament of James VI, held in Edinburgh from 7 June 1605.

Short title, or popular name	Citation	Royal assent
Long title
Sovereignty Act 1606 still in force	1606 c. 1 (Note: This is the citation in the Record Edition.); 1606 c. 1 (Note: This is the citation in the Duodecimal Edition.)	11 July 1606
Act anent the kingis maiesteis prerogatiue. Act about the king's majesty's prerogative.
Bishops Act 1606 (repealed)	1606 c. 2; 1606 c. 2	11 July 1606
Act anent the restitutioun of the estate of bischoppis. Act about the restitution of the estate of bishops. (Repealed by Confession of Faith Ratification Act 1690 (c. 7))
Not public and general	1606 c. 3; 1606 c. 4	11 July 1606
Anent foirfaltit persones. About forfeit persons.
Tweed and Annan Act 1606 (repealed)	1606 c. 4; 1606 c. 5	11 July 1606
Act anent the riveris of Tweid and Annand. Act about the rivers of Tweed and Annan. (Repealed by Statute Law Revision (Scotland) Act 1906 (6 Edw. 7. c. 38))
Customs Act 1606 (repealed)	1606 c. 5; 1606 c. 6	11 July 1606
Anent the customes betuix Scotland and England. About the customs between Scotland and England. (Repealed by Statute Law Revision (Scotland) Act 1906 (6 Edw. 7. c. 38))
Glebes Act 1606 (repealed)	1606 c. 6; 1606 c. 7	11 July 1606
Anent glebis in pasturage and sowmes grass. (Repealed by Statute Law Revision (Scotland) Act 1964 (c. 80))
Teinds Act 1606 (repealed)	1606 c. 7; 1606 c. 8	11 July 1606
Anent teynding of cornes. (Repealed by Statute Law Revision (Scotland) Act 1906 (6 Edw. 7. c. 38))
Ejections and Spuilyies Act 1606 (repealed)	1606 c. 8; 1606 c. 9	11 July 1606
Anent auld decreittis of ejectioun and spulyie in the bordouris. (Repealed by Statute Law Revision (Scotland) Act 1906 (6 Edw. 7. c. 38))
Hornings Act 1606 (repealed)	1606 c. 9; 1606 c. 10	11 July 1606
Act anent directing of lettres of hornyng on schireffis stewartis and baillies decreittis. (Repealed by Statute Law Revision (Scotland) Act 1964 (c. 80))
Colliers and Salters Act 1606 (repealed)	1606 c. 10; 1606 c. 11	11 July 1606
Act Anent Coilyearis and Saltaris. Act about Colliers and Salters. (Repealed by Statute Law Revision (Scotland) Act 1906 (6 Edw. 7. c. 38))
Feuing of Wardlands Act 1606 (repealed)	1606 c. 11; 1606 c. 12	11 July 1606
Act anent setting of fewis be subvassellis of waird landis. (Repealed by Statute Law Revision (Scotland) Act 1906 (6 Edw. 7. c. 38))
Lint in Lochs Act 1606 (repealed)	1606 c. 12; 1606 c. 13	11 July 1606
Anent laying of lynt in lochis. About laying of lint in lochs. (Repealed by Statute Law Revision (Scotland) Act 1964 (c. 80))
Crown Vassal's Duties Act 1606 (repealed)	1606 c. 13; 1606 c. 14	11 July 1606
Act in favouris of his Majesteis vassellis for payment of thair blenshe dueties. (Repealed by Statute Law Revision (Scotland) Act 1906 (6 Edw. 7. c. 38))
Sasines Act 1606 (repealed)	1606 c. 14; 1606 c. 15	11 July 1606
Actanent saisingis to be gevin on preceptis of the chancellarie. (Repealed by Statute Law Revision (Scotland) Act 1906 (6 Edw. 7. c. 38))
Royal Burghs Act 1606 (repealed)	1606 c. 15; 1606 c. 16	11 July 1606
Act in favouris of the burrowis regall. Act in favour of the royal burghs. (Repealed by Statute Law Revision (Scotland) Act 1906 (6 Edw. 7. c. 38))
Royal Burghs (No. 2) Act 1606 (repealed)	1606 c. 16; 1606 c. 17	11 July 1606
Act for staying of all unlauchfull conventionis within burgh and for assisting of the magistrattis in the executioun of thair offices. (Repealed by Statute Law Revision (Scotland) Act 1964 (c. 80))
Royal Residences Act 1606 (repealed)	1606 c. 17 — (Note: This act is not listed in the Duodecimal Edition.)	11 July 1606
Anent the keiping of the Kingis houssis. About the keeping of the King's houses. (Repealed by Statute Law Revision (Scotland) Act 1906 (6 Edw. 7. c. 38))
Supply Act 1606 (repealed)	1606 c. 18 —	11 July 1606
Act anent the taxatioun and collecting thairof. Act about taxation and the collecting thereof. (Repealed by Statute Law Revision (Scotland) Act 1906 (6 Edw. 7. c. 38))
Supply (No. 2) Act 1606 (repealed)	1606 c. 19 —	11 July 1606
Act anent the granting of the taxatioun. Act about the granting of taxation. (Repealed by Statute Law Revision (Scotland) Act 1906 (6 Edw. 7. c. 38))
Not public and general	1606 c. 20 —	11 July 1606
Ratificatioun in favouris of the erle of Dun bar of the erldome of Dunbar and utheris landis.
Not public and general	1606 c. 21 —	11 July 1606
Ane acquittance and discharge to the erle of Dunbar of the Kingis jowellis and gardrob.
Not public and general	1606 c. 22 —	11 July 1606
Act anent the chapell royall and exceptionis thairfra in favouris of the erle of Dunbar and lord of Balcleugh.
Commission on Erections Act 1606 (repealed)	1606 c. 23 —	11 July 1606
Commissioun anent the erectionis. (Repealed by Statute Law Revision (Scotland) Act 1906 (6 Edw. 7. c. 38))
Not public and general	1606 c. 24 —	11 July 1606
Act in favouris of the tennentis of Casche.
Not public and general	1606 c. 25; 1606 c. 18	11 July 1606
Dissolutioun of Huntingtoure and Strath brawne.
Not public and general	1606 c. 26 —	11 July 1606
Act in favouris of Sanctandrous archibischop in satisfactioun of monymaill.
Not public and general	1606 c. 27 —	11 July 1606
Act anent the erectioun of the kirk of Leith benorth the brig in ane paroche kirk.
Not public and general	1606 c. 28 —	11 July 1606
Act anent the dismembering of certane townis frome the kirk of Ellon and incorporating of the samyn to the kirk of Slaynis.
Not public and general	1606 c. 29 —	11 July 1606
Erectioun of the kirk of Prestoun.
Not public and general	1606 c. 30 —	11 July 1606
Act anent the erectioun of the kirk of Portincraig.
Not public and general	1606 c. 31 —	11 July 1606
Act in favouris of the burgh of Edinburgh.
Not public and general	1606 c. 32 —	11 July 1606
Act in favouris of the burgh of Perth.
Not public and general	1606 c. 33 —	11 July 1606
Act in favouris of the burgh of Dundie.
Not public and general	1606 c. 34 —	11 July 1606
Act in favouris of the burgh of Aberdene.
Not public and general	1606 c. 35 —	11 July 1606
Act in favouris of the burgh of Aberdene anent the ratificatioun of the chartour grantit be M^{r} Alex^{r} Hay.
Not public and general	1606 c. 36 —	11 July 1606
Act in favouris of the burgh of Irving.
Not public and general	1606 c. 37 —	11 July 1606
Act in favouris of the burgh of Banff.
College of Justice Act 1606 (repealed)	1606 c. 38 —	11 July 1606
Act in favouris of the senatouris of the College of Justice and memberis of the samyn. Act in favour of the senators of the College of Justice and the members of the same. (Repealed by Statute Law Revision (Scotland) Act 1906 (6 Edw. 7. c. 38))
Not public and general	1606 c. 39 —	11 July 1606
Ratificatioun of the kirk of Nather Airlie in favouris of Sir Thomas Lyoun of Auldbar knycht.
Not public and general	1606 c. 40 —	11 July 1606
Act in favouris of Williame commendatore of Towngland.
Not public and general	1606 c. 41 —	11 July 1606
Act in favouris of M^{r} Johne Prestoun of Penycuke collectour to oure soverane lord.
Not public and general	1606 c. 42 —	11 July 1606
Ratificatioun in favouris of James Hay of Kingask of his infeftment of the few fermes of Grangemuir.
Not public and general	1606 c. 43 —	11 July 1606
Ratificatioun in favouris of Patrik Kynnard of that Ilk of his infeftment of his landis of Kynnard.
Not public and general	1606 c. 44 —	11 July 1606
Act in favouris of M^{r} Alex^{r} Hay anent the dispositioun to him of the fewfermes of Ardett and Drone under reversioun of twentie thowsandis merkis money.
Not public and general	1606 c. 45 —	11 July 1606
Ratificatioun in favouris of Marjorie Marjoribankis relict of umquhile M^{r} Johne Durie minister of hir pensioun.
Not public and general	1606 c. 46 —	11 July 1606
Ratificatioun in favouris of the marquessis of Hammyltoun and Huntlie of thair marquisadis.
Not public and general	1606 c. 47 —	11 July 1606
Ratificatioun to the erle of Angus and to the lord Dowglas his sone of thair infeftment.
Not public and general	1606 c. 48 —	11 July 1606
Act in favouris of the erle of Cathnes.
Not public and general	1606 c. 49 —	11 July 1606
Ratificatioun in favouris of the lord Lyndesay.
Not public and general	1606 c. 50 —	11 July 1606
Act in favouris of Sir Johne Moncreiff.
Not public and general	1606 c. 51 —	11 July 1606
Ratificatioun in favouris of Williame Lermonth of Hill.
Not public and general	1606 c. 52 —	11 July 1606
Act in favouris of the towne and bischop of Dunkeld.
Not public and general	1606 c. 53 —	11 July 1606
Ratificatioun of the erectioun of the schole of Dunkeld.
Not public and general	1606 c. 54 —	11 July 1606
Act in favouris of the capitane and keiparis of the castell of Dunbartane.
Not public and general	1606 c. 55 —	11 July 1606
Act in favouris of George and M^{r} Petir Hayis.
Not public and general	1606 c. 56 —	11 July 1606
Ratificatioun in favouris of the young laird of Calderwood of certane takkis of teyndis.
Not public and general	1606 c. 57 —	11 July 1606
Act in favouris of Barnard Lyndesay of the kingis wark in Leith.
Not public and general	1606 c. 58 —	11 July 1606
Ratificatioun in favouris of Sir Alexander Stratoun of Laurenstoun knycht of his pensioun.
Not public and general	1606 c. 59 —	11 July 1606
Ratificatioun in favouris of the laird of Balmaghie.
Not public and general	1606 c. 60 —	11 July 1606
Act in favouris of the laird of Burlie.
Not public and general	1606 c. 61; 1606 c. 19	11 July 1606
Act of dissolutioun of the Lowmondis.
Not public and general	1606 c. 62 —	11 July 1606
Act in favouris of the erle of Errole anent blankis.
Not public and general	1606 c. 63 —	11 July 1606
Act in favouris of Williame maister of Murray of Tullibardin anent the changeing of the name of the baronie of Trewin in Earne.
Not public and general	1606 c. 64 —	11 July 1606
Ratificatioun in favouris of M^{r} Johne Drummond of his office of clerkschip.
Not public and general	1606 c. 65 —	11 July 1606
Ratificatioun in favouris of Sir Johne Arnote of his gift of the impost of threttie tounis wyne.
Not public and general	1606 c. 66 —	11 July 1606
Ratificatioun in favouris of Sir Johne Arnote of his infeftment of his landis in Orknay.
Not public and general	1606 c. 67 —	11 July 1606
Ratificatioun in favouris of the laird of Moncreif of his pensioun.
Saving the Rights Act 1606 Not public and general	1606 c. 68; 1606 c. 20	11 July 1606
Act anent salvo jure cujuslibet. Act about salvo jure cujuslibet.
Not public and general	1606 c. 69 —	11 July 1606
Erectioun of the lordschip of Abirbrothok in favouris of James marques of Hammyltoun.
Not public and general	1606 c. 70 —	11 July 1606
Erectioun of the lordschip and baronie of Kylismure with the kirk of Mauchlane in favouris of the lord Lowdoun.
Dilapidation of Bishoprics Act 1606 (repealed)	1606 c. 71; 1606 c. 3	11 July 1606
Act anent the dilapidatioun of bishoprikis. Act about the dilapidation of bishoprics. (Repealed by Statute Law Revision (Scotland) Act 1906 (6 Edw. 7. c. 38))
Not public and general	1606 c. 72 —	11 July 1606
Erectioun of Dundrennan in favouris of Johne Murray.
Not public and general	1606 c. 73 —	11 July 1606
Ratificatioun in favouris of M^{r} Archibald Moncreif of his pensioun.
Not public and general	1606 c. 74 —	11 July 1606
Ratificatioun to the kirk of Borthuik.
Not public and general	1606 c. 75 —	11 July 1606
Ratificatioun in favouris of M^{r} Laurence Gordoun of his infeftment of Glenluce.
Not public and general	1606 c. 76 —	11 July 1606
Erectioun of the abbacie of Scone in ane temporall lordschip in favouris of David lord of Scone.
Not public and general	1606 c. 77 —	11 July 1606
Ratificatioun in favouris of the lord Abircorne of his infeftment off Abircorne.
Not public and general	1606 c. 78 —	11 July 1606
The commissioneris warrant anent the provisioun of the kirk of Abircorne.
Not public and general	1606 c. 79 —	11 July 1606
Act in favouris of James Maxuell and Robert Douglas.
Not public and general	1606 c. 80 —	11 July 1606
Annexatioun of the personage and vicarage of Glasgou to the archibischoprik there of.
Not public and general	1606 c. 81 —	11 July 1606
Erectioun of the lordschip of Halieroodhous.
Not public and general	1606 c. 82 —	11 July 1606
Act in favouris of M^{r} Robert Williamsone of the tempillandis fra the crowne.
Not public and general	1606 c. 83 —	11 July 1606
Act in favouris of S^{r} George Bruce anent the ratificatioun of his infeftment of Carnok.
Not public and general	1606 c. 84 —	11 July 1606
Act in favouris of M^{r} Williame Scott of Elie anent his landis of Grangemuir Wester.
Not public and general	1606 c. 85 —	11 July 1606
Act in favouris of my lord great commissioner anent the landis of Cowgask.
Not public and general	1606 c. 86 —	11 July 1606
Ratificatioun in favouris of the lord of Scone of his pensioun of ten chalderis victuall furth of the priorie of S^{t} Androus.
Not public and general	1606 c. 87 —	11 July 1606
Exceptioun in favouris of Sir Thomas Hammyltoun of Bynnyng knycht frome the erectioun of Jedburgh.
Not public and general	1606 c. 88 —	11 July 1606
Exceptioun in favouris of Sir Thomas Hammyltoun of Bynning knycht frome the erectioun of Elcho.
Not public and general	1606 c. 89 —	11 July 1606
Erectioun of the abbacie of Couper in ane temporal lordschip in favouris of James Elphingstoun.
Not public and general	1606 c. 90 —	11 July 1606
Erectioun of the abbacie of Balmirrenoch with the landis and baroneis of Kirknewtoun and Ballerno unite thairto in ane temporall lordschip in favouris of the lord Balmirrenoch.
Not public and general	1606 c. 91 —	11 July 1606
Erectioun of the abbaceis of Dryburgh and Cambuskynneth and priorie of Inchmahomo in ane temporal lordschip callit the lordschip of Cardrois in favouris of the erle of Mar.
Not public and general	1606 c. 92 —	11 July 1606
Ratificatioun in favouris of Alexander erle of Dunfermeling lord Chancellar.
Not public and general	1606 c. 93 —	11 July 1606
Ratificatioun in favouris of the laird of Kylsayth of his infeftment thairof.
Not public and general	1606 c. 94 —	11 July 1606
Ratificatioun in favouris of the lord Balmirrenoch and his sone James Elphing stoun of thair infeftmentis of Ballumbie and Barntoun.
Not public and general	1606 c. 95 —	11 July 1606
Erectioun of the priorie of Sanctandrois in ane temporall lordschip in favouris of the duk of Lennox.
Not public and general	1606 c. 96 —	11 July 1606
Erectioun of the abbacie of Lundoris in ane temporall lordschip in favouris of lord Lundoris.
Not public and general	1606 c. 97 —	11 July 1606
Ratificatioun in favouris of M^{r} Alexanander Gibsoun of his infeftment of Grantoun.
Not public and general	1606 c. 98 —	11 July 1606
Act in favouris of the vicount of Fentoun anent the dissolutioun of Restenneth fra the abbacie of Jedburgh.
Not public and general	1606 c. 99 —	11 July 1606
Ratificatioun in favouris of the laird of Kinnard Carnegie.
Not public and general	1606 c. 100 —	11 July 1606
Ratificatioun in favouris of the lord Uchiltrie of his infeftment of the kirkland of Uchiltrie.
Not public and general	1606 c. 101 —	11 July 1606
Erectioun of the abbacies of Jedburgh and Coldinghame in ane temporall lord schip in favouris of the erle of Home.
Not public and general	1606 c. 102 —	11 July 1606
Erectioun of the priorie of Pittinweme in favouris of Frederik Stewart.

=== Sources ===
- Alexander, William (1841). "Acta Parliamentorum Regis Jacobi Sexti". An Abridgement of the Acts of the Parliaments of Scotland. Edinburgh: Adam and Charles Black. pp. A38 – A40 – via Google Books.
- Alexander, William (1841). "Acta Parliamentorum Regis Jacobi Sexti". An Abridgement of the Acts of the Parliaments of Scotland. Edinburgh: Adam and Charles Black. pp. A38 – A40 – via Google Books.
- Chronological Table of the Statutes. London: Her Majesty's Stationery Office. 1972. p. 1346 – via Google Books.
- "Acts of the Old Scottish Parliament: 1606". legislation.gov.uk. The National Archives.
- "Index of Statutes: Index of Statutes: James VI (1567-1625)". Records of the Parliaments of Scotland to 1707. University of St Andrews.

== See also ==
- List of legislation in the United Kingdom
- Records of the Parliaments of Scotland
