= List of acts of the Parliament of Scotland from 1698 =

This is a list of acts of the Parliament of Scotland for the year 1698.

It lists acts of Parliament of the old Parliament of Scotland, that was merged with the old Parliament of England to form the Parliament of Great Britain, by the Union with England Act 1707 (c. 7).

For other years, see list of acts of the Parliament of Scotland. For the period after 1707, see list of acts of the Parliament of Great Britain.

== 1698 ==
The 7th session of the parliament of William and Mary, held in Edinburgh from 19 July 1698.

Short title, or popular name	Citation	Royal assent
Long title
Supply Act 1698 (repealed)	1698 c. 1 (Note: This is the citation in the Record Edition.); 1698 c. 1 (Note: This is the citation in the Duodecimal Edition.)	30 July 1698
Act anent the Supply of Sixteen Months Cess upon the Land Rent. Act regarding the Supply of Sixteen Month's Cess upon the Land Rent. (Repealed by Statute Law Revision (Scotland) Act 1906 (6 Edw. 7. c. 38))
Vacant Churches Act 1698 (repealed)	1698 c. 2; 1698 c. 2	30 August 1698
Act for preventing of disorders in the Supplying and Planting of vacant Churches. Act for preventing of disorders in the Supplying and Planting of vacant Churches. (Repealed by Statute Law Revision (Scotland) Act 1964 (c. 80))
Salmon Act 1698 (repealed)	1698 c. 3; 1698 c. 3	30 August 1698
Act against Pocknet fishing upon the Water of Forth. Act against bag-net fishing upon the water of Forth. (Repealed by Statute Law Revision (Scotland) Act 1964 (c. 80))
Registration Act 1698 (repealed)	1698 c. 4; 1698 c. 4	30 August 1698
Act concerning Registration of Probative Writs. Act concerning Registration of Probative Writs. (Repealed by Requirements of Writing (Scotland) Act 1995 (c. 7))
Minors Act 1698 (repealed)	1698 c. 5; 1698 c. 5	30 August 1698
Act in favors of Minors anent Registrating Summonds and Instruments of Interruption. Act in favour of Minors regarding Registration of Summons and Instruments of Interruption. (Repealed by Statute Law Revision (Scotland) Act 1906 (6 Edw. 7. c. 38))
Clandestine Marriages Act 1698 (repealed)	1698 c. 6; 1698 c. 6	30 August 1698
Act against Clandestine and Irregular Marriages. Act against Clandestine and Irregular Marriages. (Repealed by Statute Law Revision (Scotland) Act 1964 (c. 80))
Sumptuary Act 1698 (repealed)	1698 c. 7; 1698 c. 7	30 August 1698
Act Dischargeing the Wearing of Gold and Silver Lace. Act Prohibiting the Wearing of Gold and Silver Lace. (Repealed by Statute Law Revision (Scotland) Act 1906 (6 Edw. 7. c. 38))
Edinburgh Building Act 1698 Not public and general	1698 c. 8; 1698 c. 8	30 August 1698
Act Regulating the manner of Building within the Toun of Edinburgh. Act Regulating the manner of Building within the Town of Edinburgh.
Quartering of Soldiers Act 1698 (repealed)	1698 c. 9; 1698 c. 9	30 August 1698
Act anent Quartering of Souldiers. Act regarding Quartering of Soldiers. (Repealed by Statute Law Revision (Scotland) Act 1906 (6 Edw. 7. c. 38))
Quartering for Deficiency Act 1698 (repealed)	1698 c. 10; 1698 c. 10	30 August 1698
Act anent Quartering for Deficiency. Act regarding Quartering for Deficiency. (Repealed by Statute Law Revision (Scotland) Act 1906 (6 Edw. 7. c. 38))
Vassals of Bishops' Lands Act 1698 (repealed)	1698 c. 11; 1698 c. 11	30 August 1698
Act for the Ease of small Vassalls of Bishops Lands now holden of the King. Act for the Ease of small Vassals of Bishops' Lands now held of the King. (Repealed by Statute Law Revision (Scotland) Act 1964 (c. 80))
Supply (No. 2) Act 1698 (repealed)	1698 c. 12; 1698 c. 12	30 August 1698
Act anent Pole Money. Act regarding Poll-money. (Repealed by Statute Law Revision (Scotland) Act 1906 (6 Edw. 7. c. 38))
Not public and general	1698 c. 13 — (Note: This act is not listed in the Duodecimal Edition.)	30 August 1698
Act in favors of the Manufactory for Ropes and Cordage at Glasgow. Act in favour of the Manufactory for Ropes and Cordage at Glasgow.
Macers of Court of Session Act 1698 (repealed)	1698 c. 14; 1698 c. 13	30 August 1698
Act in favors of the Four Ordinary Macers of the Session. Act in favour of the Four Ordinary Macers of the Session. (Repealed by Statute Law Revision (Scotland) Act 1906 (6 Edw. 7. c. 38))
Not public and general	1698 c. 15 —	31 August 1698
Ratification in favors of James Duke of Queensberry (Note: James Douglas, 2nd Duke of Queensberry.) of the Earldom and Regality of Drumlangrig. Ratification in favour of James, Duke of Queensberry, of the Earldom and Regality of Drumlanrig.
Not public and general	1698 c. 16 —	31 August 1698
Ratification in favors of James Viscount of Seafield (Note: James Ogilvy, 3rd Earl of Findlater.) of the Lordship Regality and Barony of Ogilvie. Ratification in favour of James, Viscount of Seafield, of the Lordship, Regality and Barony of Ogilvy.
Not public and general	1698 c. 17 —	31 August 1698
Ratification in favors of George Baillie of Jerviswood of the Lands and Barony of Mellerstains. Ratification in favour of George Baillie of Jerviswood, of the Lands and Barony of Mellerstain.
Not public and general	1698 c. 18 —	31 August 1698
Ratification in favors of Mr Francis Grant Advocat of the Lands of Cullen and others. Ratification in favour of Mr Francis Grant, advocate, of the Lands of Cullen, and others.
Not public and general	1698 c. 19 —	31 August 1698
Ratification in favours of Mr David Ramsay Writer to the Signet of the Lands and Barony of Inchtuthill. Ratification in favour of Mr David Ramsay, Writer to the Signet, of the Lands and Barony of Inchtuthil.
Not public and general	1698 c. 20 —	31 August 1698
Ratification in favors of Patrick Huntar of Hunterstoun of the Lands of Campbelltoun. Ratification in favour of Patrick Hunter of Hunterston, of the Lands of Campbelton.
Not public and general	1698 c. 21 —	31 August 1698
Act in favors of David Earl of Northesk (Note: David Carnegie, 4th Earl of Northesk.) for two yearly fairs and a weekly mercat at the toun of Inverkeillor. Act in favour of David, Earl of Northesk, for two yearly fairs and a weekly market at the town of ???.
Not public and general	1698 c. 22 —	31 August 1698
Act in favors of the Burgh of Kinghorn for two yearly fairs. Act in favour of the Burgh of Kinghorn, for two yearly fairs.
Not public and general	1698 c. 23 —	31 August 1698
Act in favors of James Ogilvy of Cluny for two yearly fairs and a weekly mercat at the toun of Cluny. Act in favour of James Ogilvie of Clunie, for two yearly fairs and a weekly market at the town of Clunie.
Not public and general	1698 c. 24 —	31 August 1698
Act in favors of Mr Robert Forbes Advocat for a yearly fair at the Toun of Torphins. Act in favour of Mr Robert Forbes, Advocate, for a yearly fair at the Town of Torphins.
Not public and general	1698 c. 25 —	31 August 1698
Act in favors of M^{r} Archibald Douglass of Cavers for a weekly mercat at the Toun of Denholm. Act in favour of Mr Archibald Douglas of Cavers, for a weekly market at the Town of Denholm.
Not public and general	1698 c. 26 —	31 August 1698
Act in favors of James Hay of Reanes for two yearly fairs on the Muir of Rannachies. Act in favour of James Hay of Reanes, for two yearly fairs on the Muir of Rannachy.
Not public and general	1698 c. 27 —	31 August 1698
Act in favors of the Burgh of Dundee for a yearly fair. Act in favour of the Burgh of Dundee for a yearly fair.
Not public and general	1698 c. 28 —	31 August 1698
Act in favors of Thomas Forbes of Watertoun for two yearly fairs at the Kirktoun of Ellon. Act in favour of Thomas Forbes of Waterton, for two yearly fairs at the Kirkton of Ellon.
Not public and general	1698 c. 29 —	31 August 1698
Act in favors of the Burgh of Dingwall for a yearly fair. Act in favour of the Burgh of Dingwall, for a yearly fair.
Not public and general	1698 c. 30 —	31 August 1698
Act in favors of the Burgh of Inverness for a yearly fair. Act in favour of the Burgh of Inverness, for a yearly fair.
Not public and general	1698 c. 31 —	31 August 1698
Act in favors of George Duke of Gordon (Note: George Gordon, 1st Duke of Gordon.) for two yearly fairs on the Muir of Rynnie. Act in favour of George, Duke of Gordon, for two yearly fairs on the Muir of Rhynie.
Not public and general	1698 c. 32 —	1 September 1698
Act in favors of the Earl of Loudoun (Note: Hugh Campbell, 3rd Earl of Loudoun.) for a yearly fair at the Toun of Mauchline. Act in favour of the Earl of Loudoun, for a yearly fair at the Town of Mauchline.
College of Justice Act 1698 (repealed)	1698 c. 33; 1698 c. 14	1 September 1698
Act in favors of the Senators of the Colledge of Justice. Act in favour of the Senators of the College of Justice. (Repealed by Statute Law Revision (Scotland) Act 1906 (6 Edw. 7. c. 38))
Game Act 1698 (repealed)	1698 c. 34; 1698 c. 15	1 September 1698
Act for preserving the Game. Act for preserving the Game. (Repealed by Statute Law Revision (Scotland) Act 1906 (6 Edw. 7. c. 38))
Planting Act 1698 (repealed)	1698 c. 35; 1698 c. 16	1 September 1698
Act for preserving of Planting. Act for preserving of Planting. (Repealed by Statute Law Revision (Scotland) Act 1964 (c. 80))
Travellers to France Act 1698 (repealed)	1698 c. 36; 1698 c. 17	1 September 1698
Act anent Persons going to and returning from France. Act regarding persons going to and returning from France. (Repealed by Statute Law Revision (Scotland) Act 1906 (6 Edw. 7. c. 38))
Tonnage Act 1698 (repealed)	1698 c. 37; 1698 c. 18	1 September 1698
Act anent the Tunnage. Act regarding the Tunnage. (Repealed by Statute Law Revision (Scotland) Act 1906 (6 Edw. 7. c. 38))
Burghs Act 1698 (repealed)	1698 c. 38; 1698 c. 19	1 September 1698
Act Regulating the Trade betwixt burghs Royall and Burghs of Regality Barony and others. Act Regulating the Trade between Royal burghs, and Burghs of Regality, Barony and others. (Repealed by Statute Law Revision (Scotland) Act 1906 (6 Edw. 7. c. 38))
Trade Act 1698 (repealed)	1698 c. 39; 1698 c. 20	1 September 1698
Act for settleing the Communication of Trade. Act for settleing the Communication of Trade. (Repealed by Statute Law Revision (Scotland) Act 1964 (c. 80))
Poor Act 1698 (repealed)	1698 c. 40; 1698 c. 21	1 September 1698
Act anent the Poor. Act regarding the Poor. (Repealed by Statute Law Revision (Scotland) Act 1906 (6 Edw. 7. c. 38))
Personal Protections Act 1698 (repealed)	1698 c. 41; 1698 c. 22	1 September 1698
Act against Personal Protections. Act against Personal Protections. (Repealed by Statute Law Revision (Scotland) Act 1906 (6 Edw. 7. c. 38))
Brandy Act 1698 (repealed)	1698 c. 42; 1698 c. 23	1 September 1698
Act anent the Excyse of Brandie. Act anent the Excise of Brandy. (Repealed by Statute Law Revision (Scotland) Act 1906 (6 Edw. 7. c. 38))
Sea Fishing Act 1698 (repealed)	1698 c. 43; 1698 c. 24	1 September 1698
Act for the Encouragement of White fishing and Herring fishing. Act for the Encouragement of White fishing and Herring fishing. (Repealed by Statute Law Revision (Scotland) Act 1906 (6 Edw. 7. c. 38))
Supply (No. 3) Act 1698 (repealed)	1698 c. 44; 1698 c. 25	1 September 1698
Act continueing the Pole. Act continuing the Poll. (Repealed by Statute Law Revision (Scotland) Act 1906 (6 Edw. 7. c. 38))
Not public and general	1698 c. 45 —	1 September 1698
Act and Ratification in favors of the Glass Manufactory at the Weems. Act and Ratification in favour of the Glass Manufactory at the Wemyss.
Not public and general	1698 c. 46 —	1 September 1698
Act and Ratification in favors of the Glass Manufactory at Morisons haven. Act and Ratification in favour of the Glass Manufactory at Morison's Haven.
Supply (No. 4) Act 1698 (repealed)	1698 c. 47; 1698 c. 26	1 September 1698
Act and Remit to the Commission of the Pole. Act and Remit to the Commission of the Poll. (Repealed by Statute Law Revision (Scotland) Act 1906 (6 Edw. 7. c. 38))
Not public and general	1698 c. 48 —	1 September 1698
Protection in favors of Captain James Drummond of Hill. Protection in favour of Captain James Drummond of Hill.
Saving the Rights Act 1698 Not public and general	1698 c. 49; 1698 c. 27	1 September 1698
Act Salvo Jure Cujuslibet. Act Salvo Jure Cujuslibet.
Adjournment Act 1698 (repealed)	Vol. X, p. 182; 1698 c. 28	1 September 1698
Act of adjournment. Act of adjournment. (Repealed by Statute Law Revision (Scotland) Act 1906 (6 Edw. 7. c. 38))

=== Sources ===
- Alexander, William (1841). "Acta Parliamentorum Gulielmi et Mariæ". An Abridgement of the Acts of the Parliaments of Scotland. Edinburgh: Adam and Charles Black. pp. A84 – A85 – via Google Books.
- Alexander, William (1841). "Acta Parliamentorum Gulielmi et Mariæ". An Abridgement of the Acts of the Parliaments of Scotland. Edinburgh: Adam and Charles Black. pp. A84 – A85 – via Google Books.
- Chronological Table of the Statutes. London: Her Majesty's Stationery Office. 1972. p. 1366 – via Google Books.
- "Acts of the Old Scottish Parliament: 1698". legislation.gov.uk. The National Archives.
- "Index of Statutes: Index of Statutes: William II (1694-1702)". Records of the Parliaments of Scotland to 1707. University of St Andrews.

== See also ==
- List of legislation in the United Kingdom
- Records of the Parliaments of Scotland
