= Duelling (Scotland) Act 1819 =

Act of the Parliament of the United Kingdom

- Act of Parliament
- Parliament of the United Kingdom
- Long title: An Act to repeal certain Acts of the Parliament of Scotland, regarding Duelling.
- Citation: 59 Geo. 3. c. 70
- Territorial extent: United Kingdom

Dates
- Royal assent: 3 July 1819
- Commencement: 3 July 1819 (Note: The Acts of Parliament (Commencement) Act 1793.)
- Repealed: 5 August 1873
Other legislation
Repeals/revokes	See § Repealed enactments
Repealed by	Statute Law Revision Act 1873

Status: Repealed

Text of statute as originally enacted

The Duelling (Scotland) Act 1819 (59 Geo. 3. c. 70) was an act of the Parliament of the United Kingdom that repealed two earlier acts of the Parliament of Scotland concerning duelling.

== Provisions ==
=== Repealed enactments ===
Section 1 of the act repealed 2 enactments, listed in that section.

Citation	Short title	Description	Extent of repeal
1600 (c. 21)	Duels Act 1600	Anent Singular Combats.	The whole act.
1696 (c. 37)	Duels Act 1696	Act against Duels.	The whole act.

== Subsequent developments ==
The whole act was repealed by section 1 of, and the schedule to, the Statute Law Revision Act 1873 (36 & 37 Vict. c. 91), which came into force on 5 August 1873.
