= Statute Law Revision (Scotland) Act 1964 =

Act of the Parliament of the United Kingdom

Statute Law Revision (Scotland) Act 1964 (Note: Section 4.)
- Act of Parliament
- Parliament of the United Kingdom
- Long title: An Act to revise the statute law of Scotland by repealing obsolete, spent, unnecessary, or superseded enactments, and to facilitate the citation of statutes
- Citation: 1964 c. 80
- Introduced by: Lord Dilhorne, Lord Chancellor (Lords)
- Territorial extent: United Kingdom (Note: The act extends to the United Kingdom because the contrary was not specified. but only of practical effect in Scotland.)

Dates
- Royal assent: 31 July 1964
- Commencement: 31 July 1964 (Note: The Acts of Parliament (Commencement) Act 1793.)
- Repealed: 8 November 1995
Other legislation
Repeals/revokes	Act anent Letters passing the Signet.; Act in favors of Universities Schools and Hospitalls.; Acts anent Registration of Seasins and other writts and diligences.; Act for preventing of disorders in the Supplying and Planting of vacant Churches.; Act against Pocknet fishing upon the Water of Forth.; Act against Clandestine and Irregular Marriages; Act for the Ease of small Vassalls of Bishops Lands now holden of the King.; Act for preserving of Planting.; Act for settleing the Communication of Trade.; Act anent Plantation of Kirks and Valuation of Teinds.; Act for preserving the Game.
Amended by	Statute Law (Repeals) Act 1974
Repealed by	Statute Law (Repeals) Act 1995

Status: Repealed

Text of statute as originally enacted

The Statute Law Revision (Scotland) Act 1964 (c. 80) was an act of the Parliament of the United Kingdom.

It was prepared by the Statute Law Committee. It further revised the pre-Union acts of the Parliament of Scotland which had previously revised by the Statute Law Revision (Scotland) Act 1906. Its purpose was to repeal obsolete enactments, to take into account changes in the law, and to facilitate the indexing of those acts in the Chronological Table of the Statutes and the Index to the Statutes.

The bill that became this act was introduced into the House of Lords.

== Subsequent developments ==
Section 1 of, and schedule 1 to, the act were repealed by section 1 of, and part XXX of the schedule to, the Statute Law (Repeals) Act 1974, which came into force on 27 June 1974. The repeal of this section and schedule 1 did not revive the acts that they repealed.

== Provisions ==
Repealed enactments

This section repealed a number of pre-Union acts of the Parliament of Scotland, which were declared to be obsolete, spent or unnecessary, or to have been superseded by other enactments, either in full or in part. Those acts were listed in schedule 1.

Short titles

Section 2 conferred short titles on the 164 pre-Union acts of the Parliament of Scotland, listed in schedule 2 to the act, which were not repealed by section 1.

It was expressly provided that those acts could be cited by those short titles "without prejudice to any other mode of citation".

Those acts may continue to be cited by those short titles notwithstanding the repeal of this section and Schedule 2.

Section 3 – Construction of Schedules

Section 3 of the act provided that (the citation of the acts in) the schedules were to be construed as referring to the Revised Edition of the Acts of the Parliament of Scotland, prepared by the Statute Law Committee, printed in 1908.

Section 4

Section 4 of the act provided the act's short title.

== See also ==
- Statute Law Revision Act

== Bibliography ==
- Partial text of the act (as reproduced in House of Lords Committee for Privileges, 2nd report of Session 1998–99, Proceedings of the Committee (HL 108-I), Appendix 4(16))
- John Burke (editor), Current Law Statutes Annotated 1964, Sweet and Maxwell
- Hansard (House of Lords), 25 June 1964, vol. 259, col. 320
- Hansard (House of Lords), 2 July 1964, vol. 259, col. 715
- Hansard (House of Lords), 8 July 1964, vol. 259, col. 1086
- Hansard (House of Lords), 20 July 1964, vol. 260, col. 452
- Hansard (House of Commons), 22 July 1964, vol. 699, col. 625 - 639
- Hansard (House of Commons), 24 July 1964, vol. 699, col. 934
- Hansard (House of Commons), 24 July 1964, vol. 699, col. 934 - 946
- Hansard (House of Lords), 27 July 1964, vol. 260, col. 960
- Hansard (House of Commons), 31 July 1964, vol. 699, col. 1948 - 50 (royal assent)
- (1965) 16 Northern Ireland Legal Quarterly 168 (No 1)
- Stanley Scott Robinson. The Law of Game, Salmon & Freshwater Fishing in Scotland. Butterworths. 1990. Page 5.
- "Ane End of Ane Old Song" (1965) 84 Law Notes 210 (No 9)
- "England Repeals the American Colonies Act of 1766" (1965) 17 Stanford Law Review 1178 et seq (No 6, July 1965)
- Reid and Zimmermann (eds). A History of Private Law in Scotland. Oxford University Press. 2000. Volume 2. Page 502.
- Colin Turpin and Adam Tomkins. British Government and the Constitution: Text and Materials. Sixth Edition. Cambridge University Press. 2007. Page 201.
- 124 International Law Reports 580, 583, 595 and 596
- Robery Megarry. A New Miscellany-at-Law. Bryan A Garner (ed). Hart Publishing. Lawbook Exchange. 2005. Page 56.
