= Scots property law =

Rules relating to property in Scotland

Scots property law governs the rules relating to property found in the legal jurisdiction of Scotland.

In Scots law, the term 'property' does not solely describe land. Instead the term 'a person's property' is used when describing objects or 'things' (in Latin res) that an individual holds a right of ownership in. It is the rights that an individual holds in a 'thing' that are the subject matter of Scots property law.

The terms objects or 'things' is also a wide-ranging definition, and is based on Roman law principles. Objects (or things) can be physical (such as land, a house, a car, a statue or a keyring) or they can also be unseen but still capable of being owned, (e.g. a person can have a right to payment under a contract, a lease in a house, or intellectual property rights in relation to works (s)he produced). While this may appear to encompass a wide range of 'things', they can be classified and sorted according to a legal system's rules. In Scots property law, all 'things' can be classified according to their nature, discussed below, with four classes of property as a result:

- Corporeal heritable property (e.g. land, building, apartment, etc.)
- Incorporeal heritable property (e.g. a lease, a right in a contract for sale of a house, a liferent, etc.)
- Corporeal moveable property (e.g. furniture, car, books, etc.)
- Incorporeal moveable property (e.g. intellectual property rights, rights of payment arising from contract or delict, etc.)

Each class of property has rules concerning the real rights (or rights in rem) an individual may have in that property.

== Sources of Scots property law ==
Prior to the Kingdoms of Scotland and England & Wales' unification as the Kingdom of Great Britain, Scots property law was largely governed by acts of the Parliament of Scotland and common law decisions by the Scottish judiciary. Its roots predominantly lay in Roman law and the ius commune, however feudalism was also introduced into Scots property law as a result of the Davidian Revolution in the 12th century so the legal system developed a distinct property law. In the 17th and 18th century, a group of academics, now called the institutional writers, wrote authoritative texts on large areas of Scots law, including property law, which came to be regarded as a formal source of law from the 19th century onwards.

Following the Acts of Union 1707, Scots Law and its courts, such as the Court of Session, continued to operate as a separate legal system in the Kingdom of Great Britain under the terms of Article XIX (19) of the Treaty of Union. The jurisdiction retained its independence following the creation of subsequent United Kingdom states in 1801 and 1922, although Scots law was subject to modification by Acts of the Parliament of Great Britain, and latterly, the Parliaments of the United Kingdoms, and from judgements of the Appellate Committee of the House of Lords in appeals from the Court of Session.

Today, Scots property law is part of Scots private law and as such is a devolved competence of the Scottish Parliament under the Scotland Act 1998. The Scottish Parliament has introduced key pieces of legislation in relating to property law: notably the Land Reform (Scotland) Act 2003, the Abolition of Feudal Tenure etc. (Scotland) Act 2000 and the Land Registration (Scotland) Act 2012. However, large areas of Scots property law still remain governed by pre-existing legal authority predating the creation of the Scottish Parliament on 12 May 1999, so its current sources of law include:

- The works of the Institutional Writers.
- Common law decisions of the Scottish courts, including judgments of the House of Lords (and its successor, the Supreme Court of the United Kingdom), in civil appeals from the Court of Session.
- Acts of the Parliament of the Kingdom of Scotland.
- Acts of the Parliament of Great Britain, latterly Acts of the Parliament of the United Kingdom.
- Acts of the Scottish Parliament.

== Recognised property rights in Scots law ==
=== Introduction ===
Persons (both natural and juristic) have a patrimony, also known as an estate, containing all the person's rights (i.e. their legal entitlements) with an economic value (termed patrimonial rights) and all their liabilities. This definition is wide-ranging so will encompass all the rights, such as the right of ownership or contractual rights, a person may have. Most persons will only have one patrimony, but in the case of a trustee, an individual may have two separate patrimonies. Patrimonial rights that a person holds in a thing or object are the focus of property law; these are called ‘real rights’ (in Latin: ius in rem, lit. ‘a right in a thing’) and Scots law distinguishes real rights from any other rights that a person may hold.

The recognised real rights a person can have in Scots law are:

- Ownership
- Lease of heritable property.
- Right in security
- Servitude
- Real burdens
- Liferent

Ownership is the main real right, with all other real rights subordinate to ownership.

=== Personal rights and real rights ===
Scots law follows the Roman law classification of rights falling into either of two categories: a personal right (ius in personam) or a real right (ius in rem), which Nicholas describes as:

"Any claim is either in rem or in personam, and there is an unbridgeable division between them. An action in rem asserts a relationship between a person and a thing, an action in personam a relationship between persons. The Romans think in terms of actions not of rights, but in substance one action asserts a right over a thing, the other a right against a person, and hence comes the modern dichotomy between rights in rem and rights in personam. Obviously there cannot be a dispute between a person and a thing, and therefore even in an action in rem there must be a defendant, but he is there not because he is alleged to be under any duty to the plaintiff but because by some act he is denying the alleged right of the plaintiff."

=== Identifying personal or real rights ===
In Scots law, a personal right typically is created in contractual agreements (e.g. a contract for sale, a contract of loan, a contract of hire, etc.) or as a result of an individual committing a delict (e.g. breach of a duty of care). With personal rights, the pursuer (in other jurisdictions this is termed the plaintiff or claimant) can bring to a Scottish court an action against an individual. A real right is held in the property itself and is enforceable against the world, a pursuer can sue in relation to a real right where the defender interferes with the pursuer's real right.

Example 1: A contracts with B to purchase a piece of land. B backs out of the deal but A still wants to buy the land. A has a contractual (personal) right to sue B because they had entered into a contract. A does not have a real right in the thing because no real right had been transferred to him validly. A sues B in the Sheriff Court for breach of contract under her personal right.

Example 2: D is hit by E's car while riding his bike, committing a delict by breaching his duty of care to other road users. D now has a right in delict (a personal right) for E to pay D's damages for his injuries. D sues E in the Court of Session.

Example 3: F owns (a real right) a bike. G steals F's bike. F sees G with the bike and wants it back. F, as well as remedies available in criminal law, can raise an action in the courts against G for G's interference with F's right of ownership.

Example 4: H has a lease (a real right) in the property. G is the landlord (Owner) of the property. G tries to evict H unlawfully. H can sue G for interference with H's real right of lease.

Accordingly, within Scots private law, personal rights belong to the law of obligations whereas real rights fall within the law of property. However, any real right an individual may have in property must be recognised and valid in Scots law in order to be a true real right.

=== The recognised real rights in Scotland: The numerus clausus ===
Scots law only recognises a defined number of real rights, which follows the legal principle shared with other jurisdictions, that only real rights within the numerus clausus (closed number) are competent. Without the valid creation of a recognised real right, an individual only holds a personal right against another. This means that where an individual contracts to purchase property from another, they only hold a contractual right to the property not a real right. The principle of numerus clausus is explained in an Australian context by Edgeworth as:

"In essence, the principle holds that landowners are not at liberty to customise land rights, in the sense of reworking them in an entirely novel way to suit their particular individual needs and circumstances. Rather, any new rights must fit within firmly established pigeonholes, of which the law permits only a small and finite number. The principle applies regardless of the terms of any agreement that parties might reach for the purpose of creating such an interest, so it is irrelevant that a specific contractual arrangement to create a wholly novel interest might be free and fair."

In Scots property law, the real rights falling within the numerus clausus have never been formally codified, but it is considered that the primary real right is ownership and subordinate to it are the subordinate real rights which have come to be accepted as:

==== Liferent ====
Only the above rights, including ownership, are capable of being real rights and will only vest in an individual when they have been validly created or transferred in accordance with their respective rules.

=== Other quasi-real rights in property ===
Despite only the above being recognised as real rights, other rights that are akin to subordinate real rights are found in Scots Law that can act as an encumberance on the exercise of the right of ownership:

- Public access rights, this includes public rights of way, the 'right to roam' under the Land Reform (Scotland) Act 2003 and the public rights of access and navigation in the foreshores of Scotland arising from the Crown's right in the regalia majora.
- Legislative rights: such as occupancy rights of a spouse under the Matrimonial Homes (Family Protection) (Scotland) Act 1981.
- Exclusive privilege, typically only discussed in intellectual property.
- Possession.

=== Who can own property? ===
All persons, natural and juristic, have rights capacity, i.e. the ability to hold a right. Thus, a person is able to own property in their own right. This derives from the classification of the law of persons found in Roman law. The word 'person' is usually taken to mean a human. However, in Scots law and in many other jurisdictions, the term is also used to describe corporate entities such as companies, partnerships, Scottish Charitable Incorporate Organisation (SCIO) or other bodies corporate established by law (such as a government agency or local authority).

Organisations and associations must have the rights capacity to own property in their own right in order to act as a transferor (the person transferring ownership) or transferee (the person receiving ownership) in a voluntary transfer of land. It is necessary to check their respective articles of association, constitutions or founding legislation in order to ascertain whether the transferor and/or transferee has rights capacity in order to legally own land in Scotland. Companies and partnerships, and other corporate bodies will usually have rights capacity based on the statute enabling their creation. However, it is a matter of academic debate whether partnerships are capable of owning corporeal heritable property (land) in its own right, or whether the partners hold the property jointly in trust on behalf the partnership.

If the transferee in a voluntary transfer is an unincorporated association, for which there is no definition in Scots law but is generally interpreted as "a group of persons bound together by agreement for a particular purpose." Without a corporate body, the association has no legal person status in Scots law and as such when unincorporated associations transact to obtain ownership of the land, all the members of the association instead will own the property jointly in trust rather than ownership of the property vesting solely in the association itself.

== Principles of Scots property law ==
=== An absolute singular (unititular) right of ownership ===
Scots law follows the Roman law principle that the right of ownership in property (for definition of term see above) is absolute. Other legal systems such as United States jurisdictions consider ownership as a 'bundle of rights' which can be separated into different components and separated amongst different individuals. Instead, in Scots law ownership is a singular unitary right that cannot be broken down into different components; it can only be transferred to another in whole or be encumbered through the creation of subordinate real rights. The owner of a thing has the right to usus, fructus and abusus - the right to use, the right to the fruits (enjoyment) and the right to destroy or dispose of the property. In contrast to historically feudal systems such as England & Wales or Scotland (Davidian Revolution – 28 November 2004), ownership is not split among individuals, such as interests held by a feudal superior. Because ownership is a unitary right, when it is transferred, it vests instanter (‘instantaneously’), with the previous owner being divested of all ownership in the property, at the moment of registration in the Land Register.

=== Principle of traditio ===
Scots law follows the traditio principle which is drawn from the maxim traditionibus non nudis pactis dominia rerum transferuntur: ownership is transferred by delivery (or other disposition) and not by contract alone. As discussed above, a contract or delict only creates binding personal obligations, real rights are not capable of transfer by contract alone. Instead a disposition (i.e. a formal transfer of the property) is required. Personal rights, rights in personam, such as those arising from the missives of sale (i.e. a contract for the sale of corporeal heritable property) alone does not transfer the right of ownership in itself. Without a disposition and public act (see below), real rights cannot be validly created in Scots law.

==== Intent and consent ====
Where a voluntary transfer is made, the disposition itself must be made with the intent and consent of both parties. The disponer (usually a donor or a seller under a prior contract of sale) must have the intention to be divested of ownership (animus transferendi), and the disponee (usually a donee or a buyer under a prior contract of sale) must have the intent to be vested with ownership (animus acquirendi).

=== Principle of abstraction ===
Only a disposition, as a separate legal act, can effect the transfer of the property agreed to by contract between the parties. The contract or other obligationary legal act is the causa traditionis, or legal basis for the transfer. In Scots law the recognised causae traditionis are loan for consumption (mutuum), gift, excambion (i.e. exchange), sale, ex facie absolute disposition and transfer in trust, expressly or otherwise. However, Scotland has an abstract system of property transfer, meaning the validity of the disposition does not depend on the validity of these causae, as Viscount Stair describes:

"We do not follow that subtility of annulling deeds, because they are sine causa [i.e. without a causa (see above)] … and therefore narratives expressing the cause of the disposition, are never inquired into, because, though there were no cause, the disposition is good.’ [Brackets added]

Therefore, Scotland differs from most civil-law and common-law jurisdictions (e.g. England & Wales, US, etc.), who operate on a causal system under which the invalidity of the causa traditionis is capable of annulling the transfer overall. By abstracting the disposition stage from the formation of a contract, Scots law adopts an abstract system where the causa of the transfer may be void or voidable, but the disposition remains legally valid. Areas of Scots law, such as the law of sale in contract law have been, what is termed by some Scots legal academics as, 'anglicised', as a result of UK parliament legislation that was based on English law principles but introduced into Scots law: such as the introduction of the floating charge or the sale of moveable property into Scots law. In all other cases save the sale of corporeal moveable property, the principle of abstraction is evident in Scots law.

==== Labes reales or vitium reale ====
While a disposition may be valid irrespective of the causa traditionis, the reasons for the causa's invalidity under the law of obligations, succession, etc. may also extend to invalidate the intent to transfer as a vitium reale or labes reales (i.e. a 'real vice') in property law.

A contract may fail for numerous reasons, e.g. it may not be formally valid, the parties may lack capacity or some other mental defect affecting capacity generally or there may be no consensus in idem (i.e. a meeting of the minds in which the parties agree on the essential elements of the contract). However, only such defect in the contract, that concurrently affects the disposition, as a vitium reale is capable of invalidating the transfer, i.e. it is void ab initio. Therefore, it is often termed that 'a good disposition is capable of saving a bad contract' because property continues to be owned by the disponee irrespective of the failure of the causa.

Vice of consent

Where the defect is not one which prevents the actual giving of consent as a vitium reale (or real vice), it may still be voidable as a vice of consent. The common vices of consent are:

===== Force and fear =====
Generally, only robbery creates a real vice (or vitium reale). Any other form of force or fear that induces a transfer of property is said to be a vice of consent.

===== Fraud =====
The fraud must have induced the transfer itself to be a vice of consent. Fraud is not a real vice (or vitium reale). If the property has been subsequently transferred to a new owner (example: B defrauds A in order to induce the transfer of property, B then sells the property to C) then the third party owner (e.g. C) is entitled to keep the property and it cannot be recovered physically. False misrepresentation is treated as a vice of consent alone.

===== Error =====
Certain errors in Roman law were capable of being a vitium reale while other errors were only capable of being a vice of consent. Following Morrisson v Robertson, errors as to the identity of the disponee is transferring (termed an error in persona) are considered to be a vitium reale. Other forms of error have no express legal authority in Scots law so are subject to academic debate.

===== Theft =====
Theft is a vitium reale and any purported transfers by way of theft are void.

==== Absolutely good, void and voidable transfers ====
Accordingly, a transfer of ownership of property can therefore be (1) absolutely good, (2) void or (3) voidable based on either the absence or existence of a vitium reale or vice of consent, or where the disponer lacks or does not lack transactional capacity.

(1) An absolutely good transfer will give the disponee (or buyer) an absolutely good title. This means that an owner with absolutely good title will be immune from challenge of his/her ownership.

(2) A void title is one where the ostensible (i.e. the apparent) owner has no legal basis for ownership. A void voluntary transfer commonly occurs where the disponer (i.e. the seller) has no ownership of the property sold or he lacks transactional capacity and has transferred the property to the disponee (i.e. the buyer). The term void transfer can be characterised as a void ab initio (i.e. void from the beginning) and is null and no effect. The effect of a transfer or other act that is void with null and no effect can be explained as if the documents of the transfer were blank pieces of paper. These occur where there is a vitium reale (real vice).

(3) A voidable transfer results in the disponee (typically a buyer or receiver of a gift, a donee) obtaining a valid title, a subsistent title, to the property but this title can be defeated by challenge in court, i.e. it can be reduced (judicially terminated by court order), by someone of a better legal claim to the property. This arises typically where there is a vice of consent.

=== Publicity principle ===
A large feature of Scots property law is the publicity principle and the legal doctrine surrounding it. The publicity principle requires that in transfers of all property there is a need for an external (i.e. public) act in order to create or transfer real rights. In Scots law, the publicity principle has not been analysed in great detail. However, the Scottish Law Commission have noted that the reliance on the public register provides certainty and security for the parties engaging the sale of land.

The rationale for the requirement of an external act is subject to academic debate but broadly is recognised that the publicity principle serves the purposes of (1) providing legal certainty of ownership without reliance on litigation, (2) securing an owner's real right by way of reference to a recorded public act or (3) protects third parties who may be unaware of any private agreements that an owner may be subject to.

==== Land registration and the race to the registers ====
Where real rights relate to land, a process known as land registration must be completed in order to validly create a real right, following the publicity principle. Historically, it was common for sellers of land to grant multiple dispositions in one piece of land, often as an attempt to defraud multiple buyers. The passage of the Registration Act 1617 by the estates of parliament of the Kingdom of Scotland was as an attempt to curtail this fraud by placing a registration requirement on transfers of ownership; allowing buyers to act on reliance of the public register when they contracted. Importantly, the Real Rights Act 1693 provided that dispositions would rank in order of the date of registration. This legal rule, still in force today under the Land Registration (Scotland) Act 2012, gives rise to the concept of the 'race to the registers' in which the disponee (commonly, the buyer following the conclusion of missives of sale) must record the disposition granted to him in the Land Register, thwarting all other potential third party claims to ownership. The race has been characterised by the distinguished judge, Lord Rodger of Earlsferry:

"a struggle in deadly earnest with the aim of destroying the other competitor's chance to obtain the real right by recording the relevant deed and infefting himself first. Those taking part in this race are no Corinthians and swear no Olympic oath of sportsmanship. If your opponent is slow off the mark, mistakes the way or stumbles, you do not chivalrously wait for him to catch up: you take full advantage of his mistakes. Nice guys finish last and don't get the real right."

In practice today, the introduction of advance notices under the Land Registration (Scotland) Act 2012 has reduced the risk of third parties thwarting an applicant's disposition in the race to the Land Register. However, it still remains valid that only registration in the Land Register is capable of transferring or creating real rights.

The above three principles together create three stages of transfer:

1. the causa traditionis - missives, contract, deed of liferent, etc.
2. the disposition - delivery (corporeal moveables), delivery of deed of disposition, deed of assignation, or lease document (heritage, assignation, lease)
3. the public act - possession (short lease, gift, excambion), registration (long lease, sale), intimation to the debtor (assignation)

All three steps must be fulfilled in order to validly transfer real rights in Scots law.

== Classification of property in Scots law ==
Distinctions are also made when classifying property, the 'things' (in Latin: res) in which real rights have been created. This creates classes of property with different respective legal rules governing each class of property. There are two distinctions that are made in Scots law:

1. The distinction between corporeal and incorporeal property.
2. The distinction between moveable and heritable property.

=== Distinction between corporeal and incorporeal property ===
This distinction existed in Roman law, it divides property (things) between:

1. Property which can be seen physically (corpus) corporeal property, (e.g. a house, a piece of land, a car, a chair, etc.); and
2. Property which cannot be seen physically is known as incorporeal property (e.g. a right to payment under a contract, a lease in a house, a right in delict for payment for damages, copyright, etc.).

=== Distinction between heritable and moveable property ===
This distinction separates property between:

1) Heritable (also termed 'immoveable'), which is land and the buildings and structures upon it; and

2) Moveable property is property which can be physically moved. Bell, the institutional writer, defines moveables as: "Whatever moves, or is capable of being moved from place to place without injury or change of nature in itself, or in the subject with which it is connected, is moveable"

The distinction between moveable and heritable can be difficult when dealing with corporeal property, such as where corporeal moveable property (e.g. a factory machine, shelves, fixtures & fittings, etc.) has been affixed to the building around it (which is heritable property). In this situation, the law of accession must apply to determine whether the moveable property has acceded to (i.e. become part of) the heritable property. The distinction between heritable and moveable property is also important in relation to insolvency and diligence law and succession and inheritance law in Scotland, as different rules apply to each class.

All property belongs to one of each distinction, resulting in four classes of property in Scots law, each with their own specific rules, these are:

- Corporeal heritable property (e.g. land, building, apartment, etc.)
- Incorporeal heritable property (e.g. a lease, a right in a contract for sale of a house, a liferent, etc.)
- Corporeal moveable property (e.g. furniture, car, books, etc.)
- Incorporeal moveable property (e.g. intellectual property rights, rights of payment arising from contract or delict, etc.)

=== Objects which cannot be owned or transferred ===
Some objects are incapable of ownership, this includes running water (i.e. the water itself, not the riverbed (alveus) or other physical land in which water is stored above it) which is capable of ownership and air. Incorporeal property (such as a lease) may be untransferable, or inalienable, because of a contractual term creating a deluctus personae (a right to select the person who performs the obligation) in order to limit who may hold the contractual right.

== Ownerless property ==
Within the inter regalia, It is recognised that the Crown has two rights to ownerless property in Scots law. This occurs where the property is ownerless (or res nullius). These are:

=== Bona vacantia ===
Under Scots law, ownerless property is classed as bona vacantia (lit. ‘vacant goods’), and falls into the ownership of the Crown. Other jurisdictions employ similar concepts of ownerless property, see bona vacantia. This is because the Scots law adoption of the principle that quod nullius est fit domini regis ("that which belongs to nobody becomes our lord the king's [or queen's]"). As part of the regalia minora, that is, property rights which the Crown may exercise as it pleases, it may alienate these rights (i.e. transfer the property to another party).

All property (both moveable or heritable) is liable to become bona vacantia, as the Scottish Law Commission note:

‘As a result of the discarding of litter, every day Her Majesty becomes the owner of countless items such as cigarette ends, crisp packets and chewing gum.’

Moveable property is said to be abandoned after the expiration of the right of ownership by negative prescription. Heritable property cannot be abandoned because of the operation of the law of land registration.

Tasked with administering the Crown's right to ownerless or bona vacantia property is the office of the Queen's and Lord Treasurer's Remembrancer ("the QLTR"). The QTLR operates under the direction of the Scottish Ministers (Public Revenue (Scotland) Act 1833, s.2), and is based in Edinburgh at the Scottish Government's Victoria Quay Building.

The QLTR retains full discretion to "disclaim" (decline to exercise) the Crown's right to take ownership, in which case another party may instead take ownership by occupatio or positive prescription. Otherwise, the QLTR can waive the right to disclaim either expressly or by taking possession of the property. Where the Crown wishes to exercise their right, the QLTR issues a Royal Warrant – a command from the Sovereign, ordering the Keeper of the Registers of Scotland to transfer ownership to the Crown. The Keeper then issues a Deed of Gift under the Cachet Seal.

A common case in which land falls to the Crown as bona vacantia is that where it has been owned by a company which is later dissolved (typically, a factory, brownfield land, or office buildings). Here, the QLTR can disclaim the Crown's right to such company assets by written notice. Where the QLTR elects to do so, any person having an interest in the land may apply to the courts for a transfer of ownership in their favour. Otherwise original acquisition by occupatio (see above) is capable.

=== Treasure trove ===
Other jurisdictions operate a concept of treasure trove, in which certain classes of treasure, such as precious metals, found within a state's territory falls to the state. Scots law does not make such a distinction, but still classifies any treasure as bona vacantia and therefore falls to the Crown. The law of treasure trove is therefore a sub-species of bona vacantia property.

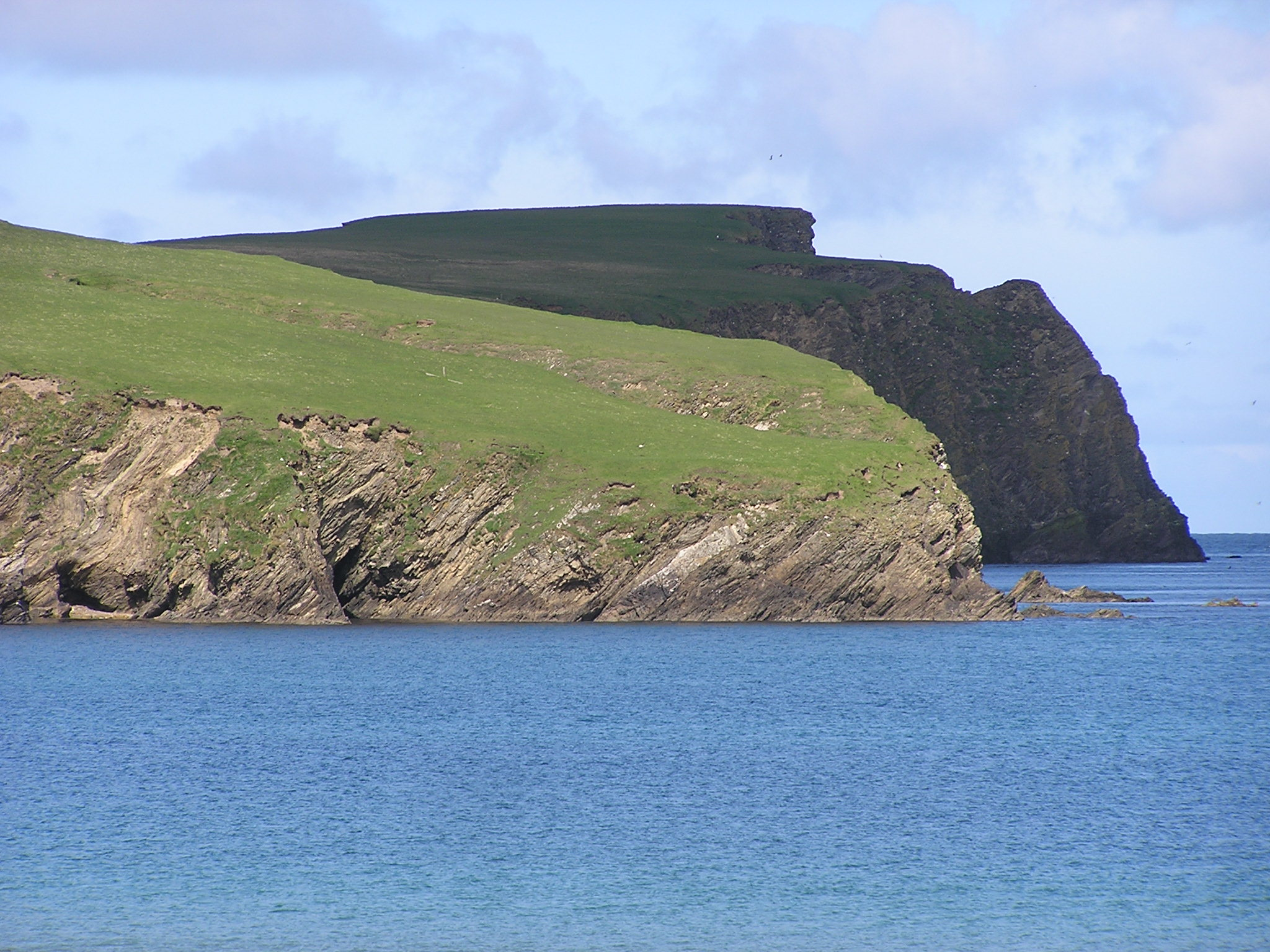
Cliffs of St. Ninian's Isle, photographed on 24 May 2006. The St. Ninian's Isle treasure, which is believed to date to about AD 800, was found on this island.

The most notable case concerning treasure trove is Lord Advocate v University of Aberdeen and Budge (1963), also known as the St Ninian's Isle treasure case.

In July 1958, a porpoise bone was found together with 28 other objects of silver alloy (12 brooches, seven bowls, a hanging bowl and other small metal work) underneath a stone slab marked with a cross on the floor of St. Ninian's Church on St. Ninian's Isle in Shetland. The objects were dated to c. AD 800. A legal dispute arose over the ownership of the objects between the Crown on the one hand, represented in Scottish courts by the Lord Advocate, and the finder (the University of Aberdeen, which had carried out the archaeological excavation) as well as the landowner, Budge. The Court of Session held that the bone should be regarded as treasure trove together with the silver objects and importantly belonged to the Crown. However, there is academic controversy surrounding this decision.

The Crown is under no legal obligation to offer any rewards for treasure trove property it has claimed. However it may accept the recommendations of the Archaeological Panel and order that the museum taking ownership of the object should make an ex gratia payment to the finder. The size of the ex gratia payment is subject to various factors, such as the value of the object, any inappropriately handling of an object, any delays in reporting the find, damage to an object, etc.

The QLTR operates a Treasure Trove Unit, in conjunction with the National Museum of Scotland (NMS) in Edinburgh to receive, process and investigate all ownerless treasure and valuable objects found in Scotland. The QLTR and NMS produce guidance and codes of practice for treasure finders. The Treasure Trove Unit (TTU) has its own website.

=== Wrecked ships ===
Another distinction of bona vacantia is made in respect of wrecked ships. Shipwrecks fall within the ambit of HM Receiver of Wrecks.

=== Ultimus haeres ===
Typically, where an individual dies without leaving a valid will (i.e. they die intestate), their estate is distributed amongst surviving relatives under the Succession (Scotland) Act 1964. However, where the deceased leaves no surviving heirs, their estate (including any land) falls to the Crown as ultimus haeres (the ultimate heir). The QLTR, in conjunction with the Procurator Fiscal Service, operates a National Ultimus Haeres Unit ("NUHU") based in Hamilton, South Lanarkshire to receive, process and investigate all unclaimed estates from individuals domiciled in Scotland. There is no limit to inheritance in Scots law, and with the developments in DNA testing, an heir to the estate will typically be found; especially with the rise of professional genealogical search companies, informally termed heir hunters. The heirs to an estate can then claim their legal right to the estate from the Crown.

== Lost property ==
Lost property is not considered truly ownerless until the passage of twenty years loss of possession by the operation of negative prescription under the Prescription and Limitation (Scotland) Act 1973. Until the passage of the prescriptive period, abandoned corporeal moveable property (corporeal heritable property [le: land] cannot be abandoned in a legal sense) can be treated as lost property, which is regulated by the Civic Government (Scotland) Act 1982. These provisions follow on from the Scottish Law Commission's Report on Lost and Abandoned Property (1980, SLC Report No 57), with the 1982 Act implementing some of the recommendations of the report.

Scots law does not follow some legal jurisdictions adoption of an automatic finders, keepers rule with corporeal heritable property (i.e. Scots law does not allow ownership of lost property to be acquired by occupatio, etc.). The 1982 Act expressly forbids any finder, including owners of land, from obtaining an automatic right of ownership in found property. Instead the 1982 Act requires the following:

=== Duties of finder ===
The 1982 Act provides that the any finder of lost property must take reasonable care and without unreasonable delay, he must deliver or report the lost property to either:

- the owner of the lost property, or
- the previous possessor of the lost property, or
- if the property has been found on land or premises, the owner or occupier of the land or premises, or
- any other person apparently having the authority to act on behalf of the above.

This does not apply to property found in:

- transport hubs (train stations, bus stations, airports, ferry terminals, etc.) if another statute provides rules for lost property in these premises.
- train stations in Scotland.
- Abandoned cars

Stray dogs are also exempt from being treated as lost property.

=== Duties of the owner/occupier of the land/premises on which property found ===
If the finder has notified or transferred possession to the owner of the land, the owner must deliver the lost property to the owner or rightful possessor. If the owner/rightful possessor of the lost property, or his agent, cannot be identified, the owner/occupier must transfer the lost property to or notify a constable of Police Scotland. This requirement extends to individuals acting on behalf of the owner/occupier. In practice, this can be done online or in-person at a police station, or by call-out to the premises using the 101 service. The owner must, if required to do so by Police Scotland, transfer the property to any individual that Police Scotland directs.

=== Criminal offence ===
Any finder of lost property who fails to comply with this procedure without reasonable excuse is liable to a criminal conviction and fine not exceeding £50.

=== Duties of the Chief Constable of Police ===
The 1982 Act imposes duties on the Chief Constable of Police Scotland in relation to lost property reported or transferred to his/her constables. These are general duties to do the following:

- The chief constable shall make such arrangements as he/she considers appropriate for the care and custody of the property.
- The chief constable shall take reasonable steps to ascertain the identity of the owner or person having right to the possession of the property and to notify him/her where it can be collected.
- The chief constable shall keep a record of particulars connected with the lost property and shall retain the record so kept for a period of one year from the date on which the property is disposed of under the 1982 Act.

=== Police power to dispose of lost property ===
Police Scotland is permitted, after the expiry of a period of 2 months from the date on which the property was delivered or its finding reported to a constable of Police Scotland, to:

- offer it to the finder, or if this is considered by the Chief Constable to be inappropriate,
- sell the lost property
- or if this is inappropriate or impracticable, dispose of it in a manner the Chief Constable thinks fit.

However, the Chief Constable in making his decision of disposal, must have regard to the whole circumstances including the nature and value of the property and the actings of the finder.

Police Scotland are also given the power to dispose of the property, in any manner the Chief Constable thinks fit, prior to the expiration of the 2-month period if the lost property cannot be kept safely or conveniently for the 2 month minimum disposal period. Any monies raised by Police Scotland in the sale of the lost property are paid to the Scottish Police Authority.

=== Return to the finder ===
Police Scotland have a discretionary power to return (or dispose of) the property to the finder, or pay him a reward sum, where the owner/rightful possessor of the lost property does not claim the property. However, the Chief Constable must take into account:

- the nature and value of the property
- the finder's actions.

If the property is returned to the finder in good faith, the effect is a transfer of the right of ownership in the property. However, the previous owner of the property has a statutory right to reclaim the property within 1 year of the disposal.

=== Return to owner/rightful possessor ===
The lost moveable property is capable of being returned to the owner/rightful possessor if a claim is made by them to Police Scotland. The claimant must satisfy Police Scotland that he/she is the owner/rightful possessor of the property. If satisfied, Police Scotland can return the property to the claimant. However, the Chief Constable is also given a discretionary power to make conditions of payment of (1) reasonable charges, including reasonable expenses incurred by Police Scotland or (2) a reward to the finder of the property. When deciding whether to impose a condition that a reward must be paid to the finder, the Chief Constable must have regard to:

- the nature and value of the property
- the actings of the finder.
- the ability of the claimant to pay such a reward.

The claimant is still permitted the right to raise court proceedings for return of the property, such as an action of vindication (rei vindicatio), see below.

=== Sale by police ===
If the lost property is sold by Police Scotland, such as by police auction, termed a roup in Scots law, compensation is recoverable to the owner (NB: this does not include a possessor). The buyer, in good faith, obtains a right of ownership in the property which cannot be challenged by the former owner. Such claims for compensation by the former owner must be made within one year of the disposal. The amount of compensation recoverable is capped at the net value of the sale, and further, compensation is only available where the net value exceeds £100, or such other amount as prescribed by secondary legislation.

=== Living creatures ===
An exception is made to the above rules for living animals, excluding stray dogs and livestock. A finder of lost living creatures (i.e. as an object of corporeal moveable property) must still follow the duties of the finder, outlined above. However, if Police Scotland allows animal to remain with the finder under its powers of disposal following notification, ownership of the living creature transfers to the finder after two months where (1) the animal has been under the continued care of the finder for two months consecutive months and (2) no claim has been made by the owner of the animal. Stray dogs taken, although not considered lost, are capable of being sold under the 1982 Act, with the buyer obtaining a valid right of ownership.

=== Appeal to sheriff ===
A claimant, finder or former owner can appeal any decision made by Police Scotland to the appropriate Sheriff Court.

=== Crown's rights in relation to lost property ===
As discussed above, the Crown has right to abandoned property under the bona vacantia. However the 1982 Act provides that any Crown rights to bona vacantia property are extinguished by the disposal of the property or living creature by Police Scotland. However, where such disposals have not occurred, the Crowns rights are unaffected and continue to apply.

== Public property in Scotland ==
=== Property owned by public sector organisations, excluding the Crown ===
Any property owned by a public sector organisation, such as a local authority, Scottish government or UK government agency or entity can be classed as public property. There are no special legal rights in public property as a matter of property law. However, the exercise of that public body's real rights, along with its other powers and duties, are subject to public and administrative law.

=== 'Common good' property ===
Within Scots property law, a special species of property is distinct from other public property in which it is held for the benefit of local inhabitants. This is known as common good property which is held within a Common Good Fund, now managed by local authorities in Scotland. A full discussion of the history of common good land by the leading expert on common good property can be found in C. Ferguson, Common Good Law (Avizandum, 2019). Common Good property is normally land (as heritable property) but can include other property such as incorporeal Common Good Funds (such as cash, real rights) or corporeal property (civic regalia such as livery collars, etc.). The Scottish Government Land Reform Review Group's The land of Scotland and the common good: report (2004) succinctly summarises common good property:

"Section 14: Common Good Lands

1. A special type of property owned by local authorities in Scotland, which is legally distinct from all the other property which they own, is Common Good Funds. These Funds are of ancient origin and consist of property that previously belonged to one of Scotland's burghs. They include both moveable property (for example, cash, securities, civic regalia) and heritable property (land and buildings). By far the largest component of Common Good Funds is heritable property and while this mainly consists of public buildings and public spaces, such as parks, it also includes in some cases farm land and other heritable property, such as salmon fishings.
2. The ownership of these Common Good Funds has undergone a series of changes as a result of local government reforms in Scotland since the Second World War. Common Good Funds were owned by 196 burghs at the time of the Local Government (Scotland) Act 1947, when the burghs became managed by Town Councils. Subsequently, when the Local Government (Scotland) Act 1973 abolished Scotland's Town Councils, legal title to Common Good Funds was transferred to the new District Councils and then, in 1996, to Scotland's current local authorities under the Local Government (Scotland) Act 1993.
3. This combined value [of common good property] is less than 1% of the value of the property assets owned by Scotland's Councils, which was reported to be £35 billion in 2011. However, the long history of Common Good lands, the locations and character of the properties and their local importance make them, as the Scottish Government has commented, " an important part of the community landscape in many places". However, as is also very clear, the legal framework governing Common Good Funds as a very distinctive component of Scotland's system of land ownership, is archaic and not fit for purpose.
4. The origins of these Common Good Funds go back to the establishment of Scotland's Royal Burghs in the 11th century. Royal charters by the Crown granted these burghs special rights and privileges, as well as tracts of land which typically extended for some distance around the medieval town. Then, in the 15th century in response to maladministration, the Scottish Parliament passed the Common Good Act 1491. This Act which remains in force today, stipulated that the common good of the Royal Burghs "be observed and kept for the common good of the town".
5. Despite that legislation, much Common Good land was lost by Scotland's burghs between then and the 1830s. Reforms at that time meant the burghs began to expand and some of the land owners who sold land to the growing towns, gifted land to the Common Good for parks and other public purposes. While there has been little research on the fate of Common Good lands between then and local government reform in the 1970s, " what is clear from even a cursory examination of the evidence is that the depredations did continue". The major re-structuring of local government in 1975, poor record keeping and the further re-organisation in 1996, have all added to the uncertainty over the full extent of the properties that are part of the Common Good, and the loss of some because they were not recognised as such."

=== Current law ===
Common good property continues to exist under the ownership of the local authorities of Scotland. The current law on common good law is found in various statutes including: the Town and Country Planning (Scotland) Act 1947, the Local Government (Scotland) Act 1973, Local Government (Scotland) Act 1994, the Community Empowerment (Scotland) Act 2015 and common law decisions. Property can be inalienable or alienable depending on the nature of the historic grant.

Under part 8 the Community Empowerment (Scotland) Act 2015, local authorities must maintain a Register of Common Good Land under section 102 of the 2015 Act and make this register available to the public in person and on the local authorities' website. A new duty to consult with community councils and other interested community groups has also been introduced under section 103 of the 2015 Act where the local authority proposes to:

(a) disposing of any common good property or (b) changing the use of any common good property.

Where the local authority does decide to dispose or appropriate alienable common good property, it can apply for an order by the local sheriff court or the Court of Session confirming its power to do so under section 75 of the Local Government (Scotland) Act 1994. A recent case on common good land and its disposal or appropriation can be found in Portobello Park Action Group Association v City of Edinburgh Council [2012] CSIH 69. In this case, the Inner House of the Court of Session affirmed that the pre-existing fiduciary duties of ownership and management of common good land in burghs continues to apply to local authorities. Inhabitants of a local authority area can bring an action against a local authority for encroachment of the public's right to use common good property, as was the case of Grahame v Magistrates of Kirkcaldy 1879 6R 1066. A full discussion of common good land by the leading expert on common good property can be found in C. Ferguson, Common Good Law (Avizandum, 2019).

=== Crown property ===
Property is capable of ownership by the Crown in a public capacity and private capacity. Public Crown property is held by the Crown Estate Scotland, following its devolution under the Scotland Act 2016. Private Crown property is owned by the Sovereign personally, and includes property such as His Majesty's private residences in Scotland. Public Crown property includes the inter regalia rights.

== Other legal regimes relating to corporeal heritable property in Scotland ==
=== Feudal law ===
Feudalism had been the system of corporeal heritable property ownership in Scots law for 800 years from the Davidian Revolution until the commencement of the Abolition of Feudal Tenure (Scotland) Act 2000.

==== Operation of the feudal system ====
Feudal tenure operated by vesting the ownership of all land in Scotland in the Crown (i.e. The King/Queen of Scots). The Crown could make feudal grants of land vesting ownership in a Crown vassal. In Scotland, crown vassals could be given "the highest and most privileged tenure of land known to the Scottish Feudal System" , a Barony title, with the ability of the holder to be called a Baron and convene a baronial court. The Crown vassals, could then divide up their land and make further grants of land, such as by a holding called feufarm, to sub-vassals, in a process called sub-infeudation. These sub-vassals could make further grants, through sub-infeudation, to sub-sub-vassals. The sub-infeudation process could carry on indefinitely, leading to a long complex chain of ownership leading ultimately back to the Crown. Vassals had obligations to their superiors, known as reddendo, which were typically monetary in nature such as the feu duty. Historically vassals could be called upon for military service under their feudal obligations, such as the wardholding until its abolishment after the Jacobite risings. Over time the most common form of feudal grants became the feufarm which carried with it the obligation pay a feuduty. Alternatively, a vassal could substitute their place in the feudal chain with another individual by a disposition.

The feudal system was starkly different from the Civilian law "bedrock" that Scots law had operated on before its introduction. The result was a hybrid of feudal/civilian law whereby:

"the granter of a feu disposition retained an interest in the property – the superiority (or dominium directum). This interest gave the granter the right to enforce conditions over the property. The grantee had the right to possess the property (or dominium utile), providing that they did not breach any of the conditions set by the granter."

One of the most important conditions in property law that a superior could make was the use of real burdens, restrictions which were placed on the use of the land. These feudal burdens are still of limited applicability under the Title Conditions (Scotland) Act 2003.

==== Feudal reform and abolition ====
Over the 800 years of its usage, feudal law was subject to various reforms limiting the powers of superiors and reforming the system in favour of the dominium utile as ownership of land became wider. In 1924, a legal commentator noted that Scots property law:

"is a law of Roman and feudal origin which has been adapted in the course of eight centuries by legislation and by judicial decisions to the needs of the Scottish people, and during the last century has, little by little, been combining with the English law by a slow operation of fusion."

By the late-20th century, the passage of the Land Tenure Reform (Scotland) Act 1974 had mitigated the payments system of dominium utile owners of feu to their feudal superior (dominium directum) in the form of a feu duty. However, around 10% of landowners in Scotland still had to make feu duty payments by 1999. This enabled feudal superiors such as the Church of Scotland, who historically were feudal superiors of large tracts of land, to receive feu duty revenue amounting to £30,000 a year. With feudalism deemed "outdated and archaic" by the new Scottish Executive, a major package of land reform (the Abolition of Feudal Tenure etc. (Scotland) Act 2000, the Title Conditions (Scotland) Act 2003 and the Tenements (Scotland) Act 2004) was passed by the newly-sitting Scottish Parliament which eliminated the feudal system. Section 1 of the 2000 Act is unequivocal:

"The feudal system of land tenure, that is to say the entire system whereby land is held by a vassal on perpetual tenure from a superior is, on the appointed day, abolished."

The 2000 Act provided that dominium utile ownership would convert into full ownership on the appointed day, and that any other feudal estate (such as superiorities or dominium directum) in Scotland would cease to exist. The appointed day was 28 November 2004, the delay between royal assent of the 2000 Act and its commencement was due to the great number of transitional arrangements needed to be put into place before feudalism's final abolition. However, on 28 November 2004, feudalism in Scotland ended and its relevance will diminish over time.

=== Shetland and Orkney Islands: udal law ===
The Northern Isles became part of Scotland as a result of two pledges for outstanding payments made by Christian I to James III of Scotland under an agreement for the marriage of Margaret, Christian I's daughter to James III in 1468 (the Orkney Isles) and 1469 (the Shetland Isles). However the Northern Isles had their own legal system, udal law, and its own system of land ownership, unlike the rest of Scotland's feudal system. Cases concerning Udal Law have been raised in the Scottish courts, and Udal law is therefore of continued relevance. The Registers of Scotland 2012 Registration Manual describes the current situation:

"Although the islands are now part of Scotland, udal law has never been formally abolished in Orkney and Shetland. In principle, it therefore still applies insofar as it has not been superseded by United Kingdom or Scots law."

Scandinavian legal systems never adopted feudalism and such had a starkly different property regime to feudal (12th century – 28 November 2004) Scots corporeal heritable property law. However, following the abolition of feudalism, discussed above, Scots law and Udal law now have much in common, sharing a similar concept of absolute (allodial) ownership. However some differences in relation to succession and land ownership do still exist so it is important to consider Udal Law where an individual owns land in the Northern Isles or dies with a Northern Isles domicile.

== See also ==
- Copyright law of the United Kingdom
- Land Reform (Scotland) Act 2003
- South African property law
