= Inter regalia (Scots law) =

The inter regalia are the rights falling to the Crown (ie: The King/Queen of Scots) in Scots property law. The term derives from Latin inter (among) and regalia (things of the king).

There are two classes of rights, divided into:

- The regalia majora (major regalia), which are inseparable from the person of the sovereign.
- The regalia minora (minor regalia), which may be conveyed to a subject.

== The regalia majora ==
The regalia majora are royal rights which cannot be alienated by the Crown. Examples are:

- the Crown's right in the sea and seabed in respect of public rights of navigation and fishing;
- the Crown's right in the foreshore in respect of public rights of navigation, mooring boats and fishing; and
- the Crown's right in the water and bed of navigable rivers, again in respect of public rights such as navigation.

== The regalia minora ==
Under feudal law, which operated in Scotland from the Davidian Revolution until 28 November 2004, all land in Scotland was originally owned by the Crown (ie: The King/Queen of Scots of the time). Certain rights in the land, called the regalia minora, could be reserved to the Crown when the Crown granted land to a Crown vassal. Today, following the abolition of feudalism, any of the regalia minora that has not been expressly granted to the owner of land through previous grant or another individual as a separate legal tenement, still remains the property of the Crown under the regalia minora.

=== Right to fish salmon ===
Termed by Gretton and Steven as the "most important legal separate tenement." Riparian (water) law is an area of Scots property law concerning the ownership of sections of rivers and their attached rights. However, despite any rights for fishing given to owners of the land under Scots riparian law, the Crown alone has the right to fish salmon. In practice, the Crown can transfer ownership, lease or license these rights to other individuals, often at high value due to the commercial interests of salmon fishing. The holder of the right of ownership in the salmon-fishing rights is treated as a separate legal owner from the owner of the land, as a separate legal tenement. Anyone fishing for salmon without permission of the owner of the tenement (ie: the salmon fishing right) commits a criminal offence under the Salmon and Freshwater Fisheries (Consolidation) (Scotland) Act 2003.

=== Right to shellfishing (mussels and oysters) ===
Historically, this right had been considered part of the regalia majora, and therefore could be exercised by the general public fishing in the territorial sea of Scotland. However, following Parker v Lord Advocate, it has been established that the right of mussel gathering and right of oyster gathering are a separate legal tenement and are the property of the Crown if not expressly granted to the owner of the mussel-bed land. The Crown's right to take mussels and right to take oysters is of continued relevance due to the commercial success of Scottish seafood. The Crown, or a subsequent owner, can transfer these rights to the owner of the mussel-bed or another individual through a disposition. There are two alternatives to this option to obtain the right: (1) Obtaining the right of ownership of the tenement (shellfishing rights) through prescriptive possession. The rationale for this tenement belonging to the Crown as regalia minora, and not held for the general public under the rights of regalia majora, appears to be due to the risks incumbent with overfishing the sea-bed.

=== Right of port ===
The Crown has the right to operate ports and ferry services as separate tenements of the land, and this right continues to be held by the Crown except where the tenement has been granted to the owners of the land. Modern ports and harbours are now largely covered by private legislation and the Harbours, Docks and Piers Clauses Act 1847 (c 27). However the underlying authority for (i.e.: the deeds of) ownership for historic ports may still be in a separate legal tenement so the right of port is of continued relevance. In a piece of land subject to a separate tenement of port, no individual is permitted to use the foreshore without paying the relevant harbour fees. Where no historic grant of port from the Crown exists, there is nothing to preclude the Owner of the land adjacent to the water operating and charging for port facilities (except where the land concerned is the foreshore as this is subject to public rights of access under the regalia majora). In practice however, aspects of maritime law regulating ports will also be required to be complied with where an individual establishes a port. However, both the separate legal tenements of the right to port and right to ferry can be acquired by an individual either by express grant from the owner of the tenement, whether the Crown or the owner of the land, or by positive prescription.

=== Right of ferry ===
The Crown has the right to operate ports and ferry services, and this right continues to be held by the Crown except where the tenement has been granted to owners of the land. The Crown's right to ferry was often granted to royal burghs, as the Crown did not have the capacity to provide these services. An example of a Crown ferry can be seen at the River Forth, where Queen Margaret established a ferry service between North & South Queensferry. While the Crown right of ferry still exists, bridges have often been constructed to replace traditional Crown ferry services, as was the case with the North & South Queensferry ferry after the opening of the Forth Road Bridge in 1964. The Scottish Government owned company Caledonian MacBrayne now operates the majority of ferry routes in Scotland. In cases of land subject to a separate tenement of ferry, no individual may carry passengers as a ferry other than the Owner, their family, guests of the Owner and employees of the Owner. Where no historic grant of port or ferry from the Crown exists, there is nothing to preclude the Owner of the land adjacent to the water operating and charging for port or ferry facilities (except where the land concerned is the foreshore as this is subject to public rights of access under the regalia majora). In practice however, aspects of maritime law regulating ferries and other water-based public transport will also be required to be complied with where an individual establishes a ferry service. However, both the separate legal tenements of the right to port and right to ferry can be acquired by an individual either by express grant from the owner of the tenement, whether the Crown or the owner of the land, or by prescriptive possession.

=== Right to mine gold and silver ===
Under the Royal Mines Act 1424, the oldest Act still in force in Scots law, the Crown reserves all rights to mine gold or silver under the inter regalia minora. Where the owner of the land does not also expressly own the tenement of mining rights, the Crown alone has the right to mine silver or gold. The owner of the land has a statutory right to obtain a grant of ownership from the Crown of the mining tenement, provided the owner pays to the Crown the value of 1/10th of all metal mined under the Mines and Metals Act 1592.

=== Right to hold fairs and markets ===
A landowner in Scotland is not entitled to hold fairs or markets without an express grant of that right from the Crown. This right is of little relevance in modern times, with fairs and markets largely being regulated in the first instance by local government statute but its status as a right of the Crown under the regalia minora and as a separate tenement continues to be valid law.

=== Petroleum and natural gas ===
Under the Petroleum Act 1998, and previously the Petroleum (Production) Act 1934, all crude oil and natural gas found in Scotland belongs to the Crown unless the right to the fuels in the strata had been expressly granted to the owner of the land.

=== Right to ownerless property ===
While not classed as capable of creating a separate legal tenement, it is recognised that the Crown has two rights to ownerless property in Scots law falling under the regalia minora. As part of the regalia minora, it may alienate these rights so that another individual can take ownership. These are:

==== Bona vacantia ====
Under Scots law, ownerless property is classed as bona vacantia (lit: vacant goods), and falls into the ownership of the Crown. Other jurisdictions employ similar concepts of ownerless property, see bona vacantia. This is because the Scots law adoption of the principle that quod nullius est fit domini regis ("that which belongs to nobody becomes our lord the king's [or queen's]").

All property (both moveable or heritable) is liable to become bona vacantia, as the Scottish Law Commission note:

"‘As a result of the discarding of litter, every day Her Majesty becomes the owner of countless items such as cigarette ends, crisp packets and chewing gum.’"

Moveable property is said to be abandoned after the expiration of the right of ownership by negative prescription. Heritable property cannot be abandoned.

Tasked with administering the Crown's right to ownerless or bona vacantia property is the office of the King's and Lord Treasurer's Remembrancer ("the KLTR"). Today the KTLR operates under the direction of the Scottish Ministers (Public Revenue (Scotland) Act 1833, s.2), and is based in Edinburgh at the Scottish Government's Victoria Quay Building.

The KTLR's website can be found at https://www.kltr.gov.uk. The KLTR retains full discretion to "disclaim" (decline to exercise) the Crown's right to take ownership, in which case another party may instead take ownership by occupatio or positive prescription. Otherwise, the KLTR can waive the right to disclaim either expressly or by taking possession of the property. Where the Crown wishes to exercise their right, the KLTR issues a Royal Warrant – a command from the Sovereign, ordering the Keeper of the Registers of Scotland to transfer ownership to the Crown. The Keeper then issues a Deed of Gift under the Cachet Seal.

A common case in which land falls to the Crown as bona vacantia is that where it has been owned by a company which is later dissolved (typically, a factory, brownfield land, or office buildings). Here, the KLTR can disclaim the Crown's right to such company assets by written notice. Where the KLTR elects to do so, any person having an interest in the land may apply to the courts for a transfer of ownership in their favour. Otherwise original acquisition by occupatio (see above) is capable.

==== Treasure trove ====
Other jurisdictions operate a concept of treasure trove, in which certain classes of treasure, such as precious metals, found within a state's territory falls to the state. Scots law does not make such a distinction, but still classifies any treasure as bona vacantia and therefore falls to the Crown. The law of treasure trove is therefore a sub-species of bona vacantia property.

The QLTR operates a Treasure Trove Unit, in conjunction with the National Museum of Scotland (NMS) in Edinburgh to receive, process and investigate all ownerless treasure and valuable objects found in Scotland. The QLTR and NMS produce guidance and codes of practice for treasure finders. The Treasure Trove Unit (TTU) has its own website.

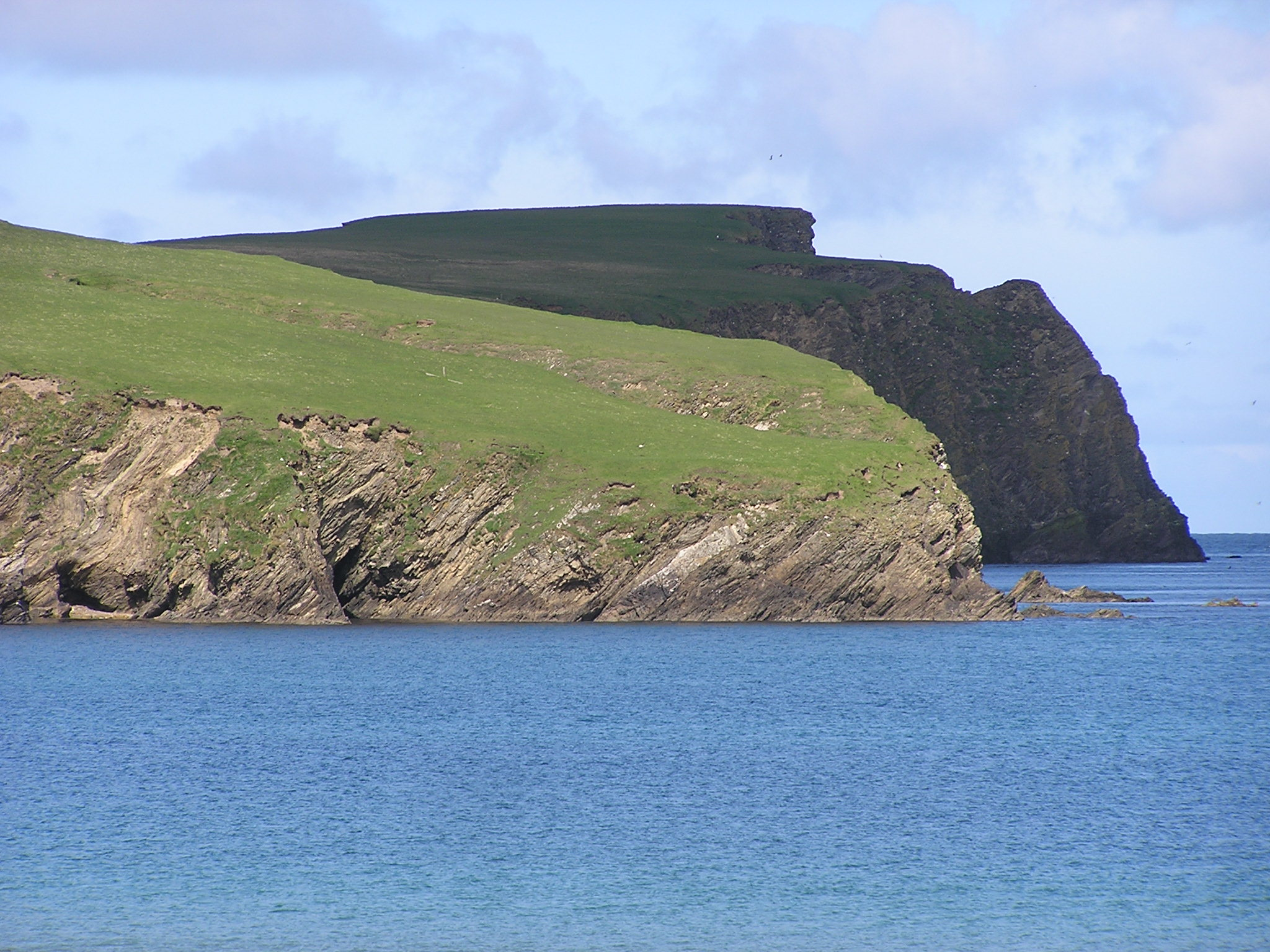
Cliffs of St. Ninian's Isle, photographed on 24 May 2006. The St. Ninian's Isle treasure, which is believed to date to about AD 800, was found on this island.

The most notable case concerning treasure trove is Lord Advocate v. University of Aberdeen and Budge (1963), also known as the St Ninian's Isle treasure case.

In July 1958, a porpoise bone was found together with 28 other objects of silver alloy (12 brooches, seven bowls, a hanging bowl and other small metal work) underneath a stone slab marked with a cross on the floor of St. Ninian's Church on St. Ninian's Isle in Shetland. The objects were dated to c. AD 800. A legal dispute arose over the ownership of the objects between the Crown on the one hand, represented in Scottish courts by the Lord Advocate, and the finder (the University of Aberdeen, which had carried out the archaeological excavation) as well as the landowner, Budge. The Court of Session held that the bone should be regarded as treasure trove together with the silver objects and importantly belonged to the Crown. However, there is academic controversy surrounding this decision.

The Crown is under no legal obligation to offer any rewards for treasure trove property it has claimed. However it may accept the recommendations of the Archaeological Panel and order that the museum taking ownership of the object should make an ex gratia payment to the finder. The size of the ex gratia payment is subject to various factors, such as the value of the object, any inappropriately handling of an object, any delays in reporting the find, damage to an object etc.

==== Wrecked ships ====
Another distinction of bona vacantia is made in respect of wrecked ships. Shipwrecks fall instead to HM Receiver of Wrecks.

==== Ultimus haeres ====
Typically, where an individual dies without leaving a valid will, (i.e.: they die intestate) their estate is distributed amongst surviving relatives under the Succession (Scotland) Act 1964. However, where the deceased leaves no surviving heirs, their estate (including any land) falls to the Crown as ultimus haeres (the ultimate heir). The KLTR, in conjunction with the Procurator Fiscal Service, operates a National Ultimus Haeres Unit ("NUHU") based in Hamilton, South Lanarkshire to receive, process and investigate all unclaimed estates from individuals domiciled in Scotland. There is no limit to inheritance in Scots law, and with the developments in DNA testing, an heir to the estate will typically be found; especially with the rise of professional genealogical search companies, informally termed heir hunters. The heirs to an estate can then claim their legal right to the estate from the Crown. Any unclaimed estates after an exhaustive search are claimed by the Crown and the claimed estate is paid into the Scottish Consolidated Fund.

== Historical regalia minora rights ==
Historically, the following rights were considered part of the regalia minora but are now not considered so:

- The right to fish for white fish
- The right to hunt for deer
- The right to kill swans
- The right to the fortalices and castles of Scotland and the right to build fortalices and castles.

== See also ==
- Monarchs of Scotland
- Scots property law
- Crown Estate Scotland
