= Occupatio (Scots law) =

Occupatio or occupation is a method of original acquisition of property in Scots law. It derives from the Roman law concept of the same name. Occupatio allows an occupier of an object (res) with the intention to own the property to become the owner. As most property in Scotland is owned, and with the caduciary right (or escheat) that all ownerless property falls to the Crown, its application is uncommon. Nevertheless, it remains a valid method of acquiring ownership in Scots law.

== Roman law ==
In Roman law, occupatio was an original method of acquiring ownership of un-owned property (res nullius) by occupying with intent to own. Nicholas argues this is the "archetype" of all other Roman law methods of original acquisition. According to the Roman jurist Gaius, any previously unowned thing becomes the just property of the first occupant able to "capture" it:

§ 66. Another title of natural reason, besides Tradition, is Occupation [occupatio], whereby things previously the property of no one become the property of the first occupant, as the wild inhabitants of earth, air, and water, as soon as they are captured.

§ 67. For wild beasts, birds, and fishes, as soon as they are captured, become, by natural law, the property of the captor, but only continue such so long as they continue in his power; after breaking from his custody and recovering their natural liberty, they may become the property of the next occupant; for the ownership of the first captor is terminated. Their natural liberty is deemed to be recovered when they have escaped from his sight, or, though they continue in his sight, when they are difficult to recapture.

Abandoned goods (res derelictae) was also res nullius and subject to acquirement through occupatio.

== Application in Scots law ==
=== Original acquisition ===
In original acquisition, the new owner is first person to take ownership (i.e. acquire) of the ownerless thing (res nullius). The law of original acquisition is strictly applied, and an original acquisition will only occur in a few specific situations, including acquisition by occupatio. The Crown's role as ultimus haeres and recipient of any bona vacantia (i.e. abandoned) property in Scotland means that acquisition of previously unowned property is uncommon but occupatio remains a valid method to acquire ownership.

==== Ownerless things capable of occupatio acquisition ====
The following things (res nullius) were considered capable of acquisition by occupatio:

===== Occupatio of shells, pearls, gems, pebbles or precious stones on the seashore =====
The above items were considered by the institutional writer Erskine to be res nullius capable of acquisition by occupatio. In Scotland, the foreshore is owned by the Crown as part of the inter-regalia.

===== Occupatio of wild animals =====
Acquisition of the wild animal with the intent to own it vests the occupier or holder a real right of ownership. This is said to apply irrespective of whether the property has been taken from another person's land. This is because the landowner has no right of ownership in the unowned thing itself, only a right to take. Therefore, wild animals (ferae naturae) which are not tame or domesticated animals, or salmon fish, are capable of being acquired by occupatio to give the taker a right of ownership. If the wild animal frees itself from the occupier, the animal is considered wild or ferae naturae again. Animals which return to their owner, such as bees or pigeons, are not considered ferae naturae.

However in practice, the poacher will lose ownership of the wild animal as a matter of forfeiture for committing a criminal offence. This is because poaching and other forms of theft are a criminal offence for the taking of wild animals without an owner's consent, such as Part III of the Deer Scotland Act 1996. Specific criminal offences in relation to types of Scottish wild animals are found in the Wildlife and Natural Environment (Scotland) Act 2011 and the Wildlife and Countryside Act 1981. Additionally, the criminal courts of Scotland also have a general power under the Proceeds of Crime Act 2002 to order the forfeiture and sale of the captured wild animal.

Wild Salmon fish belong to the Crown and therefore form part of the inter regalia, so are excluded from acquisition by occupatio. Similarly, escaped farmed fish are not considered ferae naturae so are not capable of occupatio acquisition.
