= Occupatio =

Method of acquiring property

Occupatio (occupation) was an original method of acquiring ownership of un-owned property (res nullius) by occupying with intent to own.

== Roman legal writings on acquisition by occupatio ==
Nicholas argues this is the "archetype" of all other Roman law methods of original acquisition. According to the Roman jurist Gaius, any previously unowned thing becomes the just property of the first occupant able to "capture" it:

§ 66. Another title of natural reason, besides Tradition, is Occupation [occupatio], whereby things previously the property of no one become the property of the first occupant, as the wild inhabitants of earth, air, and water, as soon as they are captured.

§ 67. For wild beasts, birds, and fishes, as soon as they are captured, become, by natural law, the property of the captor, but only continue such so long as they continue in his power; after breaking from his custody and recovering their natural liberty, they may become the property of the next occupant; for the ownership of the first captor is terminated. Their natural liberty is deemed to be recovered when they have escaped from his sight, or, though they continue in his sight, when they are difficult to recapture.

Abandoned goods (res derelictae) was also res nullius and subject to acquirement through occupatio. Land, however, was excluded and could not be acquired using occupatio.

== Occupatio in the modern world ==
The Roman law occupatio has continued relevance in present times, partly due to its adoption by legal systems across Europe, Africa and North America. It is also used in international law.

=== Domestic legal systems ===
Legal systems across the modern world continue to employ a form of occupatio. A full discussion of each legal system is outside the scope of this article, see: South African property law, civilian property law, Scots Law, Occupatio (Scots law).

=== International law ===
International law adopts much of Roman property law in regards to acquisition of sovereignty due to the European nature of early European discovery voyages such as Christopher Columbus. Occupatio was later employed under public international law as the basis of acquisition of states ownership of vacant territory (often including land already possessed by indigenous populations). An example of occupatio under international law is the United Kingdom's acquisition of ownership of Rockall in the North Atlantic Ocean by the Island of Rockall Act 1972.

== See also ==
- Adverse possession
- Usucapio
- Homestead principle
- Squatting
- Terra nullius
- Acquisition of Sovereignty
