= Lord Advocate v University of Aberdeen and Budge =

Lord Advocate v University of Aberdeen and Budge (1963 CSIH 1) is a Scots property law case about treasure trove, in which the Court of Session held that treasure trove is bona vacantia, and therefore belongs to the Crown.

== Background ==
St Ninian's Isle is a small tied island off the cost of Mainland, Shetland, connected by a tombolo. In 1955, a University of Aberdeen archeology team started excavating the Isle, trying to locate ruins of a medieval church. The excavation was taking place with the consent of the landowner, Mr Budge. In 1958, the team found several artifacts, including a porpoise bone and some objects made of silver alloy. A question arose whether the treasure, named "St Ninian's Isle Treasure", was owned by the Crown or the University and Mr Budge.

== Decision ==
In the Outer House of the Court of Session, the Lord Ordinary decided in favour of the Crown. The University appealed to the Inner House. The Inner House upheld the Lord Ordinary's decision.
