= Ultimus =

Ultimus may refer to:

- Ultimus haeres, a concept in Scots law
- Ultimus Romanorum, Latin for Last of the Romans
- Ultimus, a Kree villain that appears in the Marvel Universe
