= Sicaricon =

Obsolete Jewish legal term

Sicaricon (Hebrew: סיקריקון), lit. 'usurping occupant; possessor of confiscated property; the law concerning the purchase of confiscated property' (now obsolete), refers in Jewish law to a former act and counter-measure meant to deal effectively with religious persecution against Jews in which the Roman government had permitted its own citizens to seize the property of Jewish landowners who were either absent or killed in war, or taken captive, or else where Roman citizens had received property (real estate) that had been confiscated by the state in the laws prescribed under ager publicus, and to which the original Jewish owners of such property had not incurred any legal debt or fine, but had simply been the victims of war and the illegal, governmental expropriation of such lands from their rightful owners or heirs. The original Jewish law, made at some time after the First Jewish-Roman War with Vespasian and his son Titus, saw additional amendments by later rabbinic courts, all of which were meant to safe-guard against depriving the original landowners and their heirs of any land that belonged to them, and to ensure their ability to redeem such property in the future.

== Etymology ==
The origin of the word sicaricon is now obscure. The word is believed by some to be a corruption of Koine Greek: χαισαρίχιον, or what is called in Latin caesaricium. Others, namely, Heinrich Graetz and Moses Samuel Zuckermandl, thought the word was derived from Sicarii, a group associated with murders, brigandage and robbery during the Second Temple period. Hai ben Sherira also thought that the word Sicarii refers to government personnel involved with implementing the laws of Sicaricon. However, the Sicarii are largely mentioned with assassinations and there is no historical evidence to connect them with the expropriation of land. Nathan ben Jehiel said that the word is merely a Hebrew abbreviation for Hebrew: שא קרקעי והניחני="Take my land but leave me alone", a view supported by Talmudic exegetes, Rashi and Solomon Sirilio. Isaac ben Melchizedek, echoing the same view, held that sicaricon were hired "hitmen," sent to embezzle the original landowner of his property at the threat of death. In any case, the word invariably refers to a Roman or foreign molester who expropriates land from its Jewish owner, usually by a decree made by a tyrant king (Caesar).

== Status of sicaricon during the war ==
During the height of the Jewish war with Rome, and especially after Caesar (Vespasian) had given order that all Judea should be exposed to sale (The Jewish War, VII.6.6 [VII, 216]; 5:421), the law of "the usurping occupant" did not apply to cases where the Jewish landowner in Judea was compelled to relinquish his property to a Roman tenant (usually a farmer) or to face death. Several reasons are given for this, one of which being that the Roman authority had given license to kill Jewish property owners during the war, and therefore, to avoid death, the Jewish landowner was seen as willingly disposing of such property in order to save his own life. Such transactions in Jewish law were deemed as valid, since one's intent under such pressure is real and without pretense. In yet other instances, some Jewish landowners never despaired of retrieving their stolen property, so that whenever the sicaricon took away their field and sold it to another, the original landowners would come along and forcibly take it away from those to whom it had been sold, until at length no one dared buy from the sicaricon for fear of being confronted by the original property owners, leaving the entire country of Judea in the hands of the sicaricon and seemingly irredeemable. of peacetime. According to the Tosefta (Gittin 3:10 [5:1]), during the war with Rome, the special Sicaricon law concerning the annulment of Jewish ownership of confiscated Jewish property was not invoked in Judea. Instead, the original Torah laws remained in effect, and a Jew who bought land from the conqueror that had been taken by force from its original Jewish owners did not have to worry about returning it to its original owners or compensating them. This ensured that the country would be continuously populated.

== First enactment ==
After the war, and in those cases where the Israelite owners were slain in battle, the rabbinic court in Israel began to apply the laws of "usurping occupant," since no longer did the Roman authority give licence to kill Jewish property owners, while the heirs of such property were, in turn, no longer fearful of being killed and could seek legal redress for the restoration of such property. This enactment was also made to ensure the continued Jewish settlement in the towns and cities across Judea, a country then largely occupied by the sicaricon. Any prospective buyer of such expropriated land was first required, by rabbinic edict, to gain the willful consent of the land's original owner, or of his heirs, before he could legally purchase the field held by a sicaricon. The original Jewish owner, or his heirs, retained the right of first refusal. In so doing, the buyer did not appear to give a semblance of legitimacy to the Roman law. However, had he bypassed the original landowner and broached the issue of buying the property first with the "usurping occupant," even if the original landowner should later give to him his consent, the transaction is considered null and void and can be challenged by the original owner in a court of law, who can claim that he only gave his consent to satisfy the usurping occupant, but in reality he was never pleased with the sale. Primacy is given to the original landowner to reclaim such property, or at least to give his consent to the sale of property held by the sicaricon before it is reclaimed by another.

If, however, the original owner or heirs were never consulted about selling their property and the buyer made the transaction between himself and the sicaricon alone, yet the usurping occupant gave to the original owner the payment which he received from the buyer, and the original owner accepted it, the transaction is deemed as valid. Likewise, if the field in question was seized in consequence of a debt or fine by its original owner (insolvency), or as payment for damages, the current holder of the field cannot be divested of his property. The laws concerning sicaricon did not apply to chattels (movable property).

== Second enactment ==
The first enactment was later amended to better ensure compensation to the original owners or heirs of the field. The new enactment required that any prospective buyer of a field known to have been confiscated and held by a "usurping occupant" after the first Jewish-Roman war must, upon purchasing the field, give to the original owner of the property (or to his heirs) either a quarter of the land that is reclaimed, or else one-third of the purchasing price. According to Ha-Meiri, this is made payable by giving to its original owner 100 for a field that is offered by the "usurping occupant" at 300; one-hundred being one-third of 300, and one-fourth the original cost of the field before its depreciation. The original owner may accept either money or land at the said rate of compensation. This enactment was made in consideration of the fact that the sicaricon (usurping occupant) had presumably depreciated the value of the real-estate to the value of three-fourths of its original cost, since he had obtained the field without cost and would incur no loss had he sold the field at a bargain price. This rule applies when the original owner or heirs are in no position to buy the field for themselves, which if they were, they would have the right of preemption. For example, if a field was sold by the sicaricon at thirty denarii, the purchaser must give ten denarii in remittance to the original owner or heirs of the field, since it is generally assumed that the value of the field was originally appraised at forty denarii.

== Third and final enactment ==
In the days of Rabbi Judah HaNasi (others say, in the days of Rabbi Yehoshua), the rabbis convened a court where it was decided by vote that any man could secure the title to a field held by a sicaricon (usurping occupant) after the field had been in the possession of the "usurping occupant" for at least twelve months without it being redeemed by its original owner, provided that he gives a quarter of the purchased field or the monetary equivalent of one-third the cost of purchase unto its original owner or heirs. This enactment is believed to have been the result of certain decrees made by Pertinax and which affected all territories falling under Roman suzerainty, including Judea. The novelty of Judah HaNasi's enactment is that after twelve months, no longer would it require the consent of the original land owner to buy a field held by a sicaricon. If the sicaricon agrees to sell the field, a quarter of the field or else one-third of its purchasing cost must be given by its buyer to the original owner.

Scholars have pointed out that the very need of the rabbis to annul these Roman laws suggests that the country of Judea in the 2nd-century CE was still largely inhabited and settled by its Jewish citizens. Each of these enactments are cases in antiquity where legislators have enacted countervailing statutes to ensure the preservation and keeping of their own ancient laws and polity.

== See also ==
- Ager publicus
- Confiscation
- Ius in re
- Mosaic of Rehob
- Ottoman Land Code of 1858
- Res derelictae
- Usucapio
- Usucaption
