= Royal Mines Act 1424 =

Scottish parliamentary act regarding gold and silver mine ownership

- Act of Parliament
- Parliament of Scotland
- Long title: Of mynis of golde and silver.
- Citation: c. 13 [12mo ed: c. 12]

Dates
- Royal assent: 26 May 1424

Status: Current legislation

Text of the Royal Mines Act 1424 as in force today (including any amendments) within the United Kingdom, from legislation.gov.uk.

The Royal Mines Act 1424 (c. 13) was an act of the Parliament of Scotland stating that gold and silver mines containing ore above a certain value would belong to the king.

This made such mines inter regalia under Scots law (that is, property belonging to the sovereign), and by the phrasing of the act lead mines were also included when the ore from those mines produced the requisite amount of silver.

The effects of this act were negated by the Mines and Metals Act 1592 (1592 c. 31), which dissolved mines from the sovereign but did not change their status as inter regalia.

The act in its entirety is as follows:

Item gif ony myne of golde or siluer be fundyn in ony lordis landis of the realme and it may be prowyt that three halfpennys of siluer may be fynit owt of the punde of leide The lordis of parliament consentis that sik myne be the kingis as is vsuale in vthir realmys

or in modern English:

Item, of any gold and silver mines that are found in any lord's lands of the realm, and it may be proved that three halfpennies may be refined of silver from a pound of lead, the lords of the parliament consent that such mines shall be the king's, as is the custom in other realms.

The act was passed by the Parliament at Perth on 26 May 1424 in the reign of James I, and was titled "Of mynis of golde and silver".

It is the oldest act of any parliament in the British Isles that has not been amended or repealed in any part.

== See also ==
- Leadhills
