= Res communis =

Concept from Roman law

Res communis is a concept or doctrine. The expression is a Latin term derived from Roman law that preceded today's concepts of the commons and common heritage of mankind. It has relevance in international law and common law.

In the 6th century, the Institutes of Justinian codified the relevant Roman law as: "By the law of nature these things are common to mankind – the air, running water, the sea, and consequently the shores of the sea."

Res communis has gained new currency in environmental law, in terms of managing natural resources. The key concept is that the state is the trustee of communal natural resources and cannot alienate them into private ownership. Examples are Lake Michigan, Victoria Harbour in Hong Kong and Sydney Harbour.

Biological examples of res communis include fish and mammals in high seas. Rules for use of the continent Antarctica were based on res communis as was development of space law.

== See also ==
- Res extra commercium
- Res nullius
