= Res derelictae =

Principle in Roman property law

In Roman law, res derelictae referred to property voluntarily abandoned by the owner. The dominant strand of legal thought under the Roman Empire held it to be a form of res nullius, or "un-owned" property, but it was necessary to establish that it had been voluntarily abandoned. The opposite was res mancipi, or "owned" property.

== See also ==
- Res communis
- Sicaricon
