= Res nullius =

Latin term from Roman law

Res nullius is a term of Roman law meaning "things belonging to no one"; that is, property not yet the object of rights of any specific subject. A person can assume ownership of res nullius simply by taking possession of it (occupatio). However, in ancient Rome, certain forms of res nullius could never be owned (res extra commercium) because they were considered to belong either in common to all or to the divine rather than human dominium. The use of res nullius as a legal concept continues in modern civil legal systems.

Examples of res nullius are wild animals (ferae naturae) or abandoned property (res derelictae). Finding can also be a means of occupatio (i.e. vesting ownership), since a thing completely lost or abandoned is res nullius, and therefore belonged to the first taker. Specific legislation may be made, e.g. for beachcombing.

== Scope ==
=== Wild animals ===
In common law legal systems, forest laws, and game laws have specified which animals are res nullius and when they become someone's property. Wild animals are regarded as res nullius, and as not being the subject of private property until reduced into possession by being killed or captured (see, e.g. Pierson v. Post):

A bird in the hand is owned; a bird in the bush is not.

Even bees do not become property until hived. An exception in the United Kingdom is the mute swan: The U.K. Monarch retains the right to assert ownership of unmarked mute swans, which he currently does on stretches of the Thames and its tributaries.

Likewise in common law systems, abandoned things are generally the property of the owner of the land in which they are found. Exceptions include treasure trove, for which specific law applies, generally making it Crown property; and some types of shipwreck, such as flotsam, jetsam, lagan and derelict.

=== Modern public international law ===
A concept derived from res nullius by analogy is terra nullius. Using it, a state may assert control of an unclaimed territory by occupying it.

This terra nullius principle was used to justify colonization of much of the world, as exemplified in the competition for influence within Africa by the European powers (see the scramble for Africa). The concept was applied even where there were indigenous peoples residing in what Europeans considered newly discovered land, as in Australia. It was also used by English colonists in Ireland, based on similar grounds to those used in the Americas and Australia: in the early stages of the Munster Plantation it was argued that much of Ireland was res nullius as the Gaelic Irish were "not thrifty, and civil and human creatures, but rather savage and brute beasts." (Anthony Trollope) Much of the native population had been killed during the Desmond Rebellions, and Irish land use was seen as inefficient, based mostly on pastoralism; thus, land could be claimed as res nullius and planted with English, Welsh and Scottish colonists. It was also used with regard to plantation of the Ards Peninsula.

== See also ==
- Unowned property
- Hefker
