= Treasure trove =

Hidden store of valuables

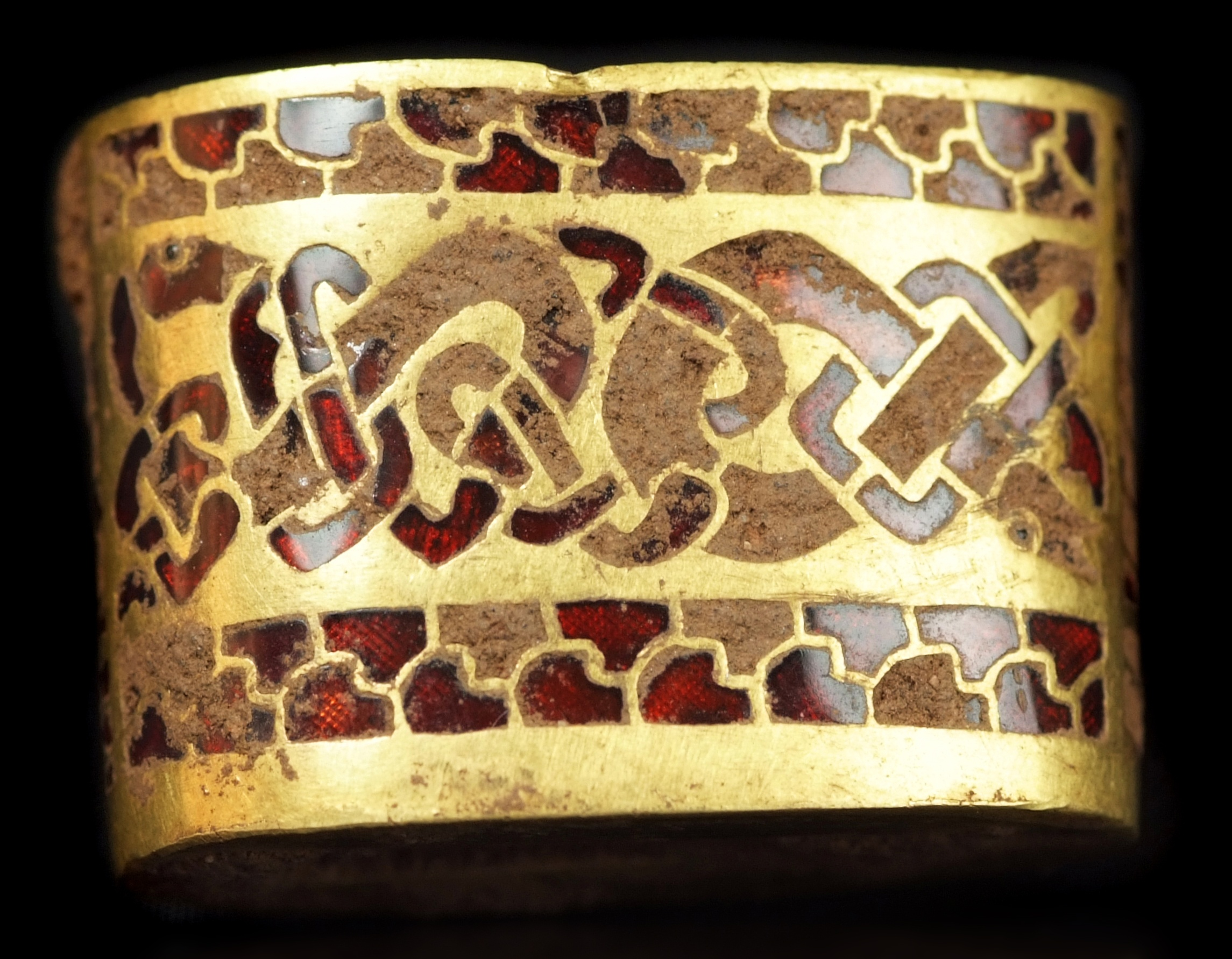
A hilt fitting from the Staffordshire hoard, which was declared to be treasure in September 2009

A treasure trove is an amount of money or coin, gold, silver, plate, or bullion found hidden underground or in places such as cellars or attics, where the treasure seems old enough for it to be presumed that the true owner is dead and the heirs undiscoverable. An archaeological find of treasure trove is known as a hoard. The legal definition of what constitutes treasure trove and its treatment under law vary considerably from country to country, and from era to era.

The term is also often used metaphorically. Collections of articles published as a book are often titled Treasure Trove, as in A Treasure Trove of Science. This was especially fashionable for titles of children's books in the early- and mid-20th century.

== Terminology ==
Treasure trove, sometimes rendered treasure-trove, literally means "treasure that has been found". The English term treasure trove was derived from tresor trové, the Anglo-French equivalent of the Latin legal term thesaurus inventus. In 15th-century English the Anglo-French term was translated as "treasure found", but from the 16th century it began appearing in its modern form with the French word trové anglicized as trovey, trouve or trove. The term wealth deposit has been proposed as a more accurate alternative.

The term treasure trove is often used metaphorically to mean a "valuable find", and hence a source of treasure, or a reserve or repository of valuable things. Trove is often used alone to refer to the concept, the word having been reanalysed as a noun via folk etymology from an original Anglo-French adjective trové (cognate to the French past participle trouvé, literally "found"). Treasure trove is therefore akin to similar Anglo-French or Anglo-French-derived legal terms whereby a post-positive adjective in a noun phrase (contrary to standard English syntax) has been reanalysed as a compound noun phrase, as in court martial, force majeure, and Princess Royal. Phrases of this form are often used either with the etymologically correct plural form (for example, "Courts-martial deal with serious offences ...") or as fully rederived plural forms (such as "... ordering court-martials ..."). In the case of treasure trove, the typical plural form is almost always treasure troves, with treasures trove found mostly in historical or literary works.

== History ==
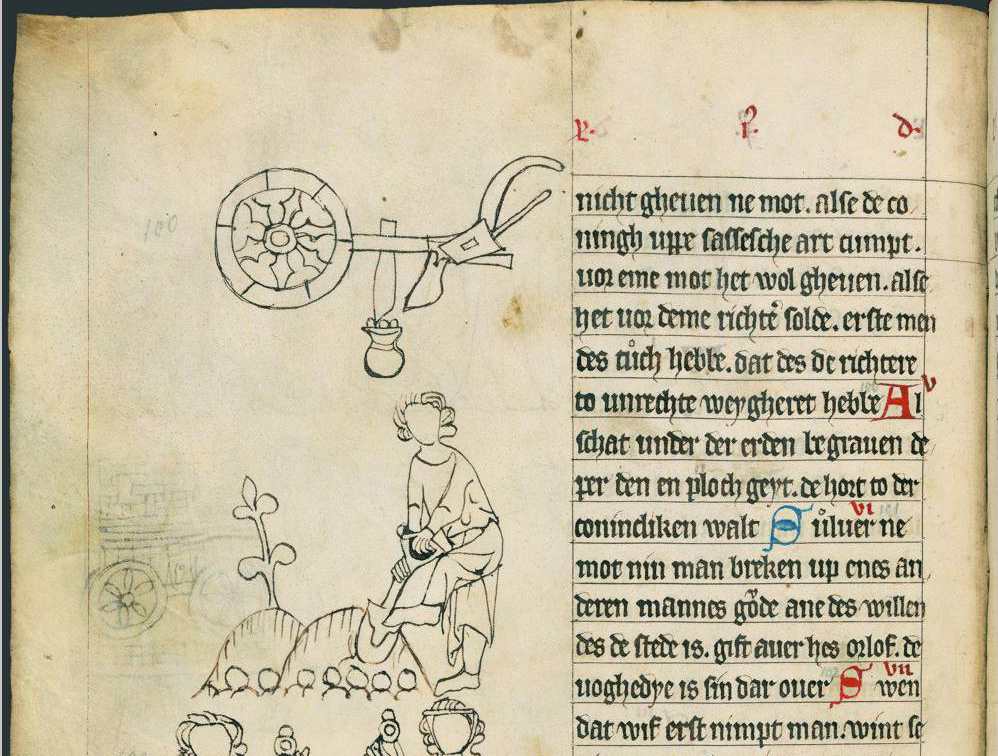
Oldenburg Sachsenspiegel of 1336 Fol. 22v detail regarding the treasure trove, starting with red initial A (Middle Low German): "Al schat under der erden berauen deper den en ploch geyt de hort to derer conicliken walt." (Everything lying deeper in the ground than the range of a plowshare, belongs to the king.)

=== Roman law ===
In Roman law, treasure trove was called thesaurus ("treasure" in Latin), and defined by the Roman jurist Paulus as "vetus quædam depositio pecuniæ, cujus non extat memoria, ut jam dominum non habeat" (an ancient deposit of money, of which no memory exists, so that it has no present owner). R. W. Lee, in his book The Elements of Roman Law (4th ed., 1956), commented that this definition was "not quite satisfactory" as treasure was not confined to money, nor was there any abandonment of ownership. Under the emperors, if treasure was found on a person's own land or on sacred or religious land, the finder was entitled to keep it. However, if the treasure was found fortuitously, and not by deliberate search, on another person's land, half went to the finder and half to the owner of the land, who might be the emperor, the fiscus (public treasury), the city, or some other proprietor. According to Dutch jurist Hugo Grotius (1583–1645), as the feudal system spread over Europe and the prince was looked on as the ultimate owner of all lands, his right to the treasure trove became jus commune et quasi gentium (a common and quasi-international right) in England, Germany, France, Spain and Denmark.

An interpretation of Roman law regarding treasure trove makes an appearance in the 13th chapter of the Gospel of Matthew. The Parable of the Hidden Treasure is told by Jesus of Nazareth to the crowds surrounding him and his disciples. In the parable, the treasure trove is hidden in a field, which is open country and anyone could conceivably discover something hidden in that location. It is also assumed that the present owner has no knowledge or memory of the treasure. The finder of the treasure concealed the discovery until he could raise capital to purchase the land. Selling all he had, the finder purchased the land and then unearthed the treasure, to which he was entitled as both finder and landowner. Jesus compared the kingdom of Heaven to the treasure, being of greater value than all a person's earthly wealth and a wise investment that not everyone understands at first.

=== England and Wales common law ===
It has been said that the concept of treasure trove in English law dates back to the time of Edward the Confessor (c. 1003/1004–1066). Under the common law, treasure trove was defined as gold or silver in any form, whether coin, plate (gold or silver vessels or utensils) or bullion (a lump of gold or silver), which had been hidden and rediscovered, and which no person could prove they owned. If the person who had hidden the treasure was known or discovered later, it belonged to him or her or persons claiming through him or her such as descendants. To be treasure trove, an object had to be substantially – that is, more than 50% – gold or silver.

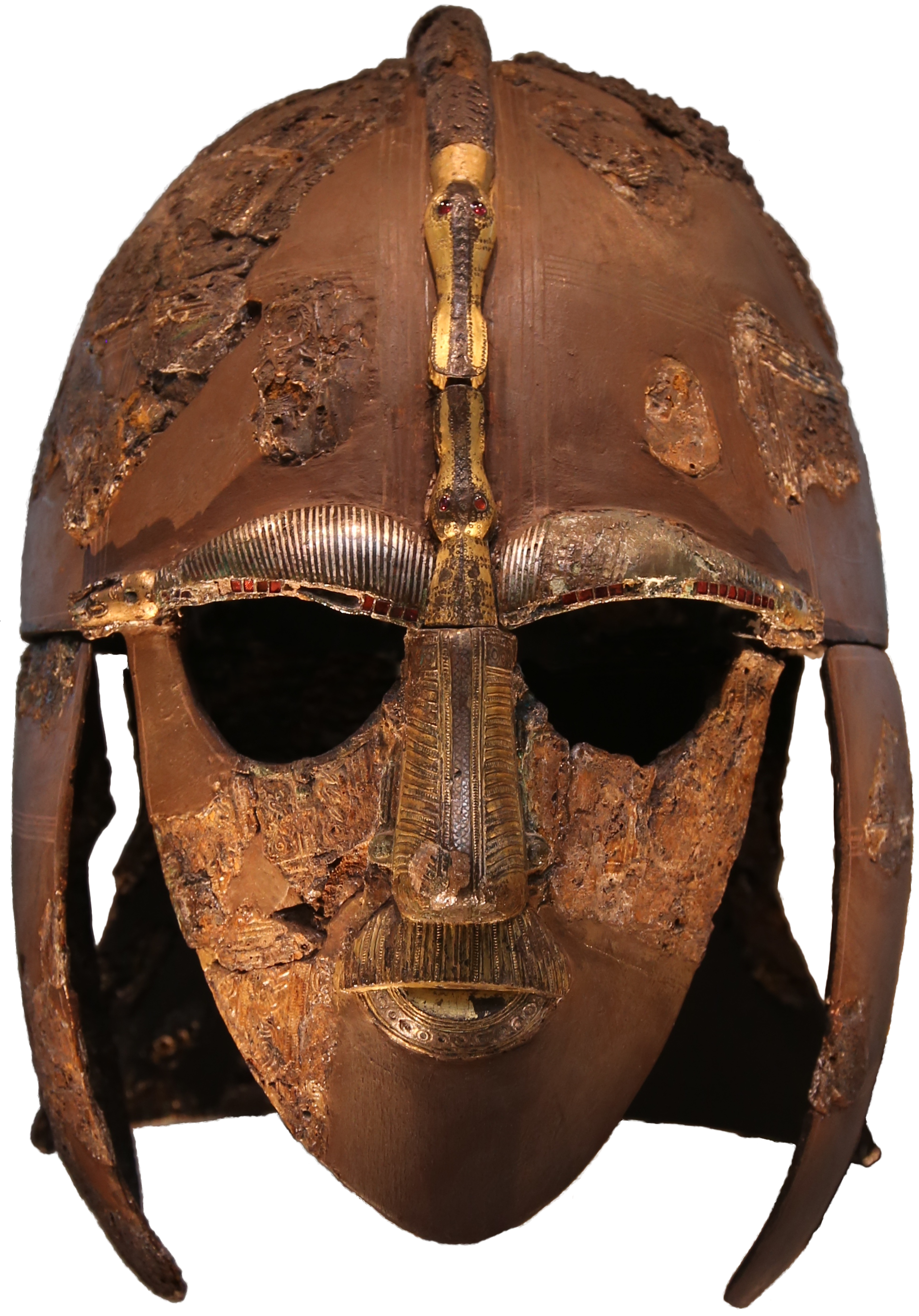
The Sutton Hoo helmet, recovered in 1939. The Sutton Hoo find was not treasure trove. As it was a ship burial, there had been no intention to recover the objects later.

Treasure trove had to be hidden with animus revocandi, that is, an intention to recover it later. If an object was simply lost or abandoned (for instance, scattered on the surface of the earth or in the sea), it belonged either to the first person who found it or to the landowner according to the law of finders, that is, legal principles concerning the finding of objects. For this reason, the objects found in 1939 at Sutton Hoo were determined not to be treasure trove; as the objects were part of a ship burial, there had been no intention to recover the buried objects later. The Crown had a prerogative right to treasure trove, and if the circumstances under which an object was found raised a prima facie presumption that it had been hidden, it belonged to the Crown unless someone else could show a better title to it. The Crown could grant its right to treasure trove to any person in the form of a franchise.

It was the duty of the finder, and indeed of anyone who had acquired knowledge of the matter, to report the finding of a potential treasure trove to the coroner of the district. Concealing a find was a misdemeanour punishable with fine and imprisonment. The coroner was required to hold an inquest with a jury to determine who were the finders or the persons suspected to be the finders, "and that may be well perceived where one liveth riotously and have done so of long time". Where there had been an apparent concealment of treasure trove the coroner's jury could investigate the title of the treasure to discover if it had been concealed from the supposed owner, but any such finding was not conclusive as the coroner generally had no jurisdiction to enquire into questions of title to the treasure between the Crown and any other claimant. If a person wished to assert title to the treasure, they had to bring separate court proceedings.

In the early 20th century, it became the practice of the Lords Commissioners of the Treasury to pay those finders who fully and promptly reported discoveries of treasure troves and handed them over to the proper authorities, the full antiquarian value of objects which were retained for national or other institutions such as museums. Objects not retained were returned to the finders.

The law regarding treasure trove was amended in 1996 so that these principles no longer hold (see § Present-day legal definitions: England, Northern Ireland, and Wales below).

=== Scottish common law ===
Under the common law of Scotland, the law of treasure trove was and still is a specialized application of the general rule governing bona vacantia ("vacant goods") – that is, objects that are lost, forgotten or abandoned. The rule is quod nullius est fit domini regis: "that which belongs to nobody becomes our Lord the King's [or Queen's]". The Crown in Scotland has a prerogative right to treasure trove for it is one of the regalia minora ("minor things of the king"), that is, property rights which the Crown may exercise as it pleases and which it may alienate (transfer to another party). As the Scottish law of treasure trove on the matter has not changed, it is discussed in the "Present-day legal definitions" section below, under the subheading "Scotland".

=== United States law ===
Many states in the US enacted statutes that received English common law into their legal systems. For example, in 1863 the legislature of Idaho enacted a statute that made "the common law of England ... the rule of decision in all courts" of the state. However, English common law principles of treasure trove were not applied in the US Instead, courts applied rules relating to the finding of lost and ownerless items. The treasure trove rule was first given serious consideration by the Oregon Supreme Court in 1904 in a case involving boys who had discovered thousands of dollars in gold coins hidden in metal cans while cleaning out a henhouse. The Court wrongly believed that the rule operated in the same way as early rules that awarded possession – and, effectively, legal title as well – to innocent finders of items that had been hidden or concealed and the owners of which were unknown. By awarding the coins to the boys, the Court implied that finders were entitled to buried valuables, and that any claims by landowners should be disregarded.

In subsequent years the legal position became unclear as a series of English and American cases decided that landowners were entitled to buried valuables. The Maine Supreme Judicial Court reconsidered the rule in 1908. The case before it involved three workers who had found coins while digging on their employer's land. The Court decided along the lines of the 1904 Oregon case and awarded the coins to the finders. For the next 30 years, the courts of a number of states, including Georgia, Indiana, Iowa, Ohio and Wisconsin, applied this modified "treasure trove" rule, most recently in 1948. Since that time, however, the rule has fallen out of favour. Modern legal texts regard it as "a recognized, if not controlling, rule of decision", but one commentator has called it "a minority rule of dubious heritage that was misunderstood and misapplied in a few states between 1904 and 1948".

== Present-day legal definitions ==
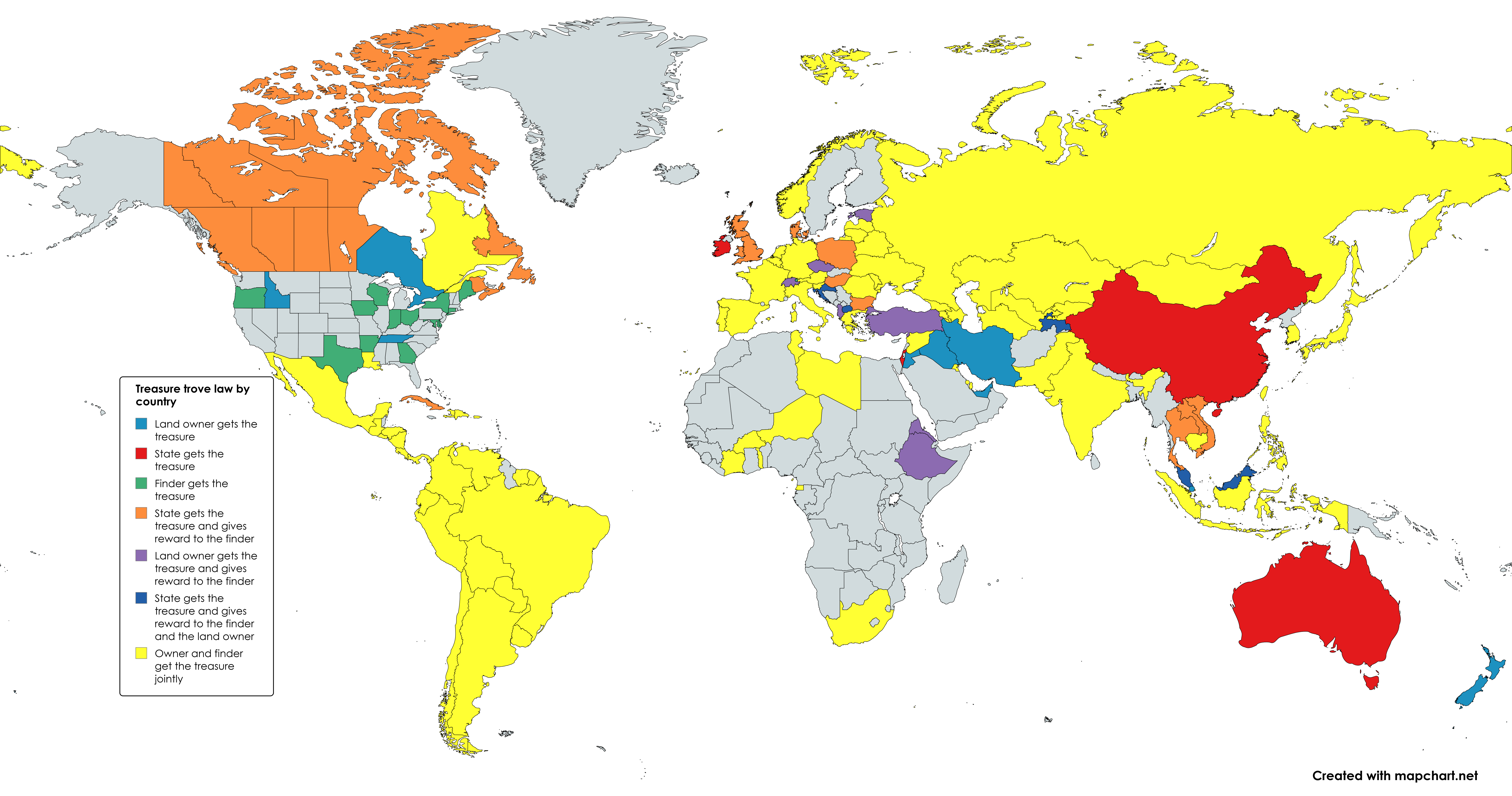
Treasure trove laws by country

=== United Kingdom ===
==== England, Northern Ireland, and Wales ====
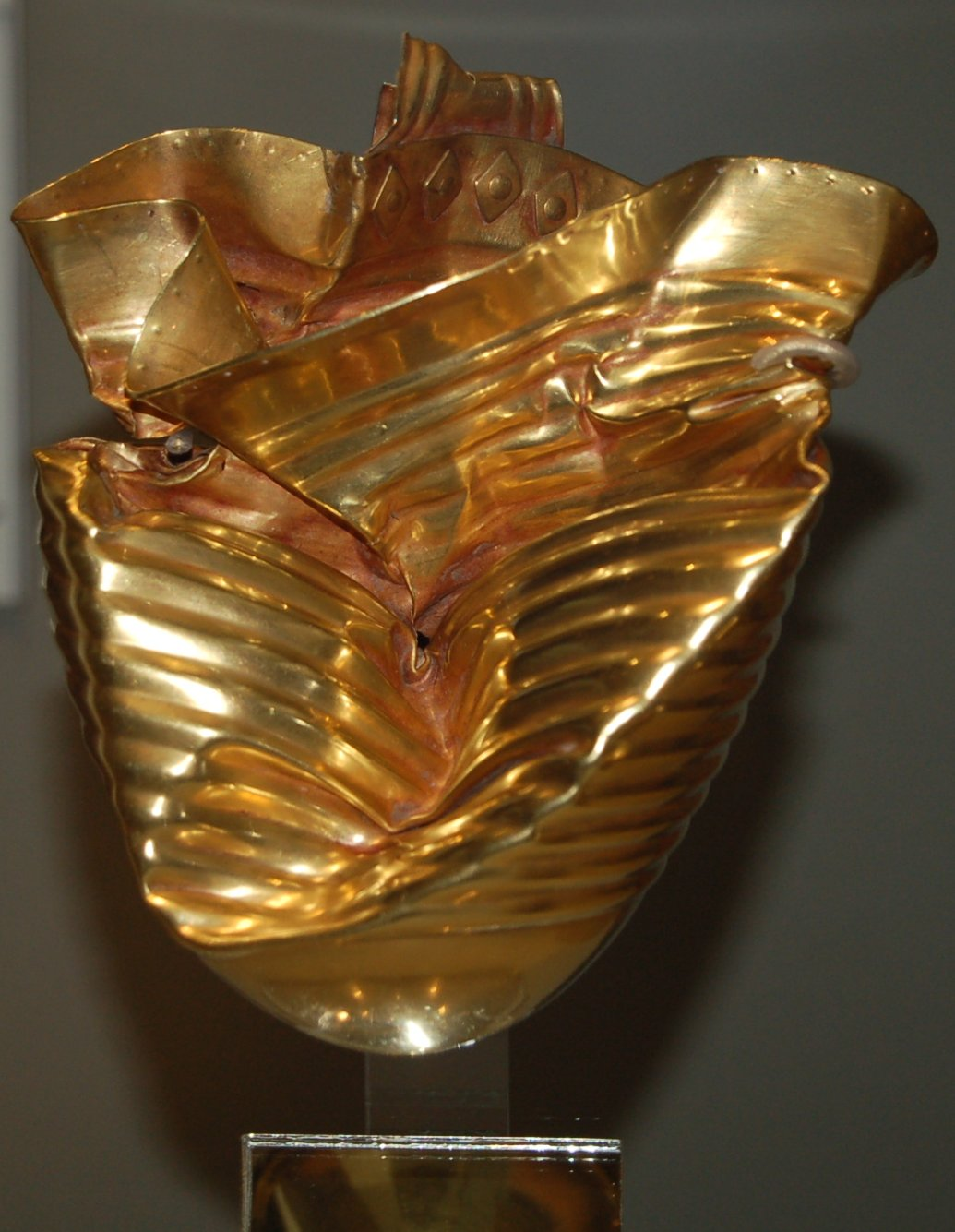
The Ringlemere Cup, found in 2001 in the Ringlemere barrow in Kent, England, which was declared to be treasure under the Treasure Act 1996 and is now displayed in the British Museum. Made of gold, it dates to the Bronze Age, between 1700 and 1500 BC.

Throughout the ages, farmers, archaeologists and amateur treasure hunters have unearthed important treasures of immense historical, scientific and financial value. However, the strictness of the common law rules meant that such items were sometimes not treasure trove. The items risked being sold abroad, or were only saved for the nation by being purchased at a high price. Mention has already been made of the objects comprising the Sutton Hoo ship burial, which were not treasure trove as they had been interred without any intention to retrieve them. The objects were later presented to the nation by their owner, Edith May Pretty, in a 1942 bequest. In March 1973, a hoard of about 7,811 Roman coins was found buried in a field at Coleby in Lincolnshire. It was made up of antoniniani believed to have been minted between AD 253 and 281. The Court of Appeal of England and Wales held in the 1981 case of Attorney-General of the Duchy of Lancaster v. G.E. Overton (Farms) Ltd. that the hoard was not treasure trove as the coins were bronze and did not have a substantial silver content. Thus, it belonged to the owner of the field and could not be retained by the British Museum.

To remedy the faults of the old treasure trove regime, the Treasure Act 1996 introduced a new scheme which came into effect on 24 September 1997. Any treasure found on and after that date regardless of the circumstances in which it was deposited, even if it was lost or left with no intention of recovery, belongs to the Crown, subject to any prior interests or rights held by any franchisee of the Crown. The relevant Secretary of State (currently meaning the Secretary of State for Culture, Media and Sport) may direct that any such treasure be transferred or disposed of, or that the Crown's title in it be disclaimed.

The Act uses the term treasure instead of treasure trove; the latter term is now confined to objects found before the Act came into force. Objects falling within the following definition are "treasure" under the Act:

1. If the object is not a coin, it must be at least 300 years old and at least 10% precious metal (that is, gold or silver) by weight.
2. If the object is a coin, it must either be:
  - one of at least two coins in the same find which are at least 300 years old at that time and are at least 10% precious metal by weight; or
  - one of at least ten coins in the same find which are at least 300 years old at that time.
3. Any object at least 200 years old when found which belongs to a class of objects of outstanding historical, archaeological or cultural importance that has been designated as treasure by the Secretary of State. As of 2006, the following classes of objects had been so designated:
  - Any object, other than a coin, any part of which is base metal (that is, not gold or silver), which when found is one of at least two base metal objects in the same find which are of prehistoric date.
  - Any object, other than a coin, which is of prehistoric date, and any part of which is gold or silver.
4. Any object which would have been treasure trove if found before 24 September 1997.
5. Any object which, when found, is part of the same find as:
  - an object within head (1), (2), (3) or (4) above found at the same time or earlier; or
  - an object found earlier which would be within head (1), (2) or (3) above if it had been found at the same time.

Treasure does not include unworked natural objects, or minerals extracted from a natural deposit, or objects that have been designated not to be treasure by the Secretary of State. Objects falling within the definition of wreck are also not treasure.

Coroners continue to have jurisdiction to enquire into any treasure found in their districts, and into who are or are suspected to be its finders. Anyone finding an object he or she believes or has reasonable grounds to believe is treasure must notify the coroner for the district in which the object is found within 14 days starting from the day after the find or, if later, the day on which the finder first believes or has reason to believe the object is treasure. Not doing so is an offence. Inquests are held without a jury unless the coroner decides otherwise. The coroner must notify the British Museum if his or her district is in England, the Department of the Environment if it is in Northern Ireland, or the National Museum Wales if it is in Wales. The coroner must also take reasonable steps to notify any person who appears may have found the treasure; any person who, at the time it was found, occupied land which it appears may be where the treasure was found; and any other interested persons, including persons involved in the find or having an interest in the land where the treasure was found at that time or since. However, coroners still have no power to make any legal determination as to whether the finder, landowner or occupier of the land has title to the treasure. The courts have to resolve that issue, and may also review coroners' decisions in relation to treasure.

When treasure has vested in the Crown and is to be transferred to a museum, the Secretary of State is required to determine whether a reward should be paid by the museum before the transfer to the finder or any other person involved in the finding of the treasure, the occupier of the land at the time of the find, or any person who had an interest in the land at the time of the find or has had such an interest at any time since then. If the Secretary of State determines that a reward should be paid, he or she must also determine the market value of the treasure (assisted by the Treasure Valuation Committee), the amount of the reward (which cannot exceed the market value), to whom the reward should be paid and, if more than one person should be paid, how much each person should receive.

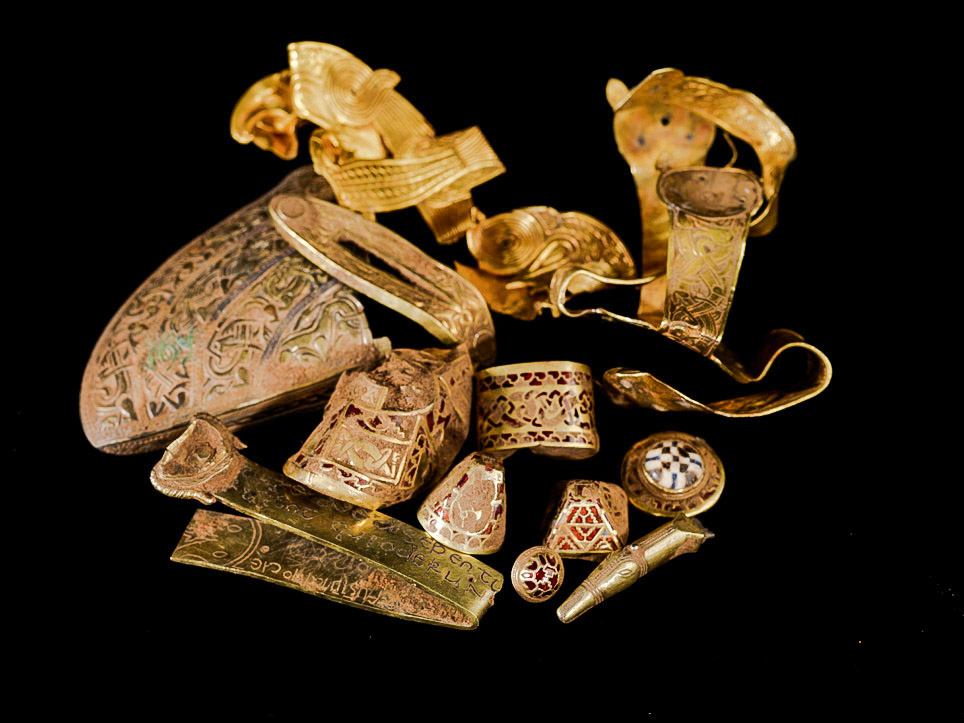
Items from the Staffordshire hoard which were declared to be treasure in September 2009

In England and Wales, finders of objects that are not treasure or treasure trove are encouraged to voluntarily report them under the Portable Antiquities Scheme to finds liaison officers at county councils and local museums. Under the scheme, which started in September 1997, the officers examine finds and provide finders with information on them. They also record the finds, their functions, dates, materials and locations, and place this information into a database which can be analysed. The information on the findspots may be used to organize further research on the areas. Non-treasure finds remain the property of their finders or landowners, who are free to dispose of them as they wish.

On 5 July 2009 the largest single Anglo-Saxon hoard as of that date, consisting of over 1,500 gold and precious metal pieces, helmets and sword decorations tentatively dated to around AD 600–800, was discovered by Terry Herbert in Staffordshire, England. Herbert reported the find to his local Portable Antiquities Scheme officer, and on 24 September 2009 it was declared to be treasure by the South Staffordshire coroner.

In 2019 two metal detectorists, Lisa Grace and Adam Staples, discovered a hoard of 2,528 silver coins spanning the Norman Conquest of 1066. Around half the silver coins depicted the defeated Harold II and half depicted the victorious William the Conqueror. A small number of the coins were 'mule' coins with designs from both reigns, believed to have been the product of early tax evasion, where the minters failed to purchase the up to date die. In 2024 the find was declared to be treasure by the Avon coroner, and was bought for £4.3 million by the South West Heritage Trust using a grant from the National Lottery Heritage Fund.

==== Scotland ====
The Treasure Act 1996 does not apply in Scotland, where treasure trove is dealt with under the common law of Scotland. The general rule that governs bona vacantia ("vacant goods")—that is, objects that are lost, forgotten or abandoned—is quod nullius est fit domini regis ("that which belongs to nobody becomes our lord the king's [or queen's]"), and the law of treasure trove is a specialized application of that rule. As in England, the Crown in Scotland has a prerogative right to treasure trove for it is one of the regalia minora ("minor things of the king"), that is, property rights which the Crown may exercise as it pleases and which it may alienate (transfer to another party).

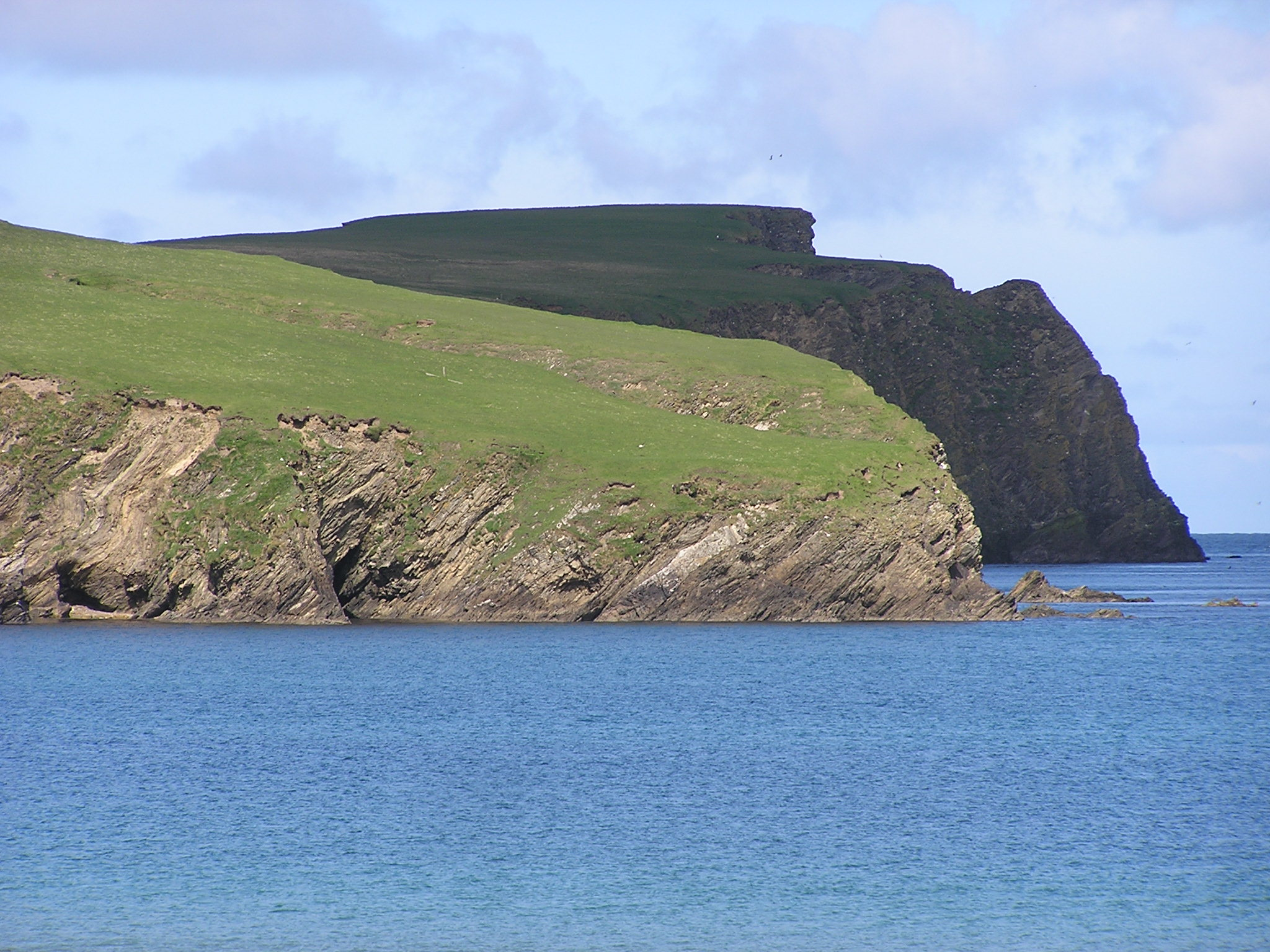
Cliffs of St. Ninian's Isle, photographed on 24 May 2006. The St. Ninian's Isle treasure, which is believed to date to about AD 800, was found on this island.

To qualify as treasure trove, an object must be precious, it must be hidden, and there must be no proof of its property or reasonable presumption of its former ownership. Unlike under English common law, treasure is not restricted to only gold and silver objects. In 1888 a prehistoric jet necklace and some other articles found in Forfarshire were claimed by the authorities though they were neither gold nor silver. A compromise was eventually reached, and the find was deposited in the National Museum of Scotland. In July 1958, a porpoise bone was found together with 28 other objects of silver alloy (12 brooches, seven bowls, a hanging bowl and other small metal work) underneath a stone slab marked with a cross on the floor of St. Ninian's Church on St. Ninian's Isle in Shetland. The objects were dated to c. AD 800. A dispute having arisen over ownership of the objects between the Crown on the one hand, and the finder (the University of Aberdeen, which had carried out the archaeological excavation) and the landowner on the other, in Lord Advocate v University of Aberdeen and Budge (1963) the Court of Session held that the bone should be regarded as treasure trove together with the silver objects. Further, the requirement that an object must be "hidden" means no more than that it must be concealed; it refers to the condition in which the object was found and does not refer back to the intention which the owner of the object may have had in hiding it. Finally, the requirement that there must be no reasonable presumption of former ownership means that it must not be possible to trace the ownership of the object to a person or family currently existing. Even if an object does not qualify as treasure trove, it may be claimed by the Crown as bona vacantia.

The King's and Lord Treasurer's Remembrancer (KLTR), an office held by the Crown Agent who is the senior officer of the Crown Office in Scotland, is responsible for claiming bona vacantia on behalf of the Crown in Scotland. Finders of items are required to report such finds to the Crown Office or to the Treasure Trove Unit (TTU) at the National Museums of Scotland in Edinburgh. Each find is assessed by the Scottish Archaeological Finds Allocation Panel, which recommends if the find should be claimed. If it is, the matter is referred by the TTU to the KLTR department at the Crown Office, which will inform the finder that it has accepted the Panel's recommendation to claim the objects in the find as treasure trove or bona vacantia.

The Panel also recommends to the KLTR a reward for the find based on its current market value where appropriate, and the most appropriate museum in Scotland to allocate it to. The TTU then contacts all museums which have bid for finds to advise them of the Panel's recommendations. The museums have 14 days in which to accept or reject the proposed allocation and reward for the find. If the KLTR accepts the Panel's recommendations, it will notify the finder of the amount of any reward being paid and the museum to which the find has been allocated. The KLTR also asks the museum to pay the finder's reward.

While a Treasury order of 1886 made provision for the preservation of suitable objects in various national museums and payment of rewards to their finders, the Crown is under no legal obligation to offer any rewards for treasure trove objects it has claimed. However, it usually does so, using the objects' market price as a guide. A reward may be withheld or reduced if the finder has inappropriately handled an object, for instance, damaged it by cleaning it or applying waxes and varnishes to it. Finders may elect to waive their rewards. Rewards are not paid for finds occurring during organized fieldwork.

=== United States ===
==== State laws ====
The law of treasure trove in the United States varies from state to state, but certain general conclusions may be drawn. To be treasure trove, an object must be of gold or silver. Paper money is also deemed to be treasure trove since it previously represented gold or silver. On the same reasoning, it might be imagined that coins and tokens in metals other than gold or silver are also included, but this has yet to be clearly established. The object must have been concealed for long enough so it is unlikely that the true owner will reappear to claim it. The consensus appears to be that the object must be at least a few decades old.

A majority of state courts, including those of Arkansas, Connecticut, Delaware, Georgia, Indiana, Iowa, Maine, Maryland, New York, Ohio, Oregon and Wisconsin, have ruled that the finder of treasure trove is entitled to it. The theory is that the English monarch's claim to treasure trove was based on a statutory enactment which replaced the finder's original right. When this statute was not re-enacted in the United States after its independence, the right to treasure trove reverted to the finder.

In Idaho and Tennessee courts have decided that treasure trove belongs to the owner of the place where it was found, the rationale being to avoid rewarding trespassers. In one Pennsylvania case, a lower court ruled that the common law did not vest treasure trove in the finder but in the sovereign, and awarded a find of US$92,800 cash to the state. However, this judgement was reversed by the Supreme Court of Pennsylvania on the basis that it had not yet been decided if the law of treasure trove was part of Pennsylvania law. The Supreme Court deliberately refrained from deciding the issue.

Finds of money and lost property are dealt with by other states through legislation. These statutes usually require finders to report their finds to the police and transfer to their custody the objects. The police then advertise the finds to try to locate their true owner. If the objects remain unclaimed for a specified period of time, title in them vests in the finders. New Jersey vests buried or hidden property in the landowner, Indiana in the county, Vermont in the town, and Maine in the township and the finder equally. In Louisiana, French codes have been followed, so half of a found object goes to the finder and the other half to the landowner. The position in Puerto Rico, the laws of which are based on civil law, is similar.

Finders who are trespassers generally lose all their rights to finds, unless the trespass is regarded as "technical or trivial".

Where the finder is an employee, most cases hold that the find should be awarded to the employer if it has a heightened legal obligation to take care of its customers' property, otherwise it should go to the employee. A find occurring in a bank is generally awarded to the bank as the owner is likely to have been a bank customer and the bank has a fiduciary duty to try to reunite lost property with their owners. For similar reasons, common carriers are preferred to passengers and hotels to guests (but only where finds occur in guest rooms, not common areas). The view has been taken that such a rule is suitable for recently misplaced objects as it provides the best chance for them to be reunited with their owners. However, it effectively delivers title of old artefacts to landowners, since the older an object is, the less likely it is that the original depositor will return to claim it. The rule is therefore of little or no relevance to objects of archaeological value.

Due to the potential for a conflict of interest, police officers and other persons working in law enforcement occupations, and armed forces are not entitled to finds in some states.

==== Federal law ====
US Federal laws governing recovery of treasure are governed by the Archaeological Resources Protection Act of 1979, Under ARPA, "archaeological resources" more than one hundred years old on public lands belong to the government. The term "archaeological resource" means any material remains of past human life or activities which are "of archaeological interest", as determined by federal regulations. Such regulations include, but are not limited to: pottery, basketry, bottles, weapons, weapon projectiles, tools, structures or portions of structures, pit houses, rock paintings, rock carvings, intaglios, graves, human skeletal materials, or any portion or piece of any of the foregoing items. The definition of "archaeological resource" and "archaeological interest" has been broadly interpreted under US agency regulations in recent years to include nearly anything of human origin more than 100 years old, while permits to allow recovery of such items have been largely restricted to digs by credentialed archaeologists. The effect of ARPA as currently defined by federal regulations outlaws virtually all treasure hunting of items more than 100 years old, even treasure troves of gold and silver coin or scrip, under penalty of total forfeiture. Furthermore, the Federal policy against spoliation and removal of "archaeological resources" of any type from federal or Indian lands, even coins and scrip less than 100 years old, means it is unlikely that a finder of gold or silver coinage on Federal lands will prevail with an argument that the find constitutes a treasure trove of coinage, but rather "embedded property" that belongs to the property owner, i.e. the government. The broad use of ARPA to target not only archaeological looting but also to prohibit all treasure hunting on federal or Indian lands has been criticized on the grounds that total prohibition and forfeiture simply encourages concealment or misrepresentation of the age of the found coinage or treasure trove, thus hampering archaeological research, as archaeologists cannot study items that when found will never be reported.

=== France ===
Since 1803 in France, treasure troves are defined according to the French Civil Code under Article 716. The Code States that treasure is defined as “any object hidden or buried which no one can justify as his property and it is discovered by the pure effect of chance”. Under French law, the treasure is divided equally between the landowner and the finder of the treasure. However, under Article L542-1 of the Code du Patrimoine, metal detectorists and searchers must officially obtain permission before searching for treasure, declaring their intent is for archaeological purposes.

=== Denmark ===
In Danish law, the concept of Danefæ is analogous to treasure trove. Anyone finding Danefæ must turn it in to the Danish State Antiquary. The State Antiquary will pay a reward "on the basis of the value of the material and rarity of the find and also of the care with which the finder has safeguarded the find."

== See also ==
- Geocaching
- Gold coin
- Hoard
- Lost, mislaid, and abandoned property
- Silver coin
- Treasure Valuation Committee
