= King's and Lord Treasurer's Remembrancer =

The King's and Lord Treasurer's Remembrancer is an officer in Scotland who represents the Crown's interests in bona vacantia, ultimus haeres and treasure trove.

The K&LTR holds two offices, both instituted at the foundation of the Court of Exchequer in 1707 and which were joined in 1836. The King's Remembrancer was the chief executive officer of the Exchequer under the Barons of Exchequer. The Lord Treasurer's Remembrancer's principal duty was the examination and audit of the criminal accounts for Scotland. In more recent history, this officer was the Treasury representative on various Scottish government boards and acted as Paymaster General in Scotland.

From 1835, the King's Rembrancer carried out the duties of the King's Almoner (which office had been suppressed in 1832), including the payment of annuities to those on the royal charity roll.

From 1858 the office of K&LTR was held in conjunction with that of Registrar of Companies, Limited Partnerships and Business Names, auditor of the accounts of sheriff clerks and procurators fiscal, responsible for the collection of fines and penalties imposed in Scottish courts, Keeper of the Edinburgh Gazette, administrator of treasure trove and of estates of deceased persons which fall to the Crown as ultimus haeres, and responsible for the custody of the Regalia of Scotland kept in Edinburgh Castle.

In 1981 the office was transferred to the Crown Agent, the senior officer of the Crown Office and Procurator Fiscal Service. Since 1999 that office has been part of the Scottish Government, and the link with the Treasury and company registration has been severed.

== Office holders ==
=== King's Remembrancer ===
- Patrick Warrender (1771–1791)
- Sir Patrick Murray, 6th Baronet (1799–1837)
- Sir Henry Jardine (1820–1831)

=== Lord Treasurer's Remembrancer ===
- George Robinson (in 1815)

=== King's/Queen's & Lord Treasurer's Remembrancer ===
- 1832: John Henderson
- 1870: Stair Agnew
- 1881: John James Reid
- 1889: Reginald MacLeod of MacLeod
- 1900: Sir Kenneth John Mackenzie 7th Baronet
- 1921: Sir James Adam
- 1926: John Alexander Inglis
- 1942: Percy Jesse Gowlett Rose
- 1948: Wiliam Douglas Collier
- 1954: Peter Jamieson
- 1961: William Steel
- 1964: James Bertie Ian McTavish
- 1977: David Edmiston Drummond Robertson
- 1981: W.G Chalmers
- 1984: Ian Dean
- 1991: John Duncan Lowe
- 1996: Andrew Normand
- 2002: Norman McFadyen
- 2009: Catherine Patricia Dyer
- 2016: David Harvie
- 2023: John Logue

== See also ==
- King's Remembrancer of the Exchequer of Pleas of England
