= Crown Office and Procurator Fiscal Service =

Independent public prosecution service for Scotland

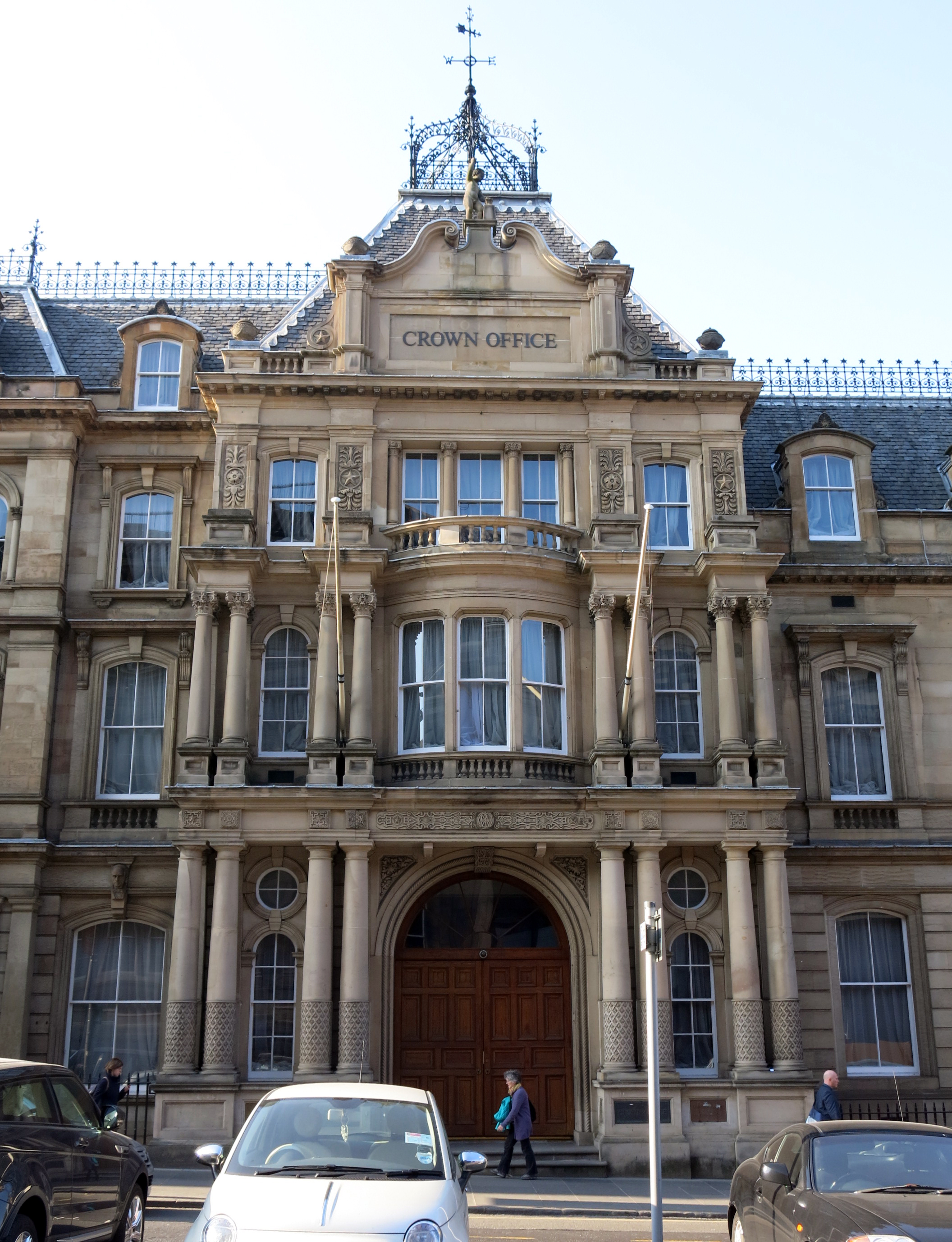
- Crown Office, Chambers Street

Agency overview
- Jurisdiction: Scotland
- Headquarters: 25 Chambers Street, Edinburgh, Scotland
- Employees: 1,650
- Annual budget: £120.7 million (2019-2020)
- Ministers responsible: Ruth Charteris KC, Lord Advocate; B. J. Gill KC, Solicitor General for Scotland
- Agency executive: John Logue, Crown Agent
- Parent agency: Scottish Government
- Website: www.copfs.gov.uk

Listed Building – Category B
- Official name: 25 Chambers Street, Crown Office (Former Heriot Watt University)
- Designated: 29 April 1977; 49 years ago
- Reference no.: LB27981

The Crown Office and Procurator Fiscal Service (Scottish Gaelic: Oifis a' Chrùin agus Seirbheis Neach-casaid a' Chrùin) is the independent public prosecution service for Scotland, and is a Ministerial Department of the Scottish Government. The department is headed by His Majesty's Lord Advocate, who under the Scottish legal system is responsible for prosecution, along with the sheriffdom procurators fiscal. In Scotland, virtually all prosecution of criminal offences is undertaken by the Crown. Private prosecutions are extremely rare.

The Service's jurisdiction covers all of Scotland, and includes investigation and prosecution of criminal offences, sudden or suspicious deaths, and criminal conduct by the police. It also includes assessment and possession of bona vacantia and treasure trove. The Lord Advocate is assisted by the Solicitor General for Scotland, both of whom are Law Officers. The day-to-day running of the Service is carried out by the Crown Agent & Chief Executive and an executive board who are based in the service headquarters at Crown Office in Chambers Street, Edinburgh. The Service employs both civil servants who carry out administrative and other duties and solicitors and advocates who represent the Crown in Court.

== History ==
The history of the Lord Advocate, and the resulting department of the Crown Office, is somewhat obscure. There are references on record to a king's procurator-fiscal in 1434 and 1457, and a queen's advocate in 1462. An office of king's advocate dates from 1478 but between 1478 and 1494 there are references to "advocates" (unnamed) and it is only from 1494 that one can be sure that there was a single king's advocate as the normal representative of the king in treason trials and in civil litigation. The office thus dates back to mediaeval times, with the earliest Lord Advocate being John Ross of Montgrenan, whom the King appointed as his commissioner at a hearing in Stirling in 1476, then as procurator for another case in Edinburgh in the following year.

The history of the procurator fiscal is similarly difficult to set down with exactness, though the role has developed significantly over time. The first documentary reference appears in the Records of the Parliament of Scotland for 22 August 1584, naming several procurators fiscal in Edinburgh. The fiscal was an officer appointed by, and accountable to, the Sheriff, who by the 18th century was responsible for most prosecutions in local areas. By the 19th century, advocates depute were first appointed, to assist him in conducting cases in the High Court of Justiciary and the Crown Office was first established. This became the centre of the prosecution system, and it was to the Lord Advocate now to whom the procurators fiscal were responsible, evidenced by the "Book of Regulations" issued by him to procurators fiscal providing instructions about how to conduct their business. The Book of Regulations is still used today in providing the framework for local prosecution in Scotland.

== Prosecutors ==
=== Lord Advocate and Solicitor General for Scotland ===
As well as departmental management responsibility, the Lord Advocate is directly responsible for prosecuting the most serious crimes, in the High Court of Justiciary at first instance and the Court of Criminal Appeal. Unless the cases are of especial importance, such as the Lockerbie trial held at Camp Zeist in the Netherlands, the prosecutions are normally (but not always) led by advocates depute, who are known collectively as Crown counsel and are experienced members of the Faculty of Advocates normally appointed for a limited period of three years. Their decision to prosecute in this way is taken in the light of the procurator fiscal's recommendations and a report prepared by the police, and any such reports are subject to the direction of the Lord Advocate. This prosecutorial role cannot be removed from her by the Scottish Parliament.

The Lord Advocate is the senior of the two Scottish Law Officers, and is the chief legal adviser to the Scottish Government as well as representing its ministers in civil proceedings. He is also responsible under the Scotland Act 1998 for ensuring that each Act of the Scottish Parliament is within the legislative competence of that Parliament. Additionally, the Lord Advocate and the Solicitor General for Scotland are ex officio entitled to participate (but not vote) in proceedings of the Scottish Parliament to the extent permitted by standing orders. The Solicitor General can act as the deputy for the Lord Advocate.

The Lord Advocate is one of the Great Officers of State in Scotland and one of the Scottish Ministers, though since 23 May 2007 the Lord Advocate has not attended the cabinet of the Scottish Government. The position of Lord Advocate has been the subject of controversy, most notably sparked by Scottish High Court judges, wanting the ministerial and prosecutorial role to be separated.

=== Crown Agent, King's and Lord Treasurer's Remembrancer and Chief Executive ===
The Crown Agent is the principal legal adviser to the Lord Advocate on prosecution matters, as well as serving as chief executive for the department. The Crown Agent acts as the principal legal adviser to the Lord Advocate in all legal proceedings in which the Lord Advocate appears as representing his or her own department, and issues general instructions from and on behalf of the Lord Advocate for the guidance of Crown counsel, procurators fiscal, sheriff clerks and other public officials. The Crown Agent also transmits instructions from Crown counsel to procurators fiscal about prosecutions, and, subject to the direction of the Principal Clerk of Justiciary, arranges sittings of the High Court of Justiciary. At trials in the High Court in Edinburgh, the Crown Agent attends as instructing solicitor. The Crown Agent is ultimately responsible for serious crime committed and re–offending as well as ensuring all deaths reported to the procurator fiscal service are investigated whilst providing support services and information to victims and witnesses.

The Crown Agent also holds the office of King's and Lord Treasurer's Remembrancer, and all property that falls to the Crown as a result of bona vacantia in Scotland is his responsibility, as is treasure trove. The post of Remembrancer was created in 1837 by the amalgamation of two existing posts created in 1707 – the King's/Queen's Remembrancer and the Lord Treasurer's Remembrancer – and has been held since 1981 by the holder of the office of Crown Agent.

=== Advocate deputes ===
At the High Court of Justiciary prosecutions are brought by the Lord Advocate, who is represented in Court by an advocate depute. Advocate deputes are either solicitor-advocates to whom rights of audience in the High Court have been given by that Court or advocates.

=== Procurators fiscal ===
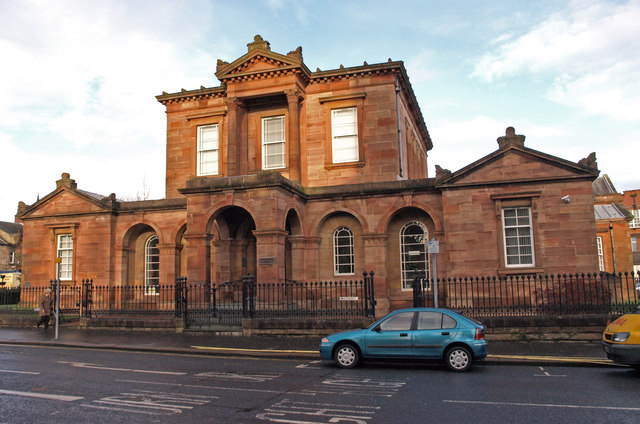
Procurator Fiscal office in Kilmarnock

For the majority of crimes in Scotland a procurator fiscal or fiscal depute presents the case for the prosecution in the sheriff court and justice of the peace courts, and the case for the defence is presented either by the accused's own solicitor or by one from the Public Defence Solicitors' Office, a part of the Scottish Legal Aid Board.

Procurators fiscal make preliminary investigations into criminal cases, take written statements from witnesses (known as precognition) and are responsible for the investigation and prosecution of crime. This includes the power to direct the police in their investigation, but except for serious crimes such as murder the police normally complete their enquiries before involving the procurator fiscal. In the most serious cases, once someone has been charged with an offence and remanded in custody, the Crown must bring the case to court within 110 days or the accused will be admitted to bail. In serious cases (known as solemn procedure with a jury, as opposed to summary procedure without) where the accused is admitted to bail, the trial must commence within 12 months of the date of first appearance in court.

Procurators fiscal work in the local sheriffdom and most of the fiscal offices in Scotland are either in or near the sheriff court. The procurator fiscal is also responsible for the investigation of all sudden, suspicious and unexplained deaths in Scotland. This includes the decision to call a fatal accident inquiry. The procurator fiscal is also responsible for the independent investigation of criminal police complaints made in that sherrifdom (administrative complaints are handled by the Police Investigations and Review Commissioner (PIRC)).

== Prosecution of crimes ==
The law in Scotland does not say that a crime must be prosecuted and the procurators fiscals have considerable discretion over what action to take. If they decide to prosecute a case, they can choose the level at which to prosecute (either through solemn or summary procedure) with the accused having no right to choose a jury trial or for a victim to decide whether or not to press charges, as the decision on whether to try and by which method belongs to the prosecutor as "Master of the Instance". Until 1987, however, their discretion only extended to the degree to which they should prosecute, if at all; there were no alternatives to prosecution. The Criminal Justice (Scotland) Act 1987 gave procurators fiscal the power to offer fixed penalties instead of prosecution (a fiscal fine), at the time limited to a maximum of £25 and subsequently increased to £300.

Since then these options have expanded to giving a warning, fiscal fines, compensation orders, work orders, road traffic fixed penalties or diversion from prosecution into social work, psychological counselling or psychiatric treatment.

== Functions ==
COPFS is organised into functions, namely Local Court, High Court, Specialist Casework and Operational Support, each of which is led by a deputy Crown agent. Within the Local Court function there are six sheriffdom procurators fiscal who are responsible for the consideration and prosecution of criminal casework within the sheriff and justice of the peace courts. Within Local Court there is also a National Initial Case Processing Unit which specialises in the decision making of summary level cases reported to COPFS by Police Scotland and other specialist reporting agencies. In early 2025, the COPFS took over the management of post-mortem examinations in Aberdeen, due to staff shortages, with officials saying the development aimed to "ensure there are no gaps in the provision of these services and to minimise the distress to bereaved families".

== Victim Information and Advice Service ==
Victim Information and Advice Service (VIA) is a dedicated and specialised victim information and advice service within the Crown Office and Procurator Fiscal Service. VIA was created to provide information to victims, bereaved next of kin and keeping them informed about the progress of a case. It also has a duty to advise on and facilitate referral to other agencies for specialist support and counselling as required. VIA works closely with other statutory agencies, such as the police and the courts and with voluntary organisations, such as Court Witness Service, Women's Aid and Victim Support, and is a unique service in the Scottish criminal justice system.

== See also ==
- Crown Prosecution Service, equivalent body in England and Wales
- Public Prosecution Service for Northern Ireland
