= Ultimus haeres =

Concept in Scots law

Ultimus haeres (Latin for ultimate heir) is a concept in Scots law where if a person in Scotland who dies without leaving a will (i.e. intestate) and has no blood relative who can be easily traced, the estate is claimed by the King's and Lord Treasurer's Remembrancer on behalf of the Crown. It is one of two rights to ownerless property that the Crown possess, the others being bona vacantia.

Because of ancient nature of the Crown's right, little academic or case law focuses on the application of ultimus haeres in Scots Law. However, the leading authoritative text in this area is A.G MacMillan, The Law of Bona Vacantia in Scotland. (W. Green & Son, limited, 1936).

In England & Wales, such matters are dealt with under bona vacantia. In Scots law, bona vacantia relates to ownerless property alone, rather than property falling part of a deceased's estate with no living heirs.

== Operation of Ultimus Haeres ==
Typically, where an individual dies without leaving a valid will in Scotland, or with a Scottish domicile, (i.e.: they die intestate) their estate is distributed amongst surviving relatives under the rules of the Succession (Scotland) Act 1964.

However, where the deceased leaves no surviving heirs, their estate (including any land) falls to the Crown as ultimus haeres (the ultimate heir). The KLTR, in conjunction with the Procurator Fiscal Service, operates a National Ultimus Haeres Unit (“NUHU”) based in Hamilton to receive and investigate all unclaimed estates from individuals domiciled in Scotland.

The KLTR as standard practice will sell ultimus haeres land on the open market and place any monies raised on a public register for descendants of the deceased to view. There is no limit to inheritance in Scots law, and with the developments in DNA testing, an heir to the estate will typically be found, especially with the rise of professional probate researches who approach oblivious heritors in return for a fee.
