= Unowned property =

Property that lacks an owner

Unowned property includes tangible, physical things that are capable of being reduced to being property owned by a person but are not owned by anyone. Bona vacantia (Latin for "ownerless goods") is a legal concept associated with the unowned property, which exists in various jurisdictions, with a consequently varying application, but with origins mostly in English law.

Nearly every piece of land on the Earth is a property and has a maintainer (owner). The class of objects, "unowned things", are objects which are not yet property; either because it has been agreed by sovereign nations that no one can own them, or because no person, or other entity, has made a claim of ownership. The most common unowned things are asteroids. The UN's Outer Space Treaty does not address the issue of private ownership of natural objects in space. All asteroids remain unowned things until some person or entity makes a claim of property right to one of them.

In an experimental legal case of first impression, a lawsuit for a declaratory judgment was filed in a United States Federal Court to determine the lawful owner of Asteroid 433 Eros. 433 Eros was claimed as property by Gregory W. Nemitz of Orbital Development. According to the homestead principle, Nemitz argued that he had the right to claim ownership of any celestial body that he made use of; he claimed he had designated Eros a spacecraft parking facility and wished to charge NASA a parking and storage fee of twenty cents per year for its NEAR Shoemaker spacecraft that is permanently stored there. Nemitz's case was dismissed due to lack of standing and an appeal denied.

== Ferae naturae ==
Ferae naturae (lit. "wild animals of nature") is a Latin legal term referring to wild animals, in contrast to domitae naturae (lit. "tamed [animals] of nature").

In property law, ferae naturae residing on unowned real property are not predisposed to one party or another in regards to possession.

See: Pierson v. Post (3 Cai. R. 175, 2 Am. Dec. 264) (Supreme Court of New York 1805)

In the event that the animals are on a private entity's estate, the owner of the estate, if pursuing or attempting to apprehend ferae naturae is likely to be deemed, by the court, the rightful possessor to the title of the animal.

See: Keeble v Hickeringill, 11 East 574, 103 Eng. Rep. 1127 OR 3 Salk. 9 (as Keeble v Hickeringhall) Queen's Bench, 1707

== Canada ==
Bona vacantia is applied according to the laws of the relevant province, and the roots of the laws may be traced to Roman law.

== New Zealand ==
Similarly to England, unclaimed money will mostly escheat to the Crown who may then make further distribution. Unclaimed property other than money might also be claimed on behalf of the Crown but (as with the UK jurisdictions) this is not inevitable.

== United Kingdom ==
=== England and Wales ===
Bona vacantia is partly a common law doctrine and partly found in statute. It deals with:

- Assets of dissolved companies that have failed to be distributed or have been disclaimed by the official receiver.
- Assets of dissolved unincorporated associations that have failed to be distributed
- Assets of the estates of deceased persons that have failed to be distributed due to intestacy and a lack of known persons entitled to inherit
- Some failed trust property

For most of England and Wales, the Bona Vacantia Division of the Government Legal Department is responsible for dealing with bona vacantia assets on behalf of the Crown. If no heirs to an estate can be found then the assets are realised and the balance is transferred to HM Treasury. The division deals only with solvent estates whose net value exceeds £500. The assets of dissolved companies automatically pass to the Crown by law. They are realised by the division and the revenue passed to the Exchequer, although the division has a power to disclaim onerous assets. Liabilities associated with assets do not automatically follow those assets into bona vacantia. Care should be taken to distinguish between assets remaining when dissolution commences (which might be distributed to shareholders or others in that process) and those that for various valid reasons remain undistributed at the end of dissolution. Some assets might only come to notice after dissolution has taken place.

==== Cornwall and Lancashire ====
For assets based in Cornwall and within the traditional boundaries of the county palatine of Lancashire, Farrer & Co solicitors deal with bona vacantia on behalf of the Duchy of Cornwall and the Duchy of Lancaster respectively. In both cases, if no rightful owner is found for the assets, the assets legally pass to the respective duchies. It has been stated that current practice for both is to donate these assets to charity. However, there is evidence that these funds have been used for personal profit of the monarch. In Lancaster the beneficiaries are the Duchy of Lancaster Benevolent Fund and the Duchy of Lancaster Jubilee Trust, while in Cornwall The Duke of Cornwall's Benevolent Fund receives the assets.

When Henry III established in 1230 the Office of the Royal Escheator to centralize bona vacantia, Edmund, Earl of Cornwall pressed his claim to bona vacantia by having his viscounts continue to handle them. Until the 1337 and 1338 Duchy Charters, the issue was contentious between the king and earl. In the Duchy Charters, the king formalized the bona vacantia right with the duchy.

When Lancaster was made a county palatine in 1351 by Edward III, the Royal Escheator's powers over Lancaster ended, and bona vacantia property escheated to the duchy instead of the Crown.

=== Northern Ireland ===
In Northern Ireland, bona vacantia is dealt with by the Crown Solicitor as the Treasury Solicitor's agent. The value of the assets collected in Northern Ireland are separately identified in the annual report of HM Procurator General and Treasury Solicitor Accounts for the Crown's Nominee.

=== Scotland ===
In Scotland, bona vacantia deals with assets of dissolved companies, the assets of missing persons and lost or abandoned property; lost or abandoned property involves a statutory saving for the Crown in ss.67–79 of the Civic Government (Scotland) Act 1982. It is mostly controlled by common law with some statutes dealing with specific matters such as lost property; the concept also extends to such matters as treasure trove. The separate doctrine of ultimus haeres states that the assets of those who die intestate leaving no other person entitled to inherit pass to the Crown. Both of these rights, together with treasure trove, are administered by the King's and Lord Treasurer's Remembrancer, an office held by the Crown Agent, the senior official in the Crown Office and Procurator Fiscal Service (COPFS). Bona vacantia assets in Scotland are not aggregated with those from elsewhere in the United Kingdom, being paid directly into the Scottish Consolidated Fund.

=== Crown dependencies ===
==== Guernsey ====
In Guernsey, assets of dissolved companies may become bona vacantia under s.369 of the Companies (Guernsey) Law, as amended, and are administered by the Receiver-General (HM Procureur).

== United States ==
Bona vacantia was inherited from English common law and continues in the form of lost, mislaid, and abandoned property, applied only to personal property that has left the owner's possession, as opposed to an estate left in intestacy after death. Intangible personal assets such as checks, account balances, and securities are under unclaimed property law, varying by state. The states do not take permanent possession, but act as the custodian of the property in perpetuity on behalf of the rightful owner.

== See also ==
- Claims Conference
- Escheat
- Hefker
- Res nullius
