= List of acts of the Parliament of Scotland from 1617 =

This is a list of acts of the Parliament of Scotland for the year 1617.

It lists acts of Parliament of the old Parliament of Scotland, that was merged with the old Parliament of England to form the Parliament of Great Britain, by the Union with England Act 1707 (c. 7).

For other years, see list of acts of the Parliament of Scotland. For the period after 1707, see list of acts of the Parliament of Great Britain.

== 1617 ==
The 22nd parliament of James VI, held in Edinburgh from 27 May 1617.

Short title, or popular name	Citation	Royal assent
Long title
Bishops Act 1617 (repealed)	1617 c. 1 (Note: This is the citation in the Record Edition.); 1617 c. 1 (Note: This is the citation in the Duodecimal Edition.)	28 June 1617
Anent the electioun of Archbischopes and bischopes. (Repealed by Confession of Faith Ratification Act 1690 (c. 7))
Chapters Act 1617 (repealed)	1617 c. 2; 1617 c. 2	28 June 1617
Anent the Restitutioun of chapteris. (Repealed by Statute Law Revision (Scotland) Act 1906 (6 Edw. 7. c. 38))
Plantation of Kirks Act 1617 (repealed)	1617 c. 3; 1617 c. 3	28 June 1617
Anent the plantatioun of kirkis. (Repealed by Statute Law Revision (Scotland) Act 1964 (c. 80))
Leases by Prelates Act 1617 (repealed)	1617 c. 4; 1617 c. 4	28 June 1617
Anent the setting of takis be prelatis and vtheris beneficed persones. (Repealed by Statute Law Revision (Scotland) Act 1906 (6 Edw. 7. c. 38))
Dilapidation of Benefices Act 1617 (repealed)	1617 c. 5; 1617 c. 5	28 June 1617
Additioun to the act anent dilapidatioun off benefices. (Repealed by Statute Law Revision (Scotland) Act 1906 (6 Edw. 7. c. 38))
Communion Elements Act 1617 (repealed)	1617 c. 6; 1617 c. 6	28 June 1617
Anent furnesing of necessaris for ministratione of the sacramentis. (Repealed by Statute Law Revision (Scotland) Act 1964 (c. 80))
Attendance in Parliament Act 1617 (repealed)	1617 c. 7; 1617 c. 7	28 June 1617
Anent unlawis of absentis frome Parliament. (Repealed by Statute Law Revision (Scotland) Act 1906 (6 Edw. 7. c. 38))
Justice of Peace Act 1617 (repealed)	1617 c. 8; 1617 c. 8	28 June 1617
Anent the Justices for keiping of the Kingis Majesties peace and thair constables. (Repealed by Statute Law Revision (Scotland) Act 1906 (6 Edw. 7. c. 38))
Teinds Act 1617 (repealed)	1617 c. 9; 1617 c. 9	28 June 1617
Anent the teynding of Cornis. (Repealed by Statute Law Revision (Scotland) Act 1906 (6 Edw. 7. c. 38))
Poor Act 1617 (repealed)	1617 c. 10; 1617 c. 10	28 June 1617
Anent the poore. (Repealed by Statute Law Revision (Scotland) Act 1906 (6 Edw. 7. c. 38))
Queen's Council Act 1617 (repealed)	1617 c. 11; 1617 c. 11	28 June 1617
Anent the Queines counsell. (Repealed by Statute Law Revision (Scotland) Act 1906 (6 Edw. 7. c. 38))
Prescription Act 1617 (repealed)	1617 c. 12; 1617 c. 12	28 June 1617
Anent prescriptioun of heretable Rightis. (Repealed by Prescription and Limitation (Scotland) Act 1973 (c. 52))
Reduction Act 1617 (repealed)	1617 c. 13; 1617 c. 13	28 June 1617
Anent reductioun of Retouris and summondis of Errour. (Repealed by Prescription and Limitation (Scotland) Act 1973 (c. 52))
Executors Act 1617 still in force	1617 c. 14; 1617 c. 14	28 June 1617
Anent Exequutoures.
Escheats Act 1617 (repealed)	1617 c. 15; 1617 c. 15	28 June 1617
Anent the escheat of lyifrent takis. (Repealed by Statute Law Revision (Scotland) Act 1964 (c. 80))
Registration Act 1617 still in force	1617 c. 16; 1617 c. 16	28 June 1617
Anent the Registratione of reuersiones Seasingis and vtheris writis.
Arrestments Act 1617 (repealed)	1617 c. 17; 1617 c. 17	28 June 1617
Anent the Lowsing of Arreistmentis. (Repealed by Bankruptcy and Diligence etc. (Scotland) Act 2007 (asp 3))
Forests Act 1617 (repealed)	1617 c. 18; 1617 c. 18	28 June 1617
Anent the keiping of forrestis. (Repealed by Statute Law Revision (Scotland) Act 1906 (6 Edw. 7. c. 38))
Dovecotes Act 1617 (repealed)	1617 c. 19; 1617 c. 19	28 June 1617
Anent Dowcatis. (Repealed by Statute Law (Repeals) Act 1974 (c. 22))
Drunkards Act 1617 (repealed)	1617 c. 20; 1617 c. 20	28 June 1617
Anent the punischment of drunkardis. (Repealed by Statute Law Revision (Scotland) Act 1906 (6 Edw. 7. c. 38))
Cawps Act 1617 (repealed)	1617 c. 21; 1617 c. 21	28 June 1617
Anent dischargeing of caulpis. (Repealed by Statute Law Revision (Scotland) Act 1906 (6 Edw. 7. c. 38))
Protocols Act 1617 (repealed)	1617 c. 22; 1617 c. 22	28 June 1617
Anent the inbringing of prothogollis. (Repealed by Statute Law Revision (Scotland) Act 1906 (6 Edw. 7. c. 38))
Saving the Right Act 1617 Not public and general	1617 c. 23; 1617 c. 23	28 June 1617
Act Saluo Jure cujuslibet.
Commission on Heritable Offices Act 1617 (repealed)	1617 c. 24 — (Note: This act is not listed in the Duodecimal Edition.)	28 June 1617
A commissione for heretable offices. (Repealed by Statute Law Revision (Scotland) Act 1906 (6 Edw. 7. c. 38))
Commission on Justice Courts Act 1617 (repealed)	1617 c. 25 —	28 June 1617
A commissione for keiping of Justice Courtes. (Repealed by Statute Law Revision (Scotland) Act 1906 (6 Edw. 7. c. 38))
Not public and general	1617 c. 26 —	28 June 1617
Act anent the Clangregour.
Not public and general	1617 c. 27 —	28 June 1617
Act in favouris of the Archbischope of St Androis.
Not public and general	1617 c. 28 —	28 June 1617
Act for ane new assignatione to the castell of Edinburgh out of his Majesties propertie.
Not public and general	1617 c. 29 —	28 June 1617
Annexatioun of Feirne to the bischoprick of Ross.
Not public and general	1617 c. 30 —	28 June 1617
Annexatioun of Croceraguell and Monymusk to the bischoprick of Dumblane.
Not public and general	1617 c. 31 —	28 June 1617
Annexatione of Icolmekill and Ardchattan to the bischoprik of the Yles.
Not public and general	1617 c. 32 —	28 June 1617
Act anent the chapter of the Bischop of the Yles.
Not public and general	1617 c. 33 —	28 June 1617
Anent the erectioun of the kirk of Ballintrae.
Not public and general	1617 c. 34 —	28 June 1617
Unione of the kirkis of Kilbryid and Renfrew to the Colledge of Glasgow.
Not public and general	1617 c. 35 —	28 June 1617
Act for cheingeing of the kirk of Strathgeth.
Not public and general	1617 c. 36 —	28 June 1617
For cheingeing of the kirk of Lawder.
Commission on Tanning Act 1617 (repealed)	1617 c. 37 —	28 June 1617
A commissioun anent barking of hyidis. (Repealed by Statute Law Revision (Scotland) Act 1906 (6 Edw. 7. c. 38))
Not public and general	1617 c. 38 —	28 June 1617
Ratificatioun in favouris of the Duke of Lennox.
Not public and general	1617 c. 39 —	28 June 1617
Ratificatione in favoures of the Earle of Dumfermling Lord Chancelare.
Not public and general	1617 c. 40 —	28 June 1617
Ratificatioun to the Erle of Argyill.
Not public and general	1617 c. 41 —	28 June 1617
Ratificatioun to the Earle of Errole.
Not public and general	1617 c. 42 —	28 June 1617
Ratificatioun to the Erle of Home, Protestatioun made by the Earle of Roxburgh.
Not public and general	1617 c. 43 —	28 June 1617
Act in favoures of Robert Maxuell, Protestatiounes for the Laird of Greneheid and utheris aganis the said act.
Not public and general	1617 c. 44 —	28 June 1617
Act in favoures of the Lord Sanquhare.
Not public and general	1617 c. 45 —	28 June 1617
Tuo ratificationes in favoures off the Lord Bynning.
Not public and general	1617 c. 46 —	28 June 1617
Ratificatioun to the Lord Blantyre.
Not public and general	1617 c. 47 —	28 June 1617
Ratificatione to S^{r} Gedeone Murray of dyvers his infeftmentis.
Not public and general	1617 c. 48 —	28 June 1617
Ratificatioun to S^{r} Gedeoun Murray Williame and Walter Murrayis his sones.
Not public and general	1617 c. 49 —	28 June 1617
Ratificatioun to the said S^{r} Gedeone Murraye off the provestrie off Crichtoun.
Not public and general	1617 c. 50 —	28 June 1617
Ratificatioun to the Lord Colvill off Culross.
Not public and general	1617 c. 51 —	28 June 1617
Ratificatioun to S^{r} Andro Hammiltoun.
Not public and general	1617 c. 52 —	28 June 1617
Ratificatioun to S^{r} Patrik Murray.
Not public and general	1617 c. 53 —	28 June 1617
Ratificatioun to Jhone Murraye of Lochmaben and laird of Lochinvare.
Not public and general	1617 c. 54 —	28 June 1617
Act in favoures of Jhonne Murray anent the erectioun of Haliewode.
Not public and general	1617 c. 55 —	28 June 1617
Ratificatioun to the old colledge of Abirdene.
Not public and general	1617 c. 56 —	28 June 1617
Ratificatioun to the new colledge of Abirdene.
Not public and general	1617 c. 57 —	28 June 1617
Ratificatioun to S^{r} Henrye Wardlaw.
Not public and general	1617 c. 58 —	28 June 1617
Ratificatioun to S^{r} Henrye Wardlaw and James Bailyee.
Not public and general	1617 c. 59 —	28 June 1617
Ratificatioun to M^{r} James Oliphant.
Not public and general	1617 c. 60 —	28 June 1617
Ratificatioun to M^{r} Patrik Hammiltoun.
Not public and general	1617 c. 61 —	28 June 1617
Ratificatioun to the toun of Abirdene.
Not public and general	1617 c. 62 —	28 June 1617
Ratificatioun to M^{r} Williame Oliphant.

=== Sources ===
- Alexander, William (1841). "Acta Parliamentorum Regis Jacobi Sexti". An Abridgement of the Acts of the Parliaments of Scotland. Edinburgh: Adam and Charles Black. p. A43 – via Google Books.
- Alexander, William (1841). "Acta Parliamentorum Regis Jacobi Sexti". An Abridgement of the Acts of the Parliaments of Scotland. Edinburgh: Adam and Charles Black. p. A43 – via Google Books.
- Chronological Table of the Statutes. London: Her Majesty's Stationery Office. 1972. pp. 1347–1348 – via Google Books.
- "Acts of the Old Scottish Parliament: 1617". legislation.gov.uk. The National Archives.
- "Index of Statutes: Index of Statutes: James VI (1567-1625)". Records of the Parliaments of Scotland to 1707. University of St Andrews.

== See also ==
- List of legislation in the United Kingdom
- Records of the Parliaments of Scotland
