= Possession (Scots law) =

Legal concept relating to holding property in Scots law

Possession in Scots law occurs when an individual physically holds property with the intent to use it. Possession is traditionally viewed as a state of fact, rather than real right (or right in rem / property right) and is not the same concept as ownership in Scots law. It is now said that certain possessors may additionally have the separate real right of ius possidendi (the right to possess). Like much of Scots property law, the principles of the law of possession mainly derive from Roman law.

In possession, the custodian of the property (both heritable and moveable property are capable of possession) is termed a possessor and described as being in possession of the property if he/she detains the property with the necessary mental intention. Even if regarded as a real right, possession is distinct from the right of ownership, and without the real right of ownership, or other possessory real right, a possessor's legal rights to the property are limited. However, the possessor has one important legal right, the right not to be unlawfully dispossessed, and its remedy, the action of spuilzie (pronounced 'spooley'), is still enforceable in modern times. The remedies within an action of spuilzie include restitution (return) of the property and compensation. Possession is relevant to many areas of Scots law.

== Possession and ownership ==
Possession is distinct from the concept of ownership, deriving from the same distinction found in Roman law. However, possession is commonly regarded as the foundation of ownership due its requirement in the creation of the right of ownership (such as by occupatio and within transfers of corporeal moveable property). Nicholas illustrated the difference between possession and ownership in Roman law as:

"There is an obvious distinction in ordinary language between having a thing and being entitled to have it. The thief is not entitled to what he has stolen but he nevertheless has it, and conversely the man who has pawned the ring is still entitled to it but no longer has it. The difference between being entitled to a thing and actually having it is at the root of this distinction in Roman law."

The Roman jurist Ulpian also wrote that "possession and ownership have nothing in common". Therefore the term in possession in Scots law does not relate to the right of ownership but of the factual situation in which a possessor occupies, or holds, property.

=== Reform ===
Whilst possession is a distinct concept from ownership, certain reforms have been introduced into Scots law providing protections of possessors who do not also have a valid right of ownership in the property they possess. For land, this includes the good faith protections available to deed grantees under the Land Registration (Scotland) Act 2012. The Scottish Law Commission in its Report on Prescription and Title to Moveable Property (SLC Report No 228, 2012) have recommended the introduction of protections for possessors to allow them ownership of corporeal moveable property in certain circumstances:

"The Commission recommends two new rules which would convert possession to ownership. The first would apply where the person possessing the object reasonably believes that he or she is the owner, but turns out not to be – usually because the person from whom the object was bought was not the true owner. Provided that the possessor is in good faith (and does not, for instance, have reason to believe that the object was stolen), he or she would become owner after possessing the object for a continuous period of 20 years. The second rule applies to lent or deposited property where the owner can no longer be traced. Although the rule is general in application, it is particularly aimed to help museums and galleries. Under the new rule, the holder of the object would be able to claim ownership if the owner had not been in contact for 50 years and could not be traced using reasonable diligence. This certainty of ownership will assist museums and galleries in cataloguing and managing their collections."

As of 2020, the recommendations of this Report have not been implemented into legislation by the Scottish Parliament.

== Acquisition of possession ==
There are two requirements for acquisition of possession:

=== (1) Act of the body (corpus possessionis) ===
The first requirement of possession is an act of body, or corpus, in which the possessor physically detains the property. There are said to be two forms of the physical act, or corpus: (1) natural possession and (2) civil possession. Both forms require some form of physical contact. With civil possession, the possessor is in indirect physical control of the property, Civil possession can apply to both heritable and moveable property (excluding incorporeal property, see below) eg: Peter rents a shop from a commercial landlord, Peter's natural possession gives his landlord civil possession. In natural possession, the possessor alone has direct physical control, eg: Susan buys a vase and collects it from the shop, Susan has natural possession of the vase.

=== (2) Act of the mind (animus possidendi) ===
The second requirement for possession to occur is an act of the mind, or animus, in which the possessor must have the two requisite mental states.These are (1) the intention to exercise physical control of the property and (2) the intention to exercise control for their own benefit. Combining these two intentions together, the possessor is required to have the intention to exercise physical control of the property for their own use (in Latin: animus sibi habendi). Without the mental element (animus), a holder is said to be a custodian of property and not a possessor, and does not have the right to possess the property (ius possidendi).

Traditionally in Scots law, and following from Roman law, the test for animus was whether the possessor had the mental element of possession as owner (animo domini). The result was that occupiers of the property, such as lessees (ie leaseholders) could not be said to acquire possession. However, the modern test for the act of the mind is now broader, allowing non-owners, including thieves, to acquire possession. Other jurisdictions such as English law allows any holder of property to be considered possessor except employees and temporary holders. Unlike ownership in Scots law, which is a unititular, or allodial, right, possession can be held by separate individuals, eg a tenant can possess a flat for herself and possess the flat on the landlord's behalf. Following Chief Constable of Strathclyde Police v Sharp, because unlawful takers of property are capable of acquiring possession (see below) there is no requirement that the acquiring is in good faith (bona fide).

Following an act of the body and an act of the mind, the holder of the property acquires possession under Scots law. Possession of property can continue thereafter animo solo (by act of the mind alone), so the property does not require continued physical, direct or indirect, control in order to continue possession.

==== Presumption of possession ====
Where possession has occurred, irrespective of the lawful or unlawful acquisition of the property (see below), the possessor is entitled to two presumptions in Scots law. These are (1) the possessor is a lawful possessor, and (2) the possessor is the owner of the property. In other jurisdictions, these presumptions are characterised by the phrase 'possession is nine-tenths of the law'.

== Forms of possession ==
Due to the rules for the acquisition of possession, it follows that there are three main forms of possession:

=== (1) Natural possession ===
A possessor can be in natural possession where they hold the property personally. eg: David finds a wallet on the ground in the street and decides to keep it. David is in natural possession of the wallet.

=== (2) Civil possession ===
A possessor can be in civil possession where they hold property through the natural possession of another individual. eg: Susan buys a vase from a shop but informs the shopkeeper she will collect it later. She later asks Margaret to collect the vase from the shop on her behalf, Susan is said to have civil possession of the vase.

=== (3) Possession animo solo ===
A possessor can still be in possession of an object without physical (corpus) control over the property. This is possession animo solo, where possession is retained by act of the mind alone. eg: Susan leaves her vase in her house while she goes to the shop. Susan is still in possession of the vase by possession animo solo.

=== Lawful and unlawful possession ===
A further distinction is also made in possession between possessors who have acquired possession lawfully and possessors who take natural possession of the property unlawfully. Possessors who acquire possession lawfully, such as by the methods of delivery (see below), are known as lawful possessors. Possessors who acquire possession unlawfully, such as by theft, are termed unlawful possessors. It is recognised that unlawful dispossession occurs where the property has been taken without the consent of the possessor, or without a judicial court order authorising removal of the property from the possessor.

== Voluntary transfers of possession (delivery) ==
Possession is capable of voluntary transfer (termed delivery in Scots law) by either (1) actual delivery or (2) constructive delivery. The rules relating to transfer of possession derive from Roman law and are similar to the methods of transfer of ownership of corporeal moveable property.

=== Actual delivery ===
Actual delivery is the physical transfer of property from the possessor personally to a new possessor.

=== Constructive delivery ===
Transfers of possession are capable of being transferred by operation of the law and are known as constructive delivery. The following methods of constructive delivery (ie: transfers of possession recognised by law) are:

==== (1) Delivery by a natural possessor ====
This form of delivery of possession commonly occurs where a natural possessor (B) holds property for a civil possessor (A) and, with the authorisation of the civil possessor, transfers the property to a new possessor (C) by operation of constructive delivery.

Eg: Susan returns to the shop (see above) and buys three picture frames and informs the shopkeeper she will collect the frames another day, placing the shopkeeper in natural possession of the frames. She later meets Margaret and decides to let her have one of the picture frames as a gift to say thank you for collecting her vase. Susan phones the shop and tells the shopkeeper to put one of her picture frames aside for Margaret. Margaret goes to the shop and collects the frame. Margaret has acquired possession by constructive delivery.

==== (2) Shorthand delivery (delivery brevi manu) ====
Delivery brevi manu , or shorthand delivery, occurs where a natural possessor holds the property owned by another (the civil possessor) and the civil possessor subsequently transfers ownership to the natural possessor, thereby vesting the natural possessor with full possession. In these circumstances, the natural possessor's physical act (the corpus) occurs before the required animus (the act of the mind).

Eg: Susan goes to the shop and buys a necklace and takes it home with her. She later meets her niece Ishbel and decides to loan Ishbel the necklace to wear to a cocktail party, placing Ishbel in natural possession of the necklace while Susan retains civil possession. The next day, Ishbel phones Susan to thank her for the loan. To Ishbel's surprise, Susan says she can keep the necklace as a gift. Ishbel has acquired full possession by shorthand delivery.

==== (3) Longhand delivery (delivery longa manu) ====
Delivery longa manu, or longhand delivery, occurs where large or bulky property cannot be physically acquired by actual delivery easily. Instead, possession can be transferred by the longhand, in which the corpus (or physical act) is reduced to mere pointing or symbolic delivery alone. Possession by the longhand

===== Pointing =====
Delivery longa manu to a new possessor is capable by pointing at the property alone. As Nicholas describes:

"If I wish to give you possession of a pile of logs, it is sufficient if I point them out to you; to require that you should touch them would simply be pedantic"

This rule allows property such as land or large moveable property to be easily passed by sufficient identification alone.

===== Symbols =====
Delivery longa manu of property to a new possessor is also capable through the transfer of possession of a symbol of the property. The most common example, cited in Roman texts, is a warehouse of goods with the goods transferred by the symbolic delivery of a key to the warehouse. In Scots law, symbolic delivery of possession commonly occurs by transfer of the bill of lading of shipped goods.

==== (4) Constitutum possessorium (delivery by the mind alone/animo solo) ====
Constitutum possessorium (i.e. a possessory agreement) is viewed as the inverse of delivery brevi manu by allowing the divested possessor to retain natural possession, but civil possession is given to the new possessor.

Eg: Ishbel sells her necklace to James as gift for his wife's birthday. However, James does not want his wife to find the necklace at home so he asks Ishbel to keep the necklace until closer to his wife's birthday. Ishbell agrees. James has acquired civil possession by constitutum possessorium (possessory agreement)

== The real right to possess (ius possidendi) ==
As discussed above, possession is traditionally viewed as a state of fact rather than a legal right. This follows the Roman law's principles that possession is a factual matter that gives rise to certain legal rights and remedies. However, certain possessors may also have an additional legal right to possess known as the ius possidendi (the right to possess). It is now generally viewed that the ius possidendi is a real right in Scots law, although there is little legal authority on the issue. Those without the real right of possession (the ius possidendi) have only a personal right (or right in personam) to possess the property. However, as will be explained, the real right of ius possidendi is not an autonomous standalone right in itself.

=== Acquisition of the ius possidendi ===
The ius possidendi is not a free standing real right in its own right, unlike all other real rights falling within the numerus clausus. Instead the ius possidendi is dependent upon an individual holding another real right in the property that entitles them to possession, ie: the ius possidendi cannot be acquired in its own right. This is commonly the case with ownership, where it is recognised that an owner has the derivative right to possession (ius possidendi) in the property he owns. With inferior real rights, the ius possidendi can be granted through a real right in lease or liferent in the property.

=== Remedies available under the real right to possess (ius possidendi) ===
Whilst a general remedy is available to possessors who have been unlawfully deprived of possession, known generally as the action of spuilzie (see below), additional special possessory remedies are granted to the holders of the ius possidendi. These are:

- For corporeal moveables, an action for delivery.
- For corporeal heritable property (land), the action of removal. NB: Removal proceedings are brought where the current possessor never had consent to occupy the land from the ius possidendi rightholder ab initio (ie: from the beginning). This is commonly the case with squatters.
- For corporeal heritable property (land), the action of ejection. NB: Ejection proceedings are brought where the current possessor no longer has consent from the ius possidendi rightholder to occupy the land. This commonly occurs after a commercial tenant remains on the land after the expiration of a lease. Residential leases are dealt with under eviction proceedings in the First Tier Tribunal for Scotland (Housing Chamber).
- For corporeal heritable property (land), the action of trespass. Contrary to popular belief, trespass is a delict in Scots law.

== Property capable of possession ==
=== Corporeal heritable property (land) ===
In order to become a possessor of corporeal heritable property (ie: land), Viscount Stair, the institutional writer, says that:

"He who possessth a field, need not go about it all, or touch every turf of it, by himself or his cattle, but by possessing a part, possesseth the whole, unless there were contrary possessory acts"

This means that under Scots law, where there is a large area of land, continued possession of a single part of the plot of land will allow possession to extend to cover the entire plot, eg: possessing a house extends to possess the gardens that is part of the house's land. However, where there is a contrary possessory acts, such as another individual taking possession, that part of the land will not be considered as falling under the possessor's possession, eg: a squatter takes up camp in the garden of the house with the intent to encamp there, the squatter acquires possession by corpus and animus. The possessor of the house is no longer in possession of the garden.

=== Corporeal moveable property ===
Corporeal moveables, ie: property which can be physically moved such as personal items, furniture, cars etc. can be possessed with an animus and corpus. Possession of corporeal moveable property is relevant in Scots criminal law with criminal offences involving possession; such as those relating to drugs, under the Misuse of Drugs Act 1971, for possession of an illegal substance, or theft. However, it is argued by distinguished Scots law academics such as Gordon that the definition of possession in Scots criminal law is wider than its definition in Scots property law.

=== Incorporeal property ===
Due to the physical requirement of a corpus for possession to occur in Scots law, incorporeal property is not considered capable of possession. However, a real right may still be vested in an individual, such as ownership of the incorporeal thing. Additionally, statutes may create special statutory rights, or quasi real rights, in property, such as intellectual property rights (eg: patents, copyright, trademarks) that have the ability to be 'possessed' in a technical sense, albeit not a legal one due to the absence of corpus.

== Dispossession (spuilzie) and the action of spuilzie ==
=== Spuilzie ===
A spuilzie occurs where a possessor is unlawfully deprived of possession (also termed an unlawful dispossession) of corporeal moveables (ie: physical objects that can be moved) property. An unlawful dispossession is where possession is taken without the consent of the current possessor or without a court order. The word spuilzie is Scots for spoliation. The injured possessor can seek return of the item by an action of spuilzie in Scots law. Viscount Stair, the institutional writer, describes a spuilzie as:

"'the taking away of moveables without consent of the owner or order of law, obliging to restitution of the things taken away, with all possible profits, or to reparation therefor according to the estimation of the injured, made by his juramentum in litem [ie: 'oath in the action'] . Thus, things stolen or robbed ... may be civilly pursued for as spuilzie"

The institutional writer, Erskine, writes that:

"Spuilzie is the taking away or intermeddling with moveable goods in the possession of another, without either the consent of that other, or the order of law. When a spuilzie is committed, action lies against the delinquent, not only for restoring to the former possessor the goods or their value, but for all the profits he might have made of these goods, had it not been for the spuilzie,"

=== Special forms of spuilzie ===
==== Ejection ====
Where a possessor is unlawfully dispossessed of land, this form of an action of spuilzie is known as ejection. A full discussion of ejection is beyond the scope of this article but ejection is different from eviction, which is a legal process commonly used to remove tenants under a lease.

==== Intrusion ====
Where possession is held animo solo (ie: by the mind alone), which commonly occurs when the possessors stops having physical control (corpus) over the property, this form of an action of spuilzie is termed an intrusion.

=== Raising an action of spuilzie ===
The action of spuilzie, as noted by the institutional writers above, is a common law remedy developed by the Scottish courts to address spuilzies. It is a delictual remedy rather than a proprietary remedy as there is no autonomous real right of possession, so is enforceable against the dispossessor/s alone as a personal right in favour of the prior possessor. The availability of such a remedy follows the principle spoliatus ante omnia est restituendus (Latin: 'he who has been despoiled must receive restitution before anything else'), a principle which has been incorporated in Scots law since at least the 13th century. Similar legal remedies exist in other jurisdictions such as the mandament van spolie in South Africa or the tort of conversion in common law jurisdictions.

==== History ====
Spuilzie is one of the oldest legal remedies found in Scots law, and is of continued relevance in modern times. Its earliest origins in Scotland can be found in 1438, when the King's Council developed a legal remedy for robbery and spoliations, later coming to be known as the action of spuilzie. In Roman law, similar remedies existed known as the actio a bonorum raptorum (Latin:'action for goods taken away by force'), the actio furti and possessory interdicts. Lord Bankton, the institutional writer, views the action of spuilzie as a derivative of the Roman possessory interdicts. However, because of the delictual nature of spuilzie it may be seen as a combination of all three remedies. In Canon law, the exceptio spolii was a legal remedy allowing expelled bishops the legal right to recover their possessions.

The remedy was said to have developed because of the lawless nature and instability of the Kingdom of Scotland, as Dr Gow describes:

"[spuilzie] a remedy which appears to have been used for the protection of actual possession and maintenance of the public peace in a country more notable for civil unrest and military punitive expeditions than bourgeois placidity."

An early case can be identified in the 16th century in The Laird of Durie v Duddingstonn (1549) where the court noted that a tenant was dispossessed of corporeal heritable property (land) by being driven from the land by squatters, the landlord could raise an action of spuilzie against the squatters. In the 17th century, actions of spuilzie were at their highest usage. However, over time the usage of actions of spuizlie declined, attributable to the increasing stability of Scottish civic society (leading to less high-value property being unlawful dispossessed).

==== Requirements of an action of spuilzie ====
In order to bring an action of spuilzie against a dispossessor (ie: the person who has unlawfully acquired natural possession), two general requirements must be met:

(1) The prior possessor had acquired possession (see above), and

(2) The prior possessor was unlawfully, also termed vitiously, dispossessed. Unlawful in this sense meaning the taking without consent, or without a court order authorising such takings. Consent by the natural possessor will prevent any claim being brought by a civil possessor.

The pursuer in an action of spuilzie must demonstrate to the court that on the balance of probabilities, these two requirements have been met. Pending further case law on the issue, it is a matter of academic debate if civil possession alone is sufficient to raise an action of spuilzie in relation to corporeal moveables. However it is immaterial in an action of spuilzie whether the prior possessor had acquired possession lawfully/unlawfully. The remedy is therefore considered to be open to all possessors of land and natural possessors of corporeal moveables, including those who acquired possession themselves unlawfully (such as a thief) and can even be used against the owner of property too. As Lord Bankton, the institutional writer notes:

"The pursuer's title, in an action of spuilie [sic], is possession of the goods ... and if the possession was peaceable, even the true owner, seizing the goods from the possessor, will be liable in a spuilie ... The party that is violently deprived of the possession must be first restored, and then the question of property considered ..."

However, in practice an owner of property can concurrently raise proceedings of an action of vindication (rei vindicatio) or similar proceedings to recover ownership of the property so the use of an action of spuilzie is limited against an owner. Yet, in theory, it is legally valid to raise an action of spuilzie against an owner as spuilzie focuses on possession alone.

==== Remedies available ====
There are two broad remedies available to a pursuer in an action of spuilzie. These are:

===== Return of the property =====
As the institutional writers above mention, the main remedy available under an action of spuilzie is the return (termed restitution) of the property from the dispossessor to the prior possessor.

===== Compensation =====
Again, as the institutional writers above mention, compensation of all possible profit are also available to the prior possessor. Two forms of profits are available. The first is ordinary profits, these are payable in respect of any profits made from the property (such as fruits, crops, young, rents etc.) The second form of damages, termed by the institutional writers as violent profits are a general exception that Scots law does not allow for punitive damages. Violent profits are determined by the highest possible level of income that a property can make. Special forms of violent profits are available in relation to ejections of unlawful possessors of land.

==== Modern usage of actions of spuilzie ====
As discussed above, spuilzie has fallen into decline in modern times, with no known express action of spuilzie being reported in over two hundred years since Stove v Colvin (1831). The remedy had been considered extinct by operation of desuetude and contrary use due its low usage. However, as the action of spuilzie has not been expressly abolished it remains a valid legal remedy in Scots law. The Scottish Law Commission, in its memorandum on corporeal moveable remedies (SLC Memorandum No 31, 1976), expressed the following view on spuilzie:

"We think that the action of spuilzie provided useful redress in promptly restoring a person who had been wrongfully deprived of or excluded from possession, and also in giving violent profits in appropriate cases. However, the invocation of ancient remedies of uncertain scope is not necessarily the ideal solution for modern wrongs. It seems to us that the delict of spuilzie, of uncertain competence and scope, should probably be expressly abolished, and consideration be given to what, if any, action or actions should be introduced in its place."

Other reforms have been called for regarding legislation on its usage or express abolition of the common-law remedy altogether. However, it has been noted that the use of spuilzie may have modern efficacy in relations to natural possessors of property under hire-purchase agreements, where the natural possessor will often have no legal right of ownership to the hired property. To date, no reforms of spuilzie have taken place by the Scottish Parliament, so the raising of an action of spuilzie remains valid.

== Application of possession in Scots law ==
The concept of possession extends beyond Scots property law and is applicable in a variety of legal settings. These include:

- Possession is a necessary requirement for the operation of positive prescription.
- One year's possession is a necessary requirement for an application for a prescriptive claim.
- Possession is a necessary requirement for the operation of original acquisition of property by occupatio.
- The real right of lease requires possession in order to register it under the Registration of Leases Act 1880.
- Possession is relevant in Scots criminal law in relation to a range of possessory offences such as possession of unlawful substances under the Misuse of Drugs Act 1971.
