= List of acts of the Parliament of Scotland from 1469 =

This is a list of acts of the Parliament of Scotland for the year 1469.

It lists acts of Parliament of the old Parliament of Scotland, that was merged with the old Parliament of England to form the Parliament of Great Britain, by the Union with England Act 1707 (c. 7).

For other years, see list of acts of the Parliament of Scotland. For the period after 1707, see list of acts of the Parliament of Great Britain.

== 1469 ==
The 5th parliament of James III of Scotland, was held in Edinburgh from the 20 November 1469 to 29 November 1469.

Short title, or popular name	Citation	Royal assent
Long title
Church Act 1469 (repealed)	1469 c. 1 (Note: This is the citation in the Record Edition.); 1469 c. 25 (Note: This is the citation in the Duodecimal Edition.)	27 November 1469
Of the fredome of halye kirk. Of the freedom of the holy church. (Repealed by Statute Law Revision (Scotland) Act 1906 (6 Edw. 7. c. 38))
Sheriffs Act 1469 (repealed)	1469 c. 2; 1469 c. 26	27 November 1469
Of schireffis and uthir Jugis ordinaris quhilkis wil nocht minister Justice to the pure pepil. Of sheriffs and other Judges ordinary who do not administer Justice to the poor people. (Repealed by Statute Law Revision (Scotland) Act 1906 (6 Edw. 7. c. 38))
Reversion Act 1469 (Note: Ceases to have effect under the Title Conditions (Scotland) Act 2003 (asp 9), but not repealed.)	1469 c. 3; 1469 c. 27	27 November 1469
Tuiching the new Inventionis of selling of landis be chartir and sesing and takin again of reversions. Touching the new inventions of selling lands by charter and sasine, and taking them back by reversions.
Prescription Act 1469 (repealed)	1469 c. 4; 1469 c. 28	27 November 1469
Anent the prescriptioun of obligationis nocht folowit within the space of fourty yeris. About the prescription of obligations not followed within the space of forty years. (Repealed by Prescription and Limitation (Scotland) Act 1973 (c. 52))
Officers of Burghs Act 1469 (repealed)	1469 c. 5; 1469 c. 29	27 November 1469
Anent the electioune of aldermen bailyis and uthiris officiaris of burowis. About the election of aldermen, bailies and other officers of burghs. (Repealed by Statute Law Revision (Scotland) Act 1906 (6 Edw. 7. c. 38))
Notaries Act 1469 (repealed)	1469 c. 6; 1469 c. 30	27 November 1469
Of notaris and tabellionis. Of notaries and tabellions. (Repealed by Statute Law Revision (Scotland) Act 1906 (6 Edw. 7. c. 38))
Measures of Cloth Act 1469 (repealed)	1469 c. 7; 1469 c. 31	27 November 1469
Of the metting of wolin claith be the rig and nocht be the selwich. Of the measuring of woollen cloth by the rig and not by the selvage. (Repealed by Statute Law Revision (Scotland) Act 1906 (6 Edw. 7. c. 38))
Brieves Act 1469 (repealed)	1469 c. 8; 1469 c. 32	27 November 1469
Of the indorsing of the kingis brevis and letteris. Of the endorsement of the king's brieves and letters. (Repealed by Statute Law Revision (Scotland) Act 1906 (6 Edw. 7. c. 38))
Constables' Fees Act 1469 (repealed)	1469 c. 9; 1469 c. 33	27 November 1469
Of the takin of feis be constablis of castellis schireffis and bailyeis of burowis at faris parliament tymes and generale counsalis. Of the taking of fees by constables of castles, sheriffs and bailies of burghs at fairs, parliament times, and general councils. (Repealed by Statute Law Revision (Scotland) Act 1906 (6 Edw. 7. c. 38))
Tenants Act 1469 (repealed)	1469 c. 10; 1469 c. 34	27 November 1469
Anent the punding for malis and incasting and owtcasting of tennandis at witsunday or martymes. Of the poinding for mails and taking in and casting out of tenants at Whitsunday or Martinmas. (Repealed by Statute Law Revision (Scotland) Act 1906 (6 Edw. 7. c. 38))
Murder Act 1469 (repealed)	1469 c. 11; 1469 c. 35	27 November 1469
Of slachteris of forethocht felony and of sudante and of the immunite of haly kirk and girth. Of murder of forethought and suddenly, and of the immunity of the holy church and girth. (Repealed by Statute Law Revision (Scotland) Act 1906 (6 Edw. 7. c. 38))
Diligence Act 1469 still in force	1469 c. 12; 1469 c. 36	27 November 1469
Anent the distrenying of tenandis for the lordis dettis. About enforcing against tenants for their lord's debts.
Salmon and Trout Act 1469 (repealed)	1469 c. 13; 1469 c. 37	27 November 1469
For the multiplicacioune of fisch salmonde grilses and trowtis. For the multiplication of fish, salmon, grilse and trout. (Repealed by Statute Law Revision (Scotland) Act 1906 (6 Edw. 7. c. 38))
Continuation of Parliament Act 1469 (repealed)	1469 c. 14; 1469 c. 38	27 November 1469
Anent the continuatiounis of the court of parliament and uthir courtis. Regarding the continuation of the court of parliament and other courts. (Repealed by Statute Law Revision (Scotland) Act 1906 (6 Edw. 7. c. 38))
Holy Days Act 1469 (repealed)	1469 c. 15 — (Note: This act is not listed in the Duodecimal Edition.)	27 November 1469
Anent haly dayis. About holy days. (Repealed by General Assembly Act 1592 (c. 8))
Hospitals Act 1469 (repealed)	1469 c. 16 —	27 November 1469
Anent the executione of the act (Note: Hospitals Act 1466 (c. 13)) for the reformacione of hospitalis. Regarding the execution of the act for the reformation of hospitals. (Repealed by Statute Law Revision (Scotland) Act 1906 (6 Edw. 7. c. 38))
Ferries Act 1469 (repealed)	1469 c. 17 —	27 November 1469
Anent the executione of the statute (Note: Ferries Act 1467 (October 1467 c. 3)) for the making of briggis at the ferryis. Regarrding the execution of the statute for the making of bridges at the ferries. (Repealed by Statute Law Revision (Scotland) Act 1906 (6 Edw. 7. c. 38))
Registers Act 1469 (repealed)	1469 c. 18; 1469 c. 39	27 November 1469
Anent putting the Kingis Rollis and Registir in bukis. Regarding putting the King's Rolls and Register in books. (Repealed by Statute Law Revision (Scotland) Act 1906 (6 Edw. 7. c. 38))
Currency and Coining Act 1469 (repealed)	1469 c. 19; 1469 c. 40	27 November 1469
Of blac mone of uthir realmes and counterfetis of the kingis blac mone. Of black money of other realms and counterfeits of the King's black money. (Repealed by Statute Law Revision (Scotland) Act 1906 (6 Edw. 7. c. 38))
Remit to Committee Act 1469 (repealed)	1469 c. 20; 1480 c. 115	27 November 1469
The personis to quhom the thre estatis hes committit ful power to auise commone and refer again to the next parliament of certane materis viz the inbringing of bullion—the reductione of the kingis lawis—the reformatione of mane sworne athis—and uthir articlis. The persons to whom the three estates have committed full power to advise, debate and refer again to the next parliament on certain matters, which are the importation of bullion; the reduction of the king's laws; the reformation of sworn oaths; and other articles. (Repealed by Statute Law Revision (Scotland) Act 1906 (6 Edw. 7. c. 38))
Not public and general	1469 c. 21 —	27 November 1469
Ratification of an Indult and previlege grantit by the pape to the bischopis of Sanctandrois to conferme the persouns chosin be abbotis or priouris within the diocy of Sanct Androis. Ratification of an Indult and privilege granted by the pope to the bishops of St Andrews to confirm the persons chosen by abbots or priors within the diocese of St Andrews.

=== Sources ===
- Alexander, William (1841). "Acta Parliamentorum Regis Jacobi Tertii". An Abridgement of the Acts of the Parliaments of Scotland. Edinburgh: Adam and Charles Black. p. 443 – via Google Books.
- Alexander, William (1841). "Acta Parliamentorum Regis Jacobi Tertii". An Abridgement of the Acts of the Parliaments of Scotland. Edinburgh: Adam and Charles Black. p. 443 – via Google Books.
- Chronological Table of the Statutes. London: Her Majesty's Stationery Office. 1972. pp. 1320–1321 – via Google Books.
- "Acts of the Old Scottish Parliament: 1469". legislation.gov.uk. The National Archives.
- "Index of Statutes: James III (1460-1488)". Records of the Parliaments of Scotland to 1707. University of St Andrews.

== See also ==
- List of legislation in the United Kingdom
- Records of the Parliaments of Scotland
