= List of acts of the Parliament of Scotland from 1474 =

This is a list of acts of the Parliament of Scotland for the year 1474.

It lists acts of Parliament of the old Parliament of Scotland, that was merged with the old Parliament of England to form the Parliament of Great Britain, by the Union with England Act 1707 (c. 7).

For other years, see list of acts of the Parliament of Scotland. For the period after 1707, see list of acts of the Parliament of Great Britain.

== 1474 ==
The 7th parliament of James III.

Short title, or popular name	Citation	Royal assent
Long title
Church Act 1474 (repealed)	1474 c. 1 (Note: This is the citation in the Record Edition.) — (Note: This act is not listed in the Duodecimal Edition.)	9 May 1474
Of the fredome of halykirk. Of the freedom of the holy church. (Repealed by Statute Law Revision (Scotland) Act 1906 (6 Edw. 7. c. 38))
Embassy to England Act 1474 (repealed)	1474 c. 2 —	9 May 1474
Of an ambassat to be sende in Ingland for redres of the barge and uthir attemptis. Of an embassy to be sent to England for redress of the barge and other attempts. (Repealed by Statute Law Revision (Scotland) Act 1906 (6 Edw. 7. c. 38))
Commission to Denmark Act 1474 (repealed)	1474 c. 3 —	9 May 1474
Of a commission to be sende till the king of Denmark. (Note: Christian I of Denmark.); Of a commission to be sent to the king of Denmark. (Repealed by Statute Law Revision (Scotland) Act 1906 (6 Edw. 7. c. 38))
Money and Bullion Act 1474 (repealed)	1474 c. 4; 1474 c. 50 (Note: This is the citation in the Duodecimal Edition.)	9 May 1474
Anent the mone and the inbringyne of bulyeone. Regarding the money, and the importation of bullion. (Repealed by Statute Law Revision (Scotland) Act 1906 (6 Edw. 7. c. 38))
Artillery Act 1474 (repealed)	1474 c. 5 —	9 May 1474
Anentis the cartis of weir. Regarding the carts of war. (Repealed by Statute Law Revision (Scotland) Act 1906 (6 Edw. 7. c. 38))
Tutors Act 1474 (repealed)	1474 c. 6; 1474 c. 51	9 May 1474
Anent the breif of tutorie. Regarding the brieve of tutory. (Repealed by Age of Legal Capacity (Scotland) Act 1991 (c. 50))
Arrestments Act 1474 (repealed)	1474 c. 7; 1474 c. 52	9 May 1474
Anent the pruving of arestmentis. Regarding the proving of arrestments. (Repealed by Statute Law Revision (Scotland) Act 1906 (6 Edw. 7. c. 38))
Moveable Succession Act 1474 (repealed)	1474 c. 8; 1474 c. 53	9 May 1474
Anent the aierschipe of movabill gudis of baronis gentilmen and frehaldaris. Concerning the inheritance of moveable goods of barons, gentlemen and freeholders. (Repealed by Statute Law Revision (Scotland) Act 1906 (6 Edw. 7. c. 38))
Prescription Act 1474 (repealed)	1474 c. 9; 1474 c. 54	9 May 1474
Anentis the Act of prescripcione of obligacionis. Regarding the Act of prescription of obligations. (Repealed by Prescription and Limitation (Scotland) Act 1973 (c. 52))
Brieves of Inquest Act 1474 (repealed)	1474 c. 10; 1474 c. 55	9 May 1474
Anent the awail of landis to be answerde in the Retour of the breifis of Inquest. Regarding the value of lands to be answered in the Retour of the brieves of Inquest. (Repealed by Statute Law Revision (Scotland) Act 1906 (6 Edw. 7. c. 38))
Civil Causes Act 1474 (repealed)	1474 c. 11 —	9 May 1474
That complayntis be first persewit to the Juge ordinar. That complaints be first pursued to the Judge ordinary. (Repealed by Statute Law Revision (Scotland) Act 1906 (6 Edw. 7. c. 38))
Burgh Councils Act 1474 (repealed)	1474 c. 12; 1474 c. 56	9 May 1474
Anent the consale to be chosin in burowis. Regarding the council to be chosen in burghs. (Repealed by Statute Law Revision (Scotland) Act 1906 (6 Edw. 7. c. 38))
Entry to Lands Act 1474 (repealed)	1474 c. 13; 1474 c. 57	9 May 1474
Anent ourlordis that fraudfully deferris till enter to thair landis. Regarding overlords who fraudulently defer entry to their lands. (Repealed by Statute Law Revision (Scotland) Act 1906 (6 Edw. 7. c. 38))
Apprehension of Criminals Act 1474 (repealed)	1474 c. 14; 1474 c. 58	9 May 1474
Anent the apprehending of persons arrestit to the Justice ayr. Of the apprehending of persons arrested by the justice ayre. (Repealed by Statute Law Revision (Scotland) Act 1906 (6 Edw. 7. c. 38))
Stealing Hawks and Hounds Act 1474 (repealed)	1474 c. 15; 1474 c. 59	9 May 1474
Anent the steling of haukis hundis, &c. About the stealing of hawks, hounds, etc. (Repealed by Statute Law Revision (Scotland) Act 1906 (6 Edw. 7. c. 38))
Deers and Rabbits Act 1474 (repealed)	1474 c. 16; 1474 c. 60	9 May 1474
Anent the hunting and slaing of dais and rays and the taking of cunnyngis, &c. Regarding the hunting and slaying of deer and roes, and the taking of rabbits, etc. (Repealed by Statute Law Revision (Scotland) Act 1906 (6 Edw. 7. c. 38))
Ferries Act 1474 (repealed)	1474 c. 17; 1474 c. 61	9 May 1474
Of the fraucht to be takin be feriaris. Of the fares to be taken by ferries. (Repealed by Statute Law Revision (Scotland) Act 1906 (6 Edw. 7. c. 38))
Continuation of Parliament Act 1474 (repealed)	1474 c. 18 —	9 May 1474
Continuation of the Parliament—and the power of the thre estatis committit to certane personis. Continuation of the Parliament; and the power of the three estates committed to certain persons. (Repealed by Statute Law Revision (Scotland) Act 1906 (6 Edw. 7. c. 38))

=== Sources ===
- Alexander, William (1841). "Acta Parliamentorum Regis Jacobi Tertii". An Abridgement of the Acts of the Parliaments of Scotland. Edinburgh: Adam and Charles Black. p. 444 – via Google Books.
- Alexander, William (1841). "Acta Parliamentorum Regis Jacobi Tertii". An Abridgement of the Acts of the Parliaments of Scotland. Edinburgh: Adam and Charles Black. p. 444 – via Google Books.
- Chronological Table of the Statutes. London: Her Majesty's Stationery Office. 1972. p. 1321 – via Google Books.
- "Acts of the Old Scottish Parliament: 1474". legislation.gov.uk. The National Archives.
- "Index of Statutes: James III (1460-1488)". Records of the Parliaments of Scotland to 1707. University of St Andrews.

== See also ==
- List of legislation in the United Kingdom
- Records of the Parliaments of Scotland
