= Titles to Land Consolidation (Scotland) Act 1868 =

Act of the Parliament of the United Kingdom

Titles to Land Consolidation (Scotland) Act 1868 (Note: Section 1.)
- Act of Parliament
- Parliament of the United Kingdom
- Long title: An Act to consolidate the Statutes relating to the Constitution and Completion of Titles to Heritable Property in Scotland, and to make certain Changes in the Law of Scotland relating to Heritable Rights.
- Citation: 31 & 32 Vict. c. 101
- Territorial extent: United Kingdom

Dates
- Royal assent: 31 July 1868
- Commencement: 31 December 1868 (Note: Section 2.)
Other legislation
| Amends | See § Repealed enactments |
| Repeals/revokes | See § Repealed enactments |
| Amended by | Titles to Land Consolidation (Scotland) Amendment Act 1869; Conveyancing (Scotland) Act 1874; Statute Law Revision Act 1875; Statute Law Revision Act 1883; Conveyancing (Scotland) Acts (1874 and 1879) Amendment Act 1887; Statute Law Revision (No. 2) Act 1893; Feudal Casualties (Scotland) Act 1914; Conveyancing (Scotland) Act 1924; Burgh Registers (Scotland) Act 1926; Conveyancing Amendment (Scotland) Act 1938; Statute Law Revision Act 1950; Public Registers and Records (Scotland) Act 1950; Mental Health (Scotland) Act 1960; Succession (Scotland) Act 1964; Conveyancing and Feudal Reform (Scotland) Act 1970; Sheriff Courts (Scotland) Act 1971; Local Government (Scotland) Act 1973; Statute Law (Repeals) Act 1975; Land Registration (Scotland) Act 1979; Law Reform (Miscellaneous Provisions) (Scotland) Act 1980; Statute Law (Repeals) Act 1981; Bankruptcy (Scotland) Act 1985; Law Reform (Miscellaneous Provisions) (Scotland) Act 1985; Statute Law (Repeals) Act 1986; Debtors (Scotland) Act 1987; Age of Legal Capacity (Scotland) Act 1991; Requirements of Writing (Scotland) Act 1995; Statute Law (Repeals) Act 1995; Abolition of Feudal Tenure etc. (Scotland) Act 2000; Title Conditions (Scotland) Act 2003; Bankruptcy and Diligence etc. (Scotland) Act 2007; Land Registration etc. (Scotland) Act 2012 |

Status: Partially repealed

Text of statute as originally enacted

Revised text of statute as amended

Text of the Titles to Land Consolidation (Scotland) Act 1868 as in force today (including any amendments) within the United Kingdom, from legislation.gov.uk.

The Titles to Land Consolidation (Scotland) Act 1868 (31 & 32 Vict. c. 101) is an act of the Parliament of the United Kingdom that consolidated enactments related to the constitution and completion of titles to heritable property in Scotland.

== Provisions ==
=== Repealed enactments ===
Section 4 of the act repealed 11 enactments, listed in no. 1 of schedule (A.) to the act.

| Citation | Short title | Description | Extent of repeal |
|---|---|---|---|
| 8 & 9 Vict. c. 31 | Heritable Securities for Debt (Scotland) Act 1845 | An Act to facilitate the Transmission and Extinction of Heritable Securities for Debt in Scotland. | The whole act. |
| 8 & 9 Vict. c. 35 | Infeftment Act 1845 | An Act to simplify the Form and diminish the Expense of obtaining infeftment in Heritable Property in Scotland. | Section sixth in the copy No. 2. of this schedule. |
| 10 & 11 Vict. c. 47 | Service of Heirs (Scotland) Act 1847 | An Act to amend the Law and Practice in Scotland as to the Service of Heirs. | The whole act. |
| 10 & 11 Vict. c. 48 | Transference of Lands (Scotland) Act 1847 | An Act to facilitate the Transference of Lands and other Heritages in Scotland not held in Burgage Tenure. | The whole act. |
| 10 & 11 Vict. c. 49 | Transference of Lands (Burgage Tenure) (Scotland) Act 1847 | An Act to facilitate the Transference of Lands and other Heritages in Scotland held in Burgage Tenure. | The whole act. |
| 10 & 11 Vict. c. 50 | Heritable Securities for Debt (Scotland) Act 1847 | An Act to facilitate the Constitution and Transmission of Heritable Securities for Debt in Scotland, and to render the same more effectual for the Recovery of Debts. | The whole act. |
| 10 & 11 Vict. c. 51 | Crown Charters (Scotland) Act 1847 | An Act to amend the Practice in Scotland with regard to Crown Charters and Precepts from Chancery. | The whole act. |
| 13 & 14 Vict. c. 13 | Religious Bodies (Property) (Scotland) Act 1850 | An Act to render more simple and effectual the Titles by which Congregations or Societies associated for Purposes of Religious Worship or Education in Scotland to hold Real Property required for such Purposes. | The whole act. |
| 17 & 18 Vict. c. 62 | Heritable Securities (Scotland) Act 1854 | An Act to extend the Benefits of Two Acts of Her Majesty relating to the Constitution, Transmission, and Extinction of Heritable Securities in Scotland. | The whole act. |
| 21 & 22 Vict. c. 76 | Titles to Land (Scotland) Act 1858 | An Act to simplify the Forms and diminish the Expense of completing Titles to Land in Scotland. | The whole act. |
| 23 & 24 Vict. c. 143 | Titles to Land (Scotland) Act 1860 | An Act to extend certain Provisions of the Titles to Land (Scotland) Act, 1858, to Titles to Land held by Burgage Tenure, and to amend the said Act. | The whole act. |

== Subsequent developments ==
Section 39 of the act was repealed by section 1(1) of, and the first schedule to, the Statute Law Revision Act 1950 (14 Geo. 6. c. 6), which came into force on 23 May 1950.

Sections 52, 54, 55, 151 and 153 and in section 162, the words " It shall be lawful for " and the words from " from time to time " to " such burgh; and the said Court ", were repealed by section 1(1) of, and part XIV of the schedule to, the Statute Law (Repeals) Act 1975, which came into force on 13 March 1975.
