= Land registration (Scots law) =

Legal process for land ownership in Scotland

Land registration in Scots law is a system of public registration of land, and associated real rights. Scotland has one of the oldest systems of land registration in the world. Registration of deeds is important as it constitutes the third stage of the creation and transfer of real rights.

Following the enactment of the Registration Act 1617 by the Parliament of the Kingdom of Scotland, feudal grants and dispositions were required to be registered in the General Register of Sasines in order to give the proprietor right of ownership. These registration requirements survived along with Scots law's independence, following the constitution of the Kingdom of Great Britain, the Acts of Union 1707, and the subsequent creation of the United Kingdom in 1800 and 1922.

Today, public registration is still required in order to validly transfer real rights in Scots law. The public land registers are now entrusted to the Registers of Scotland (RoS), an agency of the Scottish Government tasked with compiling and maintaining records relating to property and other legal documents. The executive of this agency is known as the Keeper of the Registers of Scotland, often termed simply the Keeper, who is currently Jennifer Henderson. The RoS currently maintain 20 public registers relating to land and other legal documents.

== History of public land registration in Scotland ==
Registration Act 1617
- Act of Parliament
- Parliament of Scotland
- Long title: Anent the Registratione of reuersiones Seasingis and vtheris writis.
- Citation: 1617 c. 16
- Territorial extent: Scotland

Dates
- Royal assent: 28 June 1617
Other legislation
Amended by	Statute Law Revision (Scotland) Act 1906; Title Conditions (Scotland) Act 2003

Status: Amended

Revised text of statute as amended

After the introduction of the feudal system of land tenure in Scotland under the Davidian Revolution, formal ceremonies were conducted on the land itself by a sasine ceremony, where an owner gives sasine to another (from the Old French seiser, "to seize"). Dating from at least 1248, a sasine ceremony involved the handing over of soil or other symbols, publicly showing the transfer of ownership of the land from one person to another. The Registration Act 1617 stipulated that the instrument of sasine required registration in order to create real rights:

"HIS Maiestie with aduyis and consent of the estaittis of Parliament statutes and ordanis That thair salbe ane publick Register In the whiche all Reuersiounes regresses bandis and writtis for making of reuersiounes or regresses assignatiounes thairto dischargis of the same renunciatiounes of wodsettis and grantis off redemptioun and siclyik all instrumentis of seasing salbe registrat . . ."

Few other European countries introduced any form of registration until the 19th century, and some areas in England and Wales had no system of public registration until 1990. The result of the Registration Act 1617 was the creation of the Register of Sasines, which was one of the most advanced systems of land registration at the time in Europe. The Register of Sasines operated by the public registration of deeds transferring land, such as feudal grants and dispositions, in order to make certain the right of ownership under the 1617 act.

=== 19th-20th century ===
Infeftment Act 1845 (Note: The citation of this act by this short title was authorised by section 1 of, and the first schedule to, the Short Titles Act 1896. Due to the repeal of those provisions it is now authorised by section 19(2) of the Interpretation Act 1978.)
- Act of Parliament
- Parliament of the United Kingdom
- Long title: An Act to simplify the Form and diminish the Expence of obtaining Infeftment in Heritable Property in Scotland.
- Citation: 8 & 9 Vict. c. 35
- Territorial extent: United Kingdom

Dates
- Royal assent: 21 July 1845
- Commencement: 21 July 1845 (Note: The Acts of Parliament (Commencement) Act 1793.)
- Repealed: 28 November 2004 (Note: The Abolition of Feudal Tenure etc. (Scotland) Act 2000 (Commencement No. 2) (Appointed Day) Order 2003 (SSI 2003/456).)
Other legislation
Amended by	Titles to Land Consolidation (Scotland) Act 1868; Statute Law Revision Act 1875; Statute Law Revision Act 1892; Statute Law Revision Act 1893; Requirements of Writing (Scotland) Act 1995
Repealed by	Abolition of Feudal Tenure etc. (Scotland) Act 2000

Status: Repealed

Text of statute as originally enacted

Revised text of statute as amended

During the 19th century, important reforms were made to the Sasine process. The Infeftment Act 1845 (8 & 9 Vict. c. 35) removed the requirement of carrying out the giving sasine ceremony. The Titles to Land Consolidation (Scotland) Act 1868 (31 & 32 Vict. c. 101) also provided that the instrument of sasine (the deed recording the ceremony) was no longer necessary, with the conveyance [contained in a formal document, the disposition] itself being registrable.

==== Repealed enactments ====
Section 4 of the act repealed 11 enactments, listed in schedule (A.) to the act.

Citation	Short title	Description	Extent of repeal
8 & 9 Vict. c. 31	Heritable Securities (Scotland) Act 1845	An Act to facilitate the Transmission and Extinction of Heritable Securities for Debt in Scotland.	The whole act.
8 & 9 Vict. c. 35	Infeftment Act 1845	An Act to simplify the Form and diminish the Expense of obtaining infeftment in Heritable Property in Scotland.	Section Sixth in the Copy No. 2. of this Schedule.
10 & 11 Vict. c. 47	Service of Heirs (Scotland) Act 1847	An Act to amend the Law and Practice in Scotland as to the Service of Heirs.	The whole act.
10 & 11 Vict. c. 48	Transference of Lands (Scotland) Act 1847	An Act to facilitate the Transference of Lands and other Heritages in Scotland not held in Burgage Tenure.	The whole act.
10 & 11 Vict. c. 49	Transference of Lands (Scotland) (No. 2) Act 1847	An Act to facilitate the Transference of Lands and other Heritages in Scotland held in Burgage Tenure.	The whole act.
10 & 11 Vict. c. 50	Heritable Securities (Scotland) Act 1847	An Act to facilitate the Constitution and Transmission of Heritable Securities for Debt in Scotland, and to render the same more effectual for the Recovery of Debts.	The whole act.
10 & 11 Vict. c. 51	Crown Charters (Scotland) Act 1847	An Act to amend the Practice in Scotland with regard to Crown Charters and Precepts from Chancery.	The whole act.
13 & 14 Vict. c. 13	Religious Congregations, etc. (Scotland) Act 1850	An Act to render more simple and effectual the Titles by which Congregations or Societies associated for Purposes of Religious Worship or Education in Scotland to hold Real Property required for such Purposes.	The whole act.
17 & 18 Vict. c. 62	Heritable Securities (Scotland) Act 1854	All Act to extend the Benefits of Two Acts of Her Majesty relating to the Constitution, Transmission, and Extension of Heritable Securities in Scotland.	The whole act.
21 & 22 Vict. c. 76	Titles to Land (Scotland) Act 1858	An Act to simplify the Forms and diminish the Expense of completing Titles to Land in Scotland.	The whole act.
23 & 24 Vict. c. 143	Titles to Land (Scotland) Act 1860	An Act to extend certain Provisions of the Titles to Land (Scotland) Act, 1858, to Titles to Land held by Burgage Tenure, and to amend the said Act.	The whole act.

==== Subsequent developments ====
Land Registration (Scotland) Act 1979 (Note: Section 30(1).)
- Act of Parliament
- Parliament of the United Kingdom
- Long title: An Act to provide a system of registration of interests in land in Scotland in place of the recording of deeds in the Register of Sasines; and for indemnification in respect of registered interests in land; to simplify certain deeds relating to land and to provide as to the effect of certain other such deeds; to enable tenants-at-will to acquire their landlords' interests in the tenancies; to provide for the fixing of fees payable to the Keeper of the Registers of Scotland; and for connected purposes.
- Citation: 1979 c. 33
- Territorial extent: Scotland

Dates
- Royal assent: 4 April 1979
- Commencement: Various (Note: Section 30(2).)
Other legislation
Amends	Miners' Welfare Act 1952; Petroleum Act 1998
Amended by	Statute Law (Repeals) Act 1981; Civil Aviation Act 1982; Law Reform (Miscellaneous Provisions) (Scotland) Act 1985; Housing (Scotland) Act 1987; Coal Industry Act 1994; Abolition of Feudal Tenure etc. (Scotland) Act 2000

Status: Partially repealed

Text of statute as originally enacted

Revised text of statute as amended

The passage of the Land Registers (Scotland) Act 1868 further reformed the General Register of Sasines, introducing a sorting system for deeds by the counties in Scotland. Search sheets, listing the deeds registered for a property, were also introduced to simplify the registration and search process. However, by this stage, due to the developments in cartography, many legal systems such as Australia and Germany began to use "title registration", or the Torrens System, based on maps of the land outlining plots. The General Register of Sasines, in contrast, relied on deeds alone and the extent of the land transferred was narrated in the deed. This made it difficult in practice to identify what exactly had been transferred, especially with deeds using historic measurement units. The General Register of Sasines began to appear outdated, and even by 1900 the debate had commenced in Scots law about its replacement. The final legislation to introduce a new map-based system was the Land Registration (Scotland) Act 1979 (c. 33) which introduced a map-based Land Register of Scotland.

The 1979 act provided that each county of General Register of Sasines would transfer over to the new Land Register. The 'live' date for each county was:

1. Renfrew – 6 April 1981
2. Dumbarton – 4 October 1982
3. Lanark – 3 January 1984
4. The Barony and Regality of Glasgow – 30 September 1985
5. Clackmannan – 1 October 1992
6. Stirling – 1 April 1993
7. West Lothian – 1 October 1993
8. Fife – 1 April 1995
9. Aberdeen – 1 April 1996
10. Kincardine – 1 April 1996
11. Ayr – 1 April 1997
12. Dumfries – 1 April 1997
13. Kirkcudbright – 1 April 1997
14. Wigtown – 1 April 1997
15. Angus – 1 April 1999
16. Kinross – 1 April 1999
17. Perth – 1 April 1999
18. Berwick – 1 October 1999
19. East Lothian – 1 October 1999
20. Peebles – 1 October 1999
21. Roxburgh – 1 October 1999
22. Selkirk – 1 October 1999
23. Argyll – 1 April 2000
24. Bute – 1 April 2000
25. Midlothian – 1 April 2001
26. Inverness – 1 April 2002
27. Nairn – 1 April 2002
28. Banff – 1 April 2003
29. Caithness – 1 April 2003
30. Moray – 1 April 2003
31. Orkney & Zetland – 1 April 2003
32. Ross & Cromarty – 1 April 2003
33. Sutherland – 1 April 2003
34. The Seabed of Scotland – 8 December 2014 (this was only introduced following the passage of the Land Registration (Scotland) Act 2012).

Land Registration etc. (Scotland) Act 2012 (Note: Section 124.)
- Act of the Scottish Parliament
- Scottish Parliament
- Long title: An Act of the Scottish Parliament to reform and restate the law on the registration of rights to land in the land register; to enable electronic conveyancing and registration of electronic documents in the land register; to provide for the closure of the Register of Sasines in due course; to make provision about the functions of the Keeper of the Registers of Scotland; to allow electronic documents to be used for certain contracts, unilateral obligations and trusts that must be constituted by writing; to provide about the formal validity of electronic documents and for their registration; and for connected purposes.
- Citation: 2012 asp 5
- Territorial extent: Scotland

Dates
- Royal assent: 10 July 2012
- Commencement: Various (Note: Section 123.)
Other legislation
Amends	Titles to Land Consolidation (Scotland) Act 1868; Trusts (Scotland) Act 1921; Water (Scotland) Act 1980; Litter Act 1983; Housing Associations Act 1985; Law Reform (Miscellaneous Provisions) (Scotland) Act 1985; Coal Industry Act 1994
Amended by	Co-operative and Community Benefit Societies Act 2014; Economic Crime (Transparency and Enforcement) Act 2022; Economic Crime and Corporate Transparency Act 2023

Status: Amended

Text of statute as originally enacted

Revised text of statute as amended

Following the 'live' date for each county, it was no longer enough to record deeds concerning a property in that county in the General Register of Sasines. Instead a new voluntary application had to be made to the Land Register of Scotland. Over time the Land Register began to be filled as property changed hands, necessitating a new application in the Land Register. Under the Abolition of Feudal Tenure (Scotland) Act 2000, the abolition of feudalism also took place on 28 November 2004, ending the historic feudal nature of the Register of Sasines. However, large swathes of land in Scotland still remained registered in the General Register of Sasines, and this, coupled with the working problems of the 1979 act, led to the Scottish Law Commission's Report on Land Registration (2010, SLC Report 222). The result of this report was the recommendation of the wholesale reform of the Land Register. The recommendations of the report were accepted by the Scottish Government and the Land Registration etc. (Scotland) Act 2012 was passed by the Scottish Parliament.

== The publicity principle ==
A chief feature of Scots property law is the publicity principle and the legal doctrine surrounding it. The publicity principle requires that in transfers of all property, there is a need for an external (i.e.: public) act in order to create or transfer real rights (or rights in rem). In Scots law, the publicity principle has not been analysed in great detail. However, the Scottish Law Commission have noted that the reliance on the public register provides certainty and security for the parties engaging in the sale of land.

The rationale for the requirement of an external act is subject to academic debate but broadly is recognised that the publicity principles serves the purposes of:

1. providing legal certainty of ownership without reliance on litigation;
2. securing an owner's real right (or right in rem) by way of reference to a recorded public act;
3. protecting third parties who may be unaware of any private agreements an owner may be subject to.

=== The race to the registers ===
Historically in Scotland, it was common for sellers to grant multiple dispositions in one piece of land, often as an attempt to defraud multiple buyers. The passage of the Registration Act 1617 by the estates of parliament of the Kingdom of Scotland was as an attempt to curtail this fraud by placing a registration requirement on transfers of ownership; allowing buyers to rely of the public register. Importantly, the Real Rights Act 1693 provided that dispositions would "rank in order of the date of registration." This legal rule, still in force today, gives rise to the concept of the "race to the registers" in which the disponee (commonly, the buyer following the conclusion of missives of sale) must quickly record the disposition granted to him in the Land Register, thwarting all other potential third-party claims to ownership. The race has been characterised by the distinguished judge, Lord Rodger of Earlsferry as:

a struggle in deadly earnest with the aim of destroying the other competitor's chance to obtain the real right by recording the relevant deed and infefting himself first. Those taking part in this race are no Corinthians and swear no Olympic oath of sportsmanship. If your opponent is slow off the mark, mistakes the way or stumbles, you do not chivalrously wait for him to catch up: you take full advantage of his mistakes. Nice guys finish last and don't get the real right.

In practice, the introduction of Advance Notices under the Land Registration (Scotland) Act 2012 has reduced the "struggle" in the race to the register. However, it still remains valid that only registration in the Land Register is capable of transferring or creating real rights (or rights in rem).

=== Case discussion: Burnett's Trustee's v Grainger [2004] UKHL 8 ===
It has been said that Sharp v Thomson and Burnett's Trustee's v Grainger are the most commentated cases in Scots law in modern times. It was also subject of a Scottish Law Commission Report, which also discusses the decision in Burnett's Trustee's v Grainger [2004] UKHL 8 and its clarification on the registration requirement in Scots corporeal heritable property law.

==== Material facts ====
October 1990

Ms Burnett owned corporeal heritable property (a house) at 94 Malcolm Road in Peterculter, Aberdeenshire. In October 1990, Ms Burnett concluded missives of sale for the sale of the property to sell its to Mr and Mrs Grainger.

November 1990

On 8 November 1990, the date of entry, the purchase price was paid and disposition was delivered to the Graingers to complete the second stage in the transfer of ownership of the house. However, the Graingers' solicitors did not register the disposition in the General Register of Sasines at that point (Aberdeenshire did not enter the Land Register until 1 April 1996). The Grainger's took possession of the house and acted as if they were the legal owners, despite no valid registration of the disposition granted to them.

In the interim, Ms Burnett fell into financial difficulty and was sequestrated (the Scots law term for personal bankruptcy) with the appointment of a trustee-in-sequestration under the Bankruptcy (Scotland) Act 1985. The 1985 Act has been now repealed and replaced by the Bankruptcy (Scotland) Act 2016], one of the largest bills ever passed by the Scottish Parliament.

December 1991

On 10 December 1991, Ms Burnett's trustee (i.e. the court appointed insolvency practitioner managing her estate in sequestration) completed title to the house in Peterculter by way of sending a notice to the Keeper of the Registers of Scotland. The trustee was entered into the title of the house.

January 1992

On 27 January 1992, the Grainger's solicitor finally registered the disposition granted in November 1990 in the Land Registers of Scotland. There were now two individuals claiming ownership of the house in Peterculter: (1) Ms Burnett's trustee (who presumably wanted to retain the property to sell it in order to satisfy her creditors) and (2) The Graingers, who had moved into the house and had believed it to be theirs from the moment they took possession. Ms Burnett's trustee raised an action for declarator in the sheriff court at Aberdeen, in the Sheriffdom of the Grampian, Highland and Island. A 'declarator' is an order of the court whereby a pursuer, the person raising the action, asks the court to declare the existence of a right, obligation by order (i.e. the right is "declared to exist"), in this case, that Ms Burnett's trustee had the right of ownership to the house in Peterculter.

July 1995

On 25 July 1995, the sheriff granted the declarator in favour of Ms Burnett's trustee, that he had ownership of the house in Peterculter. The Graingers appealed to the sheriff principal of the Sheriffdom of Grampian, Highland and Island, D. J. Risk, QC.

August 2000

On 28 August 2000, the sheriff principal held the appeal and found in favour of the Graingers that they had ownership of the property, following the decision of Sharp v Thomson. Ms Burnett's trustee appealed to the Inner House of the Court of Session.

May 2002

On 15 May 2002, the Inner House allowed the appeal of Ms Burnett's trustee that he had ownership to the house. They distinguished the interpretation of Sharp v Thomson to cases of floating charges alone. The Grainger's appealed this decision to the Judicial Committee of the House of Lords, the Law Lords (then the final court of appeal for Scots civil cases, now replaced by the United Kingdom Supreme Court).

March 2004

On 4 March 2004, the House of Lords refused the Grainger's appeal and affirmed the decision of the Inner House. Ownership of the house lay with Ms Burnett's trustee.

==== Case analysis: The Publicity Principle applied ====
The mere fact that this litigation took over 12 years to conclude demonstrates the legal complexities at work in this area. The decision of the House of Lords in Sharp v Thomson had provoked some of the greatest academic response to a case in living memory; and, as a similar case to Sharp, Burnetts Trustee's was also scrutinised. In the appeal to the House of Lords, Lord Rodger of Earlsferry and Lord Hope of Craighead, the Scottish law lords in the House of Lords, gave important judgments concerning the application of the publicity principle. Lord Hope noted:

This simple view of the case tends to suggest that the situation in which the appellants [i.e. the Graingers] now find themselves is unfair. They paid the price for the subjects [i.e. the house in Peterculter] to which they obtained entry in exchange for delivery of the disposition on the date of settlement [i.e. the date of entry]. They are now being told that the subjects are vested in the respondent [i.e. Ms Burnett's Trustee] and that they can no longer acquire a good title to them. [Brackets added]

However, Lord Hope then went on to state the necessity of registration of dispositions:

Registration in the Land Register of Scotland under the Land Registration (Scotland) Act 1979 [see Land Registration (Scotland) Act 2012] has taken the place of the final step, which it was always necessary to take to transfer the real right, of symbolical delivery of the land by sasine and the recording of a notarial instrument or its modern equivalents in the General Register of Sasines. Section 3(1) of the 1979 Act [see s. 50 of the 2012 Act] provides that registration shall have the effect of vesting in the person registered as entitled to the registered interest a real right in the land in so far as the right is capable of being vested as a real right. It preserves the rule that delivery of the disposition does not of itself transfer the real right in the property. That rule applies to every transaction by which ownership in land is passed from one person to another. It is not confined to sale, although it is in contracts for the sale of the land that most transactions which lead to the transfer of ownership in land have their origin. [Underlines and brackets added]

Lord Hope went on to find that the Grainger's had not obtained the real right of ownership because they had not registered the disposition granted to them. Therefore:

The real right in the property of which Mrs Burnett was the beneficial owner remained vested in her at the date when the permanent trustee's notice of title was recorded in the Sasine Register. The only qualifications on that right were of a personal character.

This meant that the Graingers only held a personal right against Ms Burnett's trustee, rather than any real right of ownership in the house at Peterculter itself. Only registration of the disposition would have created the real right; the Graingers did not have ownership of the house despite living in it. Lord Rodger notes:

The decision of the Extra Division [of the Inner House] is correct. But it shocks. It is important not to play down that sense of shock since admitting that the decision shocks, and identifying why, are the keys to explaining why it is also correct. [Underlines and brackets added]

Lord Rodger explains:

At the time when Mrs Burnett was sequestrated, the appellants were disponees to whom the disponer had delivered the disposition but who had not yet recorded it in the register and were accordingly not yet infeft [i.e.: they did not have ownership]. [brackets added]

Because of the nature of the race to the register (see above), this meant that:

...the respondent [Ms Burnett's Trustee] has done nothing more than take advantage of the mistake or error of his rivals, the appellants [the Graingers], in failing to get off their mark and record the disposition from Mrs Burnett promptly. Even once their agents had become aware that her estate had been sequestrated and that the respondent had been appointed as permanent trustee, for whatever reason, they failed to act. In retrospect at least, that was a mistake, since it allowed the respondent to record his notice of title before the appellants. As the authorities show, even although the respondent was well aware that the appellants held a disposition from Mrs Burnett, he was fully entitled to take advantage of their mistake by recording the notice of title and so completing the diligence by acquiring the real right in the subjects for the creditors.[brackets added]

Accordingly, Ms Burnett's trustee had won the race to the register. He had ownership of the property.

== What is land? ==
Corporeal heritable property is immoveable property, that which cannot be moved, such as land and buildings. Land in Scots law is a broader concept than the traditional meaning of land and is taken to mean:

Land Registration (Scotland) Act 2012 s.113:

"land" includes—

- (a) buildings and other structures,
- (b) the seabed of the territorial sea of the United Kingdom adjacent to Scotland (including land within the ebb and flow of the tide at ordinary spring tides), and
- (c) other land covered with water...

Therefore, land, as used in this article and in Scots law, is taken to describe the above; so can include a wide range of immoveable property such as a field or woodland, a house, a loch, or a piece of the Scottish territorial water sea-bed. Ownership of land is a coele usuque ad centrum (from the heavens to the centre of the Earth). This means that an owner of a piece of land in Scotland will own the surface of land, the ground underneath it and the airspace above the property. This also includes any moveable property within the land that has acceded.

=== Ownership of tenements: Legal and conventional ===
The term tenement is often used to describe a type of building shared by multiple dwellings, typically with flats or apartments on each floor and with shared entrance stairway access. This type of residential property is governed by the Tenements (Scotland) Act 2004 and is discussed under the law of the tenement, a subsection of Scots property law relating to flatted properties. However, in Scots property law the term 'tenement' is in wider use and is used to describe both (1) 'legal tenements' and (2) 'conventional separate tenements'.

==== Legal tenements ====
Under feudal law, which operated in Scotland from the Davidian Revolution until 28 November 2004, all land in Scotland was owned by the Crown (i.e.: The King/Queen of Scots, later the King/Queen of Britain, and subsequently the King/Queen of the United Kingdom). Certain rights in the land, called the regalia minora, could be reserved to the Crown when they granted land to a Crown vassal. Today, following the abolition of feudalism, any of the regalia minora that have not been expressly granted to the owner of land through previous grant or another individual as a separate legal tenement, still remains the property of the Crown under the Regalia Minora. Where they have been granted to another individual, the holder of the right is an owner of a 'separate legal tenement', who can be independent to the owner of the land. The current regalia minora rights are:

- Right to fish salmon
- Right to shellfishing (mussels and oysters)
- Right of port
- Right of ferry
- Right to mine gold and silver
- Right to hold fairs and markets
- Right to petroleum and natural gas
- Right to coal

Historically, the following rights were considered part of the regalia minora but are now not considered so:

- The right to fish for white fish
- The right to hunt deer
- The right to kill swans
- The right to the fortalices and castles of Scotland and the right to build fortalices and castles in Scotland.

==== Conventional separate tenements ====
Conventional separate tenements are the division of corporeal property into separate parts, which applies to land both above ground and below ground:

===== Above ground-level =====
Ownership of a building can be separated into tenements, as is the common case with Scottish flatted buildings of the same name. The rules relating to the relationship between separate tenement flats are governed by the Tenements (Scotland) Act 2004 and the law of the Tenement. Ownership of land, other the buildings, can be separated horizontally into tenements. Any corporeal moveable property that has acceded to the land cannot be made into a separate tenement. The division of the airspace above the land into separate tenements (to describe, for example, bridges or unoccupied airspace) is 'unclear' in Scots law.

The Abolition of Feudal Tenure (Scotland) Act 2000 allowed for the preservation of feudal superiors' sporting (fishing and game) rights as a conventional separate tenement to the land, by way of registration of a preservation notice before 28 November 2004. Only 65 of these notices were subsequently registered.

===== Below ground-level =====
Below ground level, the strata of the land can be separated horizontally. The most common type of underground tenement is the separation of minerals from the owners of the surface of the land. Following Graham v Duke of Hamilton, it is settled that ownership of the minerals as a tenement is ownership of the strata of the Earth beneath the land's surface, even where it does not contain minerals.

=== Who can own land? ===
All persons, human and juristic, have rights capacity, i.e. the ability to hold a right. Thus, a person is able to own land in their own right. This derives from the classification of the law of persons found in Roman law. The word 'person' is usually taken to mean a human. However, in Scots law and in many other jurisdictions, the term is also used to describe corporate entities such as companies, partnerships, a Scottish Charitable Incorporate Organisation (SCIO), or other bodies corporate established by law (such as a government agency or local authority).

Organisations and associations must have the rights capacity to own property in their own right, in order to act as a transferor (the person transferring ownership) or transferee (the person receiving ownership) in a voluntary transfer of land. It is necessary to check their respective articles of association, constitutions, or founding legislation in order to ascertain whether the transferor or transferee has rights capacity in order to legally own land in Scotland.

If the transferee in a voluntary transfer is an unincorporated association, of which there is no definition in Scots law but is generally interpreted as "a group of persons bound together by agreement for a particular purpose". Without being a corporate body, the association has no legal-person status in Scots law; and, as such, when unincorporated associations transact to obtain ownership of the land, all the members of the association instead will own the property jointly in trust rather than ownership of the land vesting in solely in the association itself.

== The General Register of Sasines ==
The General Register of Sasines (GRS), as discussed above, is a deeds-based register of land transactions in Scotland. It was established following the Registration Act 1617 and is held in Edinburgh at the Registers of Scotland's offices at Meadowbank House. In theory, it is available for public viewing, but the record system is complex, so enquirers will often require the assistance of staff or private-title researchers to identify the relevant deed, upon payment of fees.

=== Indexing system ===
The GRS is indexed by the names of the parties and the property itself. Each property is given a search sheet which lists all the recorded deeds for that property. If there is a subdivision of the property, a new search sheet is given to that subdivision, and a 'break off' note is made on the original property's search sheet. Each party's names recorded on the deed will also be indexed, so the deed is also identifiable by names alone. Deeds are stored in the 33 county divisions of Scotland (see above).

Plans

There was no requirement that a plan had to be included with the recorded deed to identify the property transferred, or the extent of other real rights. Instead narration of the boundaries in the deed was sufficient for recording.

=== Closure of the Sasine Register ===
The GRS is projected to close by 2024, with all recorded land moved to the Land Register. However, without further reforms the closure of the GRS is unlikely by 2024, given the large amount of long-owned lands still recorded in the GRS. This includes land such as large estates that have remained in the same family for generations, land owned by local authorities historically owned by other local government bodies such as burghs or town councils (this is commonly the case with parks managed by local authorities)m and land owned by the Forestry and Land Scotland and other public bodies, etc. The 2012 Act has gone further to initiate this transfer, such as the introduction of Keeper-induced registration. However it remains to be seen whether the Sasine Register will closed by 2024.

==== Moving to the Land Register ====
===== First registration =====
Under s.48 of the Land Registration (Scotland) Act 2012, any new disposition transferring ownership must now be recorded in the Land Register. From 1 April 2016, creation of a standard security will also trigger transfer onto the Land Register. Further regulations by Scottish Ministers will prescribe other deeds that will trigger movement onto the Land Register.

Some deeds are still recordable in the General Register of Sasines, including:

- discharges of standard securities
- improvement grants
- guardianship orders

===== Voluntary registration =====
An owner of land whose deeds are recorded in the General Register of Sasines can request the Keeper of the Registers of Scotland to move their title to the Land Register without any new disposition or other deed to be registered. Guidance through the process and what is required as evidence is available on the Registers of Scotland website.

===== Keeper Induced Registration =====
The Keeper has the powers to force a property to be registered with the Land Register by virtue of powers under s.29 of the Land Registration (Scotland) Act 2012. This applies "irrespective of whether the proprietor or any other person consents". Guidance through the process is available on the Registers of Scotland website.

==== Duties of the Keeper ====
In accepting a "first registration", "voluntary registration", or a "Keeper-induced registration", the Keeper must:

1. make up a title sheet for the plot;
2. make such other changes to the title sheet record as are necessary or expedient;
3. create a cadastral unit for the plot;
4. make such other changes to the cadastral map as are necessary or expedient;
5. and copy into the archive record any document that
  1. has been submitted to the Keeper or is reasonably available to the Keeper,
  2. and is relevant to the accuracy of the register.

== The Land Register of Scotland ==
Registers of Scotland Scottish Gaelic: Clàran na h-Alba
Non-ministerial government department overview
- Formed: 1617
- Jurisdiction: Scotland
- Headquarters: Meadowbank House, 153 London Road, Edinburgh EH8 7AU
- Employees: 884
- Minister responsible: Kate Forbes, Cabinet Secretary for Finance
- Non-ministerial government department executive: Jennifer Henderson, Keeper of the Registers of Scotland
- Website: www.ros.gov.uk

The Land Register of Scotland is held in Edinburgh at the Registers of Scotland's offices at Meadowbank House, alongside the other public registers, rather than decentralised and stored in local government registers in Scotland. It is available for public viewing online, and Title Sheets for land can be obtained via e-mail upon payment of a modest fee. In 2016, a Registers of Scotland report found that 60% of titles are in the Land Register, which is 1.6 million titles, for 29% of the land mass of Scotland. Therefore, 40% of titles remain to be transferred from the General Register of Sasines, which equates to 1.1 million titles. The Keeper projects the new register to be 100% complete by 2024, due to the closure of the Sasine Register in a process known as the Completion of the Land Register. However, academics are sceptical that a complete closure of the General Register of Sasines can be achieved by 2024, with Gretton and Reid noting that Completion could take "centuries".

=== The parts of the Land Register ===
The Land Register is divided into four parts:

==== (1) The Cadastral Map ====
A 'cadastre' or cadastral map is a topographic map of Scotland with the title boundaries of all properties registered in the Land Register. It can be seen as an "electronic megaplan for the whole of Scotland". The Cadastral Map operates on the Ordnance Survey map of Scotland, which is termed the base map. As the General Register of Sasines is emptied of entries, the cadastral map will become a full map of Scotland, covering all its land area. The cadastral map can be viewed online.

==== (2) The Title Sheet Record ====
The Title Sheet Record is the totality of all the title sheets in the Land Register. Each registered plot of land is given a title sheet. Separate title sheets are also created for legal and conventional tenements. The Keeper may create a separate title sheet for a long-lease, or add it to Section B of an existing Title Sheet instead. A title sheet identifies the property and lists all individuals with real rights in the property and other important statutory notices concerning the property itself.

===== Title sheets =====
Each title sheet has a reference number based on the county (termed '-shire', e.g. Inverness-shire) the land is based within. These are:

ABN	Aberdeen
ANG	Angus
ARG	Argyll
AYR	Ayr
BNF	Banff
BER	Berwick
BUT	Bute
CTH	Caithness
CLK	Clackmannan
DMB	Dumbarton
DMF	Dumfries
ELN	East Lothian
FFE	Fife
GLA	The Barony and Regality of Glasgow
INV	Inverness
KNC	Kincardine
KNR	Kinross
KRK	Kirkcudbright
LAN	Lanark
MID	Midlothian
MOR	Moray
NRN	Nairn
OAZ	Orkney and Zetland
PBL	Peebles
PTH	Perth
REN	Renfrew
ROS	Ross and Cromarty
ROX	Roxburgh
SEA	Seabed
SEL	Selkirk
STG	Stirling
STH	Sutherland
WLN	West Lothian
WGN	Wigtown

Therefore, the first three letters of the reference number indicate the location of the land in Scotland.

A title sheet has four sections:

====== Section A: Property ======
Section A defines the property contained in the title. If the title is benefitted by pertinents, such as servitudes or burdens enforceable against neighbouring properties, these will be listed here too. Long Leases and tenements (both conventional and legally separate) are also given their own Title Sheet.

====== Section B: Proprietorship ======
Section B lists the owners, termed proprietors, of the title. If there is only one owner, it will only list one name. If the property is owned in common, it will list the common owners and each owner's share of the property. Where the owner is a trustee and this is made known to the Keeper, it will narrate the ownership as one of a trustee. If there are special destinations (a clause in a disposition providing for ownership to transfer to a named individual on death, typically between husband and wife) in the disposition will also be noted in Section B. However land may still be held in trust if its existence was unknown to the Keeper at the time of registration.

====== Section C: Securities ======
Section C lists the standard securities, such as secured bank loans termed mortgages in other jurisdictions, held in the title.

====== Section D: Burdens ======
Section D lists any encumberances on the property, these are (1) burdens, (2) securities, or (3) long-leases affecting the property. It may also include public access rights. Other statutes may expressly provide for registration of other rights or notices and are placed here also.

==== (3) The Archive Record ====
The Archive Record is, as the name suggests, an archive with all copies of documentation received to the Keeper. It also contains the archives for all title sheets, so any past versions of the title sheet are kept, irrespective of the current state of the title sheet found in the Title Sheet Record.

==== (4) The Application Record ====
The Application Record, is as the name suggests, a record of all received, and pending, applications for registration and any current advance notices.

== Registration requirement for real rights in land ==
As has been discussed above (see "Publicity Principle"), the publicity principle requires that dispositions be transferred, forming the third stage of the voluntary transfer of property. Under the Land Registration (Scotland) Act 2012, only a registrable deed is capable of registration in the Land Register of Scotland. A deed is a legal document concerning the creation, transfer, variation, or extinction of real rights (or rights in rem). In Scots law, these commonly include, but are not limited to:

- Dispositions
- Standard securities
- Discharges of standard securities
- Long leases
- Deed of Servitude
- Deed of Burden
- Deed of Liferent

However, not all deeds can be registered into the Title Sheet of the Land Register, as will be discussed. Only registrable deeds can be so.

=== Registrable deeds ===
(1) A deed is registrable only if and in so far as its registration is authorised (whether expressly or not) by—

(a) this Act,

(b) an enactment mentioned in subsection (3), or

(c) any other enactment.

(3) The enactments referred to in subsections (1) and (2) are—

(a) the Registration of Leases (Scotland) Act 1857 (c.26),

(b) the Conveyancing (Scotland) Act 1924 (c.27),

(c) the Conveyancing and Feudal Reform (Scotland) Act 1970 (c.35),

(d) the Law Reform (Miscellaneous Provisions) (Scotland) Act 1985 (c.73).

(4) Registration of an invalid deed confers real effect only to the extent that an enactment so provides. — Land Registration (Scotland) Act 2012 s.49
[bold added]

Therefore, a registrable deed is one which is required for registration under the 2012 Act, the specified list in s.49(1(b)) of the 2012 Act, or any other law that allows registration of that deed. A common example of a deed not capable of registration is a lease of less than 20 years (i.e. a short lease), as only leases are capable of registration by one enactment alone: the Registration of Leases (Scotland) Act 1857, which limits registration to leases of more than 20 years. If no legislation provides for the registration of the deed then it is not classed as a registrable deed.

=== Registration process ===
One can apply for registration of registrable deeds by sending an application to the Keeper.

==== (A) Conditions for registration ====
The first stage to consider is whether the deed meet the conditions for registration of it in the Land Register. The Land Registration (Scotland) Act 2012 provides certain conditions must be met for the deed to be registrable. These are:

Land Registration (Scotland) Act 2012 Section 21

(2)The Keeper must accept an application... to the extent the applicant satisfies the Keeper that, as at the date of application, the general application conditions are met and—

(a)where the application is made in respect of a disposition of, or a notice of title to, an unregistered plot, the conditions set out in section 23 are met,

(b)where section 25 applies, the conditions set out in that section are met,

(c)in any other case, the conditions set out in section 26 are met.[bold added]

Therefore the general conditions must always be met, and where:

- the application is for a disposition or a notice of title to an unregistered plot [i.e. a first registration, for land which has not been previously registered in the Land Register, such as land still recorded in the Register of Sasines], the conditions of Section 23 of the 2012 Act must be met.
- the application is for certain deeds relating to unregistered plots, the conditions of Section 25 of the 2012 Act must be met.
- the application is for neither (2) or (3), i.e. registered land, the conditions in Section 26 of the 2012 must be met.

===== (1) General conditions for acceptance =====
The general conditions apply to all applications for registration.

Land Registration (Scotland) Act 2012 Section 22

(1) The general application conditions are—

(a) the application is such that the Keeper is able to comply, in respect of it, with such duties as the Keeper has under Part 1,

(b) the application does not relate to a souvenir plot,

(c) the application does not fall to be rejected by virtue of section 6 or 9G of the Requirements of Writing (Scotland) Act 1995 (c.7) (registration of document) or of a prohibition in an enactment,

(d) the application is in the form (if any) prescribed by land register rules, and

(e) either—

(i) such fee as is payable for registration is paid, or

(ii) arrangements satisfactory to the Keeper are made for payment of that fee.

(2) In subsection (1)(b), souvenir plot means a plot of land which—

(a) is of inconsiderable size and of no practical utility, and

(b) is neither—

(i) a registered plot, nor

(ii) a plot the ownership of which has, at any time, separately been constituted or transferred by a document recorded in the Register of Sasines.[bold and brackets added]

Therefore, to satisfy the general conditions, the application must comply with:

====== (i) The duties of the Keeper ======
The Keeper has legal duties under Part 1 of the 2012 Act. These are the duties to complete Section B, C, and D of the land's Title Sheet (see above) and the duty to place a copy of the registered deed in the Archive Record. If the application cannot assist the Keeper in completing these duties, e.g. omitting a copy of the deed in the application, a defect in the disposition itself meaning Sections B, C or D cannot be fully completed, etc., then it must be rejected.

====== (ii) No souvenir plots ======
Souvenir plots are a sales practice in which sellers advertise (usually online) that the buyer will obtain ownership of a small tract of land in an estate in Scotland, with the seller falsely advertising that they have the right to style themselves as "Laird" or "Lady" in Scots law. However, souvenir plots are banned for registration in the Land Register, in effect preventing any buyer from obtaining a real right of ownership in Scotland. Additionally, titles of peerage are only available by letters patent from the sovereign; and Scots heraldry (coats of arms and related insignia) are only available by grant of the Court of the Lord Lyon. So, the buyer obtains no legal rights to titles or the use of heraldry in the purchase of the plot.

====== (iii) No formal invalidity under the Requirements of Writing (Scotland) Act (1995) or any other legal prohibition. ======
The deed registered must be formally valid under the Requirements of Writing (Scotland) Act 1995.

====== (iv) The application is in the form prescribed ======
The applicant must use the correct form prescribed by the Keeper. The prescribed application form is available on the Registers of Scotland website.

===== (2) Conditions for registration of a disposition of, or a notice of title to, an unregistered plot =====
Where the property is being registered as a first registration [i.e. the land is still recorded in the General Register of Sasines] the following conditions must be met:

Land Registration Scotland Act 2012 Section 23

Conditions of registration: transfer of unregistered plot

(1) The conditions are that—

(a) the application is made by the grantee of the disposition [i.e. the person receiving the property] or as the case may be the person in whose favour is the notice of title [i.e. a liquidator, trustee-in-bankruptcy, executor etc. assuming ownership]

(b) the deed is valid,[i.e. it is formally valid under the Requirements of Writing (Scotland) Act 1995]

(c) the deed so describes the plot as to enable the Keeper to delineate its boundaries on the cadastral map,

(d) where within the plot there is a lesser area in respect of which a registrable encumbrance [i.e. a burden, a security, public right of way, etc.] is constituted there is included in, or submitted with, the application a plan or description sufficient to enable the Keeper to delineate the boundaries of the lesser area on the cadastral map,

(e) there is included in the application a description of every public right of way (by whatever means) over or through the plot in so far as known to the applicant.[bold and brackets added]

===== (3) Conditions for certain deeds relating to unregistered plots =====
For certain deeds for unregistered land [i.e. the land is still recorded in the General Register of Sasines] additional requirements exist under section 25. The certain deeds of unregistered land that fall under this section are:

- a lease of an unregistered plot of land.
- an assignation of an unregistered lease.
- an sublease granted by a tenant.
- a deed creating a standard security in the unregistered land.
- (from 2016) any other deeds relating to a standard security
- A notice of title recordable under the Conveyancing (Scotland) Act 1924
- Any other deeds the Scottish Ministers may prescribe by secondary legislation. As discussed above, the Registers of Scotland aim to close the General Register of Sasines by 2024. Therefore, it is anticipated that the certain deeds definition will be widened by the Scottish Ministers in order to widen the scope of 'triggers' by which a new registration is required in an effort to Complete the Land Register.

The conditions that apply to the above deeds under Section 25 of the 2012 Act are similar to the (2) requirements for registration of a disposition of, or a notice of title to, an unregistered plot (see above).

===== (4) Conditions for all other cases, i.e. deeds relating to registered land =====
Example deeds are available to view on the Property Standardisation Group website. The conditions that apply for deeds of registered land are:

Land Registration Scotland Act 2012 Section 23

The conditions are that—

(a) the deed is valid,

(b) the deed relates to a registered plot of land,

(c) the deed narrates the title number of each title sheet to which the application relates, and

(d) the deed, in so far as it relates to part only of a plot of land or of the subjects of a lease, so describes the part as to enable the Keeper to delineate on the cadastral map the boundaries of the part.

=== (B) Decision-making by the Keeper ===
The applicant must send the application form and a copy of the deed to the Keeper, usually by post or online, so that the Keeper can review whether the deed meets the conditions for registration. An electronic copy of the deed is sufficient for registration. The Keeper publishes guidance, in relation to this assessment process, which is available to view online.

The Keeper must acknowledge receipt of an application in a prescribed manner. The Keeper must deal with the application without unreasonable delay. The Scottish Ministers may establish deadlines for applications to be accepted or rejected by secondary legislation in the Land Register Rules. The Keeper operates a 'one shot rule' in which if any errors exist in the application or deed, the Keeper will reject the application.

If the Keeper rejects the application, the following people must be inform:

- the applicant;
- the granter of the deed (i.e. the owner of the property);
- any other person the Keeper considers appropriate.

If the applicant withdraws the application, the Keeper must inform the granter and any other person the Keeper considers appropriate.

=== (C) Acceptance of a registrable deed ===
Where the Keeper is satisfied the relevant conditions are met, the application must be accepted. The Keeper must then update the Title Sheet of the property to reflect the accepted registrable deed. Applications are dealt with based on date of application. The date of registration in the Title Sheet will be backdated to the date of application. The Keeper must inform the applicant, the granter of the deed, and any other person considered appropriate.

== Legal effects of acceptance ==
=== The 1979 act and the 'Midas touch' ===
Under the Land Registration (Scotland) Act 1979, registration of the deed in the Land Register gave the deed a 'Midas touch', which is named after the mythological Greek king Midas who was said to have the power to turn anything he touched into gold. In practice, the Keeper's 'Midas touch' meant that any registration 'turned' the deed valid and granted the real rights in the property to the individual named in the deed, irrespective of the validity of the underlying deed. The Land Registration (Scotland) Act 1979 provided:

...registration shall have the effect of vesting in the person registered as entitled to the registered interest in land a real right in and to the interest... — Land Registration (Scotland) Act 1979 section 8

This was a source of considerable difficulty in conveyancing practice. The interpretation of the provision meant that individuals who had no legal right could obtain a real right in the land, irrespective of the validity of the causa. The examples below illustrate the working of the 'Midas touch':

==== Example one: Fraud ====
A pretends be the rightful owner, C, of land called Pixie Place in Fife. He advertises the land for sale locally and a Buyer, B, enters into Missives of Sale to purchase Pixie Place. B pays the purchase price upon the date of entry and obtains a forged disposition from A, who has signed it, impersonating C. B's solicitors send the disposition to the Land Register of Scotland and the Keeper, believing it to be valid, enters it into the Land Register of Scotland and updates the Title Sheet to name B as owner of the land.

A few days later, B drives to the house to move in, opens the door and meets C, the true owner of the property, sitting in the living room. B and C try to find A, the fraudster, but he has vanished beyond trace. Yet, who is it who now owns Pixie Place and is entitled to live there under the 1979 Act? B. This is because the Keeper's 'Midas touch' has turned his deed valid and vested him with the real right of ownership, and has terminated C's real right of ownership.

==== Example two: Neighbouring properties ====
F and G live as neighbours on separate farms in Clackmannanshire. Their farms have been owned by F and G's family for generations, so each land has not yet been registered in the Land Register of Scotland. At the rear of their properties are woodlands that belong to G as part of his title recorded in the General Register of Sasines. However, as there has never been any dispute over the ownership of the woodlands, F believes these woodlands to be part of his land.

F, after a failed harvest, decides to give up the farming life and move to Stirling with his family, so he puts the farm up for sale and receives an offer from a buyer, H. H pays the purchase price and receives a valid disposition from F for the farm and its land, including the woodland as F believes it to be his to sell. As the property is registered in the General Register of Sasines, the farm and its lands must be added to the Land Register as a first registration. The Keeper, following the narration of the disposition (which includes the woodlands within the boundaries of the title) creates a Title Sheet for the property and delineates the property's boundaries on the cadastral map. Importantly, the woodlands are included in the Title Sheet and H is listed as owner. In the meantime, H moves onto the farm and commences farming.

G, after a failed harvest, decides to diversify the farming and wishes to construct an adventure course in the woodlands in order to attract visitors to the farm as an alternative method of raising income. G wants to fund this construction project by obtaining a secured loan from the bank, in return for the bank obtaining a standard security (i.e. a mortgage) in the farm. The bank agrees to the loan and G signs the deeds creating a standard security in the farm. This standard security must now be registered in the Land Register, as its recording in the General Register of Sasines is no longer competent. The Keeper draws up the Title Sheet for the property, enters the standard security into the Title Sheet and sends a copy to G. When the copy arrives in the post at G's farm, G is shocked to discover that the Keeper has not included the woodlands in the title as this they are included in H's title.

Who now owned the woodlands under the 1979 Act? The Keeper's 'Midas touch' at the moment of registration of H's disposition, has turned H's ownership of the woodlands valid and the legal owner of the woodlands.

The perceived unfairness of the operation of the Keeper's 'Midas touch', among other criticisms of the 1979 act, led to the recommendation for its abolition by the Scottish Law Commission. The subsequent act, the Land Registration (Scotland) Act 2012 repealed the 'Midas touch' provisions and provided that:

...registration of an invalid deed confers only real effect to the extent that an enactment so provides... — Land Registration (Scotland) Act 2012 section 49(4)

=== Removal of Midas Touch for Properties Registered Under the 1979 Act ===
The Keeper's 'Midas touch' was removed for registrations under the Land Registration (Scotland) Act 2012. In its place, the 2012 Act provides for the legal effects of acceptance for certain deeds and references other enactments concerning real rights (or rights in rem).

=== 2012 act ===
The legal effect of the registration of the deed in the Title Sheet of the property in the Land Register is governed by the respective law for each type of deed. However, the 2012 act provides for the effects of the common following deeds:

==== Disposition ====
Only registration of the disposition is capable of transferring ownership of property registered in the Land Register. As discussed above, ownership transfers instantaneously the moment the Keeper registers the disposition, thereby changing the Section B individual listed as Proprietor.

==== Deed of liferent ====
Registration of the deed creating the liferent in the property vests the grantee with a real right of liferent.

==== Leases ====
If the lease of the property is registrable under the Registration of Leases (Scotland) Act 1857 (i.e. it is longer than 20 years), the following deeds are capable of registration:

- A deed creating the lease of a duration.
- A deed terminating the lease.
- A deed extending the duration of the lease.
- A deed otherwise altering the terms of the lease.

Registration of these deeds will respectively create or alter the real right of lease in the property.

==== Notice of Completion of Title ====
Any person having right either to land or to a heritable security may complete title by registration in the Land Register, the effect of registration of a notice conform to the Conveyancing (Scotland) Act 1924 gives the individual named in the notice a real right of ownership.

==== Registration of decree of reduction ====
If a litigant is awarded a decree of reduction of title in their favour, registration of the decree will give legal effect under the Conveyancing (Scotland) Act 1924.

==== Registration of order for rectification of document etc. ====
Under the Law Reform (Miscellaneous Provisions) (Scotland) Act 1985, an order for rectification of a defectively expressed contract that is registered in the Land Register (such as a lease or deed or servitude) will only affect any property rights upon its registration in the Land Register.

==== Deed of burden ====
Registration of a deed creating a real burden in both properties of the burden (i.e. the benefitted property and the burdened property) will create the burden itself over the property.

==== Deed of servitude ====
A deed of servitude must be registered in both properties (i.e. the benefitted property/properties and the burdened property/properties) in order to create the positive servitude.

==== Standard security ====
The standard securities registration in the Title Sheet of the Land Register creates a real right of security in the property held by the creditor.

== Prescriptive claims: A Non Domino dispositions ==
Under the operation of positive prescription, a possessor of land is capable of acquiring real right of ownership following possession of land for the required prescriptive period, which is currently 10 consecutive years. The rules for positive prescription are found in the Prescription and Limitation (Scotland) Act 1973. However, in order to initiate the prescriptive process, a possessor is required to found possession based on registration of an ex facie deed, also termed a foundation writ. This means a deed which appears to be valid ex facie (i.e. on the face of it) but is otherwise invalid can give a possessor the right of ownership, irrespective of the consent of the true owner of the property, after the passage of the prescriptive period. As a result, only registration of a disposition is capable of being an ex facie deed transferring ownership.

These special dispositions, which appear valid ex facie but are otherwise invalid, are called a non domino (i.e. from a non-owner) dispositions and the registration process of the a non domino disposition is known under the Land Registration (Scotland) Act 2012 as a prescriptive claim, and the applicant is known as a prescriptive claimant. Registers of Scotland produces guidance, available online, for prescriptive claimants.

=== Validity of deed ===
As discussed above, because a deed must appear on the face of it to be valid, the deed must be a disposition, known as an a non domino disposition. There must also be a purported transfer within the deed, a prescriptive claimant cannot grant ownership to themselves, as there would be no transfer involved. This follows the rule established by The Board of Management of Aberdeen College v Stewart Watt Youngson and another. In this case, the defenders, Youngson and others, had granted an a non domino disposition which named themselves as granters and grantees and had it recorded in the General Register of Sasines in order to commence the prescriptive period for positive possession. However, Lord Menzies, in the Outer House, found that this was not an ex facie deed because it was not valid to transfer ownership to and from the same persons. Lord Menzies also cited with approval the statement in Gretton, GL, and Reid, KGC, Conveyancing, at paras 7.25, that "a disposition a non domino must not reveal that the disponer is not the owner, or it will lose its potential status as a foundation writ."

=== A non domino disposition ===
The Latin term a non domino can be translated literally to mean "from a non-owner". It is used in property law to describe a disposition that the Keeper is aware of being wholly or partially invalid on the basis of the grantee having no legal right to give title, thereby failing the normal conditions for registration (see above), but can be registered regardless. This is an exception to the general principle of nemo dat quod non habet, ("no one can give what one does not have"). Accordingly, the warrandice (or guarantees) given by the granter in such dispositions is simple warrandice alone. The Scottish academics Gretton and Reid describe the straightforward requirements:

What happens is that the [claimant] gets a friend to grant a gratuitous disposition of the land, and the disposition is registered in the Land Register.

Therefore, it is possible for ownership of land to be obtained without the consent of the true owner, or any person capable of becoming owner, by way of positive prescription. However, because of lower requirements, it is common for prescriptive claims to be an attempt to obtain land by stealth. An example of this can be seen in one prescriptive claim made where the current owner of the property was still living on the land and was unaware that the prescriptive claimant was trying to obtain ownership without his consent. Dating back to the 1990s, the rules regulating a non domino registrations – now found in the Land Registration (Scotland) Act 2012 – have become increasingly demanding, reflecting the risks of attempts to obtain land by stealth. Successful applications are few, with only 17 prescriptive claims successfully placed into the Land Register during the first three years of the 2012 Act's operation. However, an a non domino disposition remains a valid means of lawfully obtaining ownership of land.

=== Pre-application requirements ===
==== Pre-requisite possession ====
Before an application for an a non domino disposition (known as a prescriptive claim) can be made under the Land Registration (Scotland) Act 2012, the land in question must already have been possessed for a continuous period of one year by either the prescriptive claimant alone or by the prescriptive claimant and the disposition granter (the disponer) together.

==== Notification requirements ====
At least 60 days prior to the prescriptive claim being made by way of application to the Keeper, the prescriptive claimant must notify certain individuals. These are:

1. the owner of the land, or
2. if no owner exists or none can be identified, any person who appears capable of taking steps to become owner, or
3. failing both (a) and (b), the Crown.

The onus lies with the applicant to satisfy the Keeper that (1) the correct person has been identified (or that all reasonable steps have been taken to identify the correct person), and (2) that the notification has in fact been carried out and that it is sufficient in its terms. The applicant must then send a special notice – a Form of Notification, available online from the Registers of Scotland's website – to that person's last known address, by recorded delivery, such that its posting can be demonstrated to the Keeper.

===== Notification to the owner =====
Where land has been registered in the Land Register, its owner can be easily identified by reference to Section B of its Title Sheet. Otherwise, the applicant must search the Register of Sasines for the last recorded disposition. Once the owner has been identified, a form of notification must be sent by recorded delivery. The applicant must provide copies of the results of the search, including the Search Sheet and any copy of deeds recorded, if they can be found.

Importantly, the Keeper must see proof that the owner still exists. In the case of an individual, this will mean evidence that the person is still alive. Such evidence can include:

- The results from a search of the electoral roll, accessible by contacting the local authority. Copies are also available at local libraries and other council buildings. Evidence of searches of other local authority registers can also be submitted.
- Evidence of contact with local solicitors (the last solicitor to act for the owner may be able to confirm that they are still alive).
- Local newspaper advertisements appealing for the owner to come forward.

In the case of a company, an online search of the company's house records, to show that the company is still registered as active, may be sufficient. If the company is listed as dissolved, then the land falls to the Crown as bona vacantia, and so the King's and Lord Treasurer's Remembrancer (KLTR) must be contacted.

===== Notification to a person able to complete title =====
Where the owner cannot be identified, the applicant must instead notify any persons able to complete title to the property. This includes those individuals who have a right to take ownership, such as an heir to a deceased person's estate. This will not normally apply in relation to land previously owned by a company, which cannot have "successors" as such.

The applicant must first prove to the Keeper that it was not possible to notify the owner. Evidence might include:

- Evidence of failed searches of public registers.
- Evidence that the proprietor is no longer alive, such as a death certificate.
- A copy of any court order where an individual with an interest has obtained a declarator under the Presumption of Death (Scotland) Act 1977 that the individual is dead.

Evidence must then be shown that the alternative person identified is capable of completing title.

- Where the person is a beneficiary of the deceased's estate, holding a confirmation with docket transferring title to them (but having never actually completed title), the confirmation and docket will constitute sufficient evidence.
- Where the owner died having left a will clearly conveying title to a beneficiary, that person may be able to rely on it to complete title. In such a case the will, along with a death certificate and some confirmation that the testamentary document represents the former owner's final intentions, may be sufficient.
- Where the owner died without leaving a will, any person who might have inherited the land under the Scots rules of intestate succession may be shown suitable on the basis of genealogical research. Professional agencies can be enlisted to this end for a fee. There is no cut-off period in Scots law for relatives to claim inheritance from an intestate estate, allowing for laughing heirs, so a person capable of becoming owner is nearly always identifiable. The KLTR lists all estates remaining unclaimed in case a relative should come forward.

===== Notification to the Crown =====
If an exhaustive search for the owner or any person capable of taking steps to become owner should prove fruitless, the land may be taken to have fallen to the Crown as being otherwise ownerless it is bona vacantia or ultimus haeres. The applicant must in this case send the Form of Notification by recorded delivery to the Crown's representative, the King's and Lord Treasurer's Remembrancer (KLTR), which produces policy guidance on how prescriptive claims are dealt with.

=== Application requirements ===
Before an a non domino disposition will be considered by the Keeper as valid for registration, two conditions must be met:

1. The disposition must be invalid only in the sense that the granter had no valid title to give. In every other respect, it must be valid and properly drafted.
2. Certain persons must have been notified of the application (see above).

As with all applications, the Keeper operates a "one-shot" policy. This is to say that any errors or discrepancies, however minor, will result in rejection at a cost to the applicant.

==== The Keeper's notification requirements ====
Upon receiving an application, the Keeper must also notify the appropriate person as identified by the applicant (see above). The Keeper will only do so once satisfied that the correct person has been identified by the applicant, and indeed will only notify any individual so identified: where it is thought that a different person should have been notified, the application will be rejected or delayed pending further evidence. The Keeper will only contact the person where to do so would be reasonably practicable, though in practice the Keeper will rarely decline to do so given that any objection is fatal to the application. Notification is typically by post, though notification by the Keeper need not be by recorded delivery and can indeed be by any means the Keeper considers appropriate.

===== Objection by appropriate person =====
The notified person may object to the application in writing within 60 days of the Keeper having issued notice. Objection requires no explanation, and results in an automatic rejection of the application.

=== Effect of registration of prescriptive claim ===
Where the Keeper is entirely satisfied that the requirements of the 2012 Act have been met, and no objection has been tendered, the applicant's name will be provisionally entered in the Land Register. Where an application relates only to part of a registered title, the Keeper will also mark the extent of the provisional entry on the Title Plan. A separate title sheet is not created.

Following registration, the successful applicant is not yet the legal owner of the land – only at the end of the ten-year prescriptive period does this become the case. However, registration itself allows the commencement of this prescriptive period. If the legal owner is known, this information remains included in the title sheet; the entry of the applicant's name does not affect anyone else's rights in the land. The true owner (or indeed those capable of becoming the true owner, or the Crown) may assert their right of ownership at any time during the prescriptive period by an action of vindictatio (vindication).

Ordinarily, and discussed below, where a title sheet is registered the Keeper will warrant the title (i.e. guarantee it), meaning that compensation may be payable where it later requires to be rectified. In the case of a prescriptive claim registration, however, no such warranty is given.

After the conclusion of the prescriptive period, currently 10 years, the Keeper will remove the provisional entry from the property's Title Sheet and enter it as a full entry, thereby allowing the prescriptive claimant the real right of ownership. The Keeper may also choose to grant warrant to the claimant upon doing so.

== Keeper's Indemnity ==
The Keeper's Indemnity was the form of state guarantee of title under the Land Registration (Scotland) Act 1979. However, the Land Registration (Scotland) Act 2012 has now repealed the 1979 Act and the Keeper's Indemnity, but transitional provisions were provided for land with claims of the Keeper's Indemnity outstanding on the designated day (namely, 8 December 2014). Any claim after this date is now covered by the Keeper's Warranty (see below) under the 2012 Act.

=== Operation of the Keeper's Indemnity ===
The Keeper's Indemnity was wider than the Keeper's Warranty, as the indemnity was available to any individual suffering loss due to an error in the Land Register. In contrast, the warranty protects only specific people, primarily applicants, for registration of a deed.

Under the Land Registration (Scotland) Act 1979 a person who suffered loss was entitled to indemnity in three situations. The three situations were:

1. loss caused by rectification of the land register or refusal or omission to rectify it;
2. loss caused by destruction of a document lodged with the Keeper;
3. loss caused by an error or omission in any land or charge certificate or written information given by the Keeper, including professional services such as search reports.

== The Keeper's Warranty ==
When the Keeper accepts an application for registration of a deed, the Keeper, by default, warrants to the applicant:

1. That the Title Sheet is accurate in so far as it shows acquisition, variation, or discharge in favour of the applicant.
2. That the Title Sheet is not inaccurate by way of an omission of an encumberance permitted or required by statute.

These warranties allow an applicant to claim compensation from the Keeper in the event that the Title Sheet is inaccurate at the time of registration. The Keeper's Warranty does not apply to voidable titles, as the owner of the voidable title has a subsistent title. The Keeper's Warranty acts as a state guarantee of title.

=== Statutory exclusions from warranty ===
Section 73 of the 2012 Act excludes the following Title Sheet inaccuracies by default:

- The land is not unencumbered by any public right of way. Public Rights of Way can exist without registration, so the Keeper cannot warrant this.
- Similar to the common law public right of way, if a path constituted under section 22 of the Land Reform (Scotland) Act 2003 exists, the Keeper's warranty does not extend to cover this unregistered encumbrance.
- If the land is encumbered by a servitude created other than by registration in accordance with section 75(1) of the Title Conditions (Scotland) Act 2003, the Keeper's warranty does not extend to cover this. This is because servitudes can be created by positive prescription, so those servitudes will not appear in the title sheet but still are validly created without the Keeper being aware.
- A right appearing on the Title Sheet as a pertinent that is not of a kind capable of being a valid pertinent under Scots law is not covered by the Keeper's warranty.
- The Keeper will not warrant that the applicant has by registration acquired a right to mines or minerals,
- The Keeper will not warrant that a registered lease has not been varied or terminated without the variation or termination having been registered,
- If the Title Sheet shows an acquisition, variation, or discharge more extensive than the deed registered bore to effect, the Keeper will not warrant that this over-statement is accurate.
- The Keeper will not warrant that no alluvion has taken place on the land, alluvio is a Roman law concept of original acquisition of land whereby a river has deposited or removed sediment (alluvium) from the land.

=== Keeper's discretion to extend, exclude, or limit the Keeper's warranty ===
As well as the statutory exclusions of the Keeper's warranty, the Keeper also has the power to extend, limit, or exclude warranty beyond the statutory defaults under the 2012 Act when accepting a registration.

=== Compensation ===
The Keeper must pay compensation for any loss incurred as a result of breach of the Keeper's warranty. However, compensation is only payable where the inaccuracy has been rectified (see above) by the Keeper. If the claimant accepts the compensation, the claimant assigns his rights to sue any other individual who has caused him loss in respect of the inaccuracy (e.g. the previous Owner and Seller of the property, etc.) to the Keeper. This means the Keeper can 'step into the claimant's shoes' and be indemnified from the other individuals for the compensation made to the claimant .

=== Circumstances where compensation is not payable ===
Certain circumstances exclude the payment of compensation for breach of the Keeper's warranty. These include:

- If the inaccuracy is due to an error in the cadastral map and that error was made in reasonable reliance upon the base map.
- If the existence of the inaccuracy was, or ought to have been, known to (1) the applicant, or (2) any person acting as solicitor or other legal adviser to the applicant, at the time of registration. The applicant would still have recourse to sue his solicitor for professional negligence.
- In so far as the inaccuracy is attributable to a failure of the applicant, any person acting as solicitor, or other legal adviser to the applicant to comply with the duties owed to the Keeper under section 111 of the 2012 Act (see below).
- In so far as the claimant's loss could have been avoided by the applicant, owner, or claimant taking certain measures which it would have been reasonable for the applicant, owner, or claimant to take.
- In so far as the connection between the claimant's loss and the inaccuracy is too remote, or for non-patrimonial loss (i.e. losses without an economic value).

== Errors in the Land Register ==
It is not uncommon for errors to appear in the Land Register, the title sheet may be inaccurate where:

- the title sheet misstates what the position is in law or in fact,
- the title sheet omits anything required by statute to be included in it, or
- the title includes information not expressly or implicitly permitted by, or under, an enactment.

Where an inaccuracy is brought to the attention of the Keeper, the Keeper has a legal duty to rectify it where the inaccuracy is 'manifest' (i.e. obvious). In practice, the evidential requirements for a 'manifest' inaccuracy requires the issuance of an order for rectification or a declarator by the Scottish Courts, or Lands Tribunal for Scotland, in order to prove to the Keeper that there is a manifest error in the Land Register. If the inaccuracy is not manifest, the Keeper must still note the error in the title sheet or cadastral map so it can be identified in future.

=== Referral to the Lands Tribunal for Scotland ===
Any person with an interest may refer an inaccuracy or the measures needed for rectification to the Lands Tribunal for Scotland. Where an application is made for the Lands Tribunal to consider, the Lands Tribunal clerk must notify:

- the applicant,
- any other person appearing to them to have an interest,
- the Keeper.

This right of referral is not the only exclusive method to obtain rectification, a court action or declarator may be raised instead in the Sheriff Court or Court of Session. At any civil hearing, the Keeper has the right to appear and be heard.

=== Compensation ===
Where the Keeper makes a rectification, the Keeper must pay compensation to the claimant for any reasonable non-judicial legal expenses and any loss caused by the inaccuracy. If the claimant accepts the compensation, the claimant assigns the right to sue any other individual who has caused the claimant loss in respect of the inaccuracy (e.g. the previous owner and seller of the property, etc.) to the Keeper. This means the Keeper can 'step into the claimant's shoes' and be indemnified from the other individuals for the compensation made to the claimant.

== Advance Notices ==
The introduction of Advance Notices was recommended by the Scottish Law Commission's Report on Land Registration (2010, SLC Report No. 222) and introduced under the Land Registration (Scotland) Act 2012. Advance Notices are designed to address the gap risk, the risk that an unregistered grantee of a deed (the applicant) must run after the deed has been submitted to the Land Register for registration but registration has not yet been completed (i.e. the Keeper has not accepted the deed and entered it into the Title Sheet).

During the gap-risk period, the applicant has not legally obtained in the real right applied for. Delays in land registration are not uncommon, with a serious backlog of up to two years for some applications for registrations, arising as recently as 2018. During this gap-risk period, the applicant is at a risk of having their application for registration of the deed defeated by another successful application for registration, as was the case in Burnett's Trustees v Grainger (discussed above). Advance Notices were introduced to provide a protective period for an applicant to ensure that no other individual can register a deed while their application pends decision by the Keeper.

=== Letters of obligation ===
Prior to the introduction of Advance Notices, the gap risk was covered by a 'letter of obligation' by the granter's solicitors in favour of the grantee. This letter created a guarantee, binding the firm with a personal obligation (i.e. a contractual obligation) to indemnify the applicant if their application is defeated by another personal right (e.g. in an action for reduction). The Scottish Law Commission noted that letters of obligation appeared to be unique to Scots law, with no other legal system in the world requiring their legal professionals to create a personal obligation in favour of the grantee of land. However, letters of obligation were technically not a requirement under Scots property law, which allowed the gap risk due to the nature of the race to the registers (see above), but came into usage because the flaws in land registration law required solicitors to make such obligations in an effort to provide security to transacting parties. The Scottish Law Commission also noted that letters of obligation were deeply unpopular with the Scottish legal profession and had resulted in increased costs for clients because of the insurance premiums required to cover the law firm being passed on to the client. The Law Society of Scotland was also critical of letters of obligation. These complaints, along with other problems with land registration, were addressed by the Scottish Law Commission in its report, primarily the recommendation of the introduction of Advance Notices. The introduction of Advance Notices under the Land Registration (Scotland) Act 2012 led to letters of obligation falling into disuse.

=== Creation of Advance Notices ===
The granter of the deed, or another individual with the consent of the granter, can apply to the Keeper for an Advance Notice under the 2012 Act. A fee must be paid for such an application. Where the Keeper accepts the application, the Advance Notice must be entered into the Application Record of the Land Register, or where the land is still unregistered (see above), record the Advance Notice in the General Register of Sasines.

=== Protection of Advance Notices ===
An Advance Notice provides a 35-day protected period beginning the day after the Advance Notice is entered into the Land Register or General Register of Sasines. During this protected period, no disposition may be accepted except the disposition specified in the Advance Notices. The 2012 Act provides that:

Land Registration (Scotland) Act 2012 Section 59

(1) Subsections (2) and (3) apply in relation to any two deeds ("deed Y" and "deed Z") relating to the same plot of land where—

(a) during a protected period relating to deed Y—

(i) an application is made for registration of deed Z, and

(ii) on or after the date of that application, an application is made for registration of deed Y, and

(b) deed Z either—

(i) is not a deed in relation to which a protected period is running, or

(ii) is such a deed, but the protected period relating to deed Y began before the protected period relating to deed Z.

(2) If deed Z is registered before the Keeper comes to make any decision as to whether or not to accept the application for registration of deed Y, that decision is to be taken as if deed Z had not been registered.

(3) If the decision mentioned in subsection (2) is to accept the application—

(a) deed Y has on registration the same effect as if deed Z had not been registered, and

(b) the Keeper must amend the register so that it gives effect (if any) to deed Z as if it were registered after deed Y."

This section means that where another deed (Deed A), unrelated to the Advance Notice, is registered in the Title Sheet during the protective period of Deed B, Deed A is taken to be treated as if it never existed, allowing the deed to which the Advance Notice relates to be registered first. Examples below explain the operation of an Advance Notice's protection.

==== Example one: Dispositions, fraud and Advance Notices ====
Margaret owns a house in North Ballachulish. Margaret concludes Missives of Sale to sell her house to Innes, and Innes pays the purchase price to her. Innes then takes delivery of a validly executed disposition. Margaret's solicitor, as commonly agreed in the missives of sale, applies for an advance notice to be placed in the Land Register relating to the disposition given to Innes on 4 November 2020. The Keeper registers this on the same day. The protective period therefore commences on 5 November 2020. Innes's solicitor has other pressing matters to attend to, so she places the disposition in a drawer in her office.

Margaret, fiendishly minded, decides to sell her house again to fraudulently obtain the purchase price so she can leave Scotland permanently. She contracts with Thomas, a holiday-letting businessman living in Edinburgh, to sell her house again. Thomas does not wish to use solicitors, as he is keen to reduce costs in the sale, which Margaret readily agrees to (and she is secretly overjoyed to hear, as no solicitor will carry out due diligence on the property by searching the Land Register, etc.). Thomas obtains a valid disposition from Margaret and pays the purchase price. Thomas, sends this disposition for registration in the Land Register on 8 November 2020. The Keeper receives this on 9 November 2020 and registers the disposition the same day.

Innes's solicitor finally opens her drawer and sends the disposition to the Keeper for registration, it arrives at the Keeper in Edinburgh on 16 November 2020. Without the advance notice, Innes's disposition would be rejected by the Keeper, as Thomas is now owner; so Margaret's conveyance within Thomas's disposition is invalid. This is because of the nature of the race to the registers.

However, with the advance notice in place, the Keeper treats Thomas's disposition as if it never exists, removes the entry and enters Innes's disposition into the Title Sheet. Innes is now owner of the house. The Keeper then turns to Thomas's disposition and attempts to re-register the disposition. However, the Keeper rejects Thomas's disposition because Innes is now owner of the property, so Margaret's conveyance is no longer valid.

==== Example two: Advance Notices and multiple standard securities ====
Angus owns a flat in Hawick. Angus needs to raise money for his business and decides to obtain multiple secured loans from banks in order to help him. He travels to Edinburgh and goes to Bank A for a secured loan, offering Bank A a standard security in his flat. Bank A agrees to his terms and Bank A's solicitors draw up the required documentation. Angus consents to Bank A's solicitors applying for an Advance Notice to be placed in advance of registration of the standard security. The Keeper accepts the application for an advance notice and places it in the Application Record on 8 May.

Angus then goes to Bank B in Hawick and asks for a secured loan from Bank B, with a standard security offered in his flat. Bank B's solicitor, negligently, does not see the Bank A's advance notice when conducting due diligence and draws up the standard security documentation. Bank B has Angus validly sign the standard security. Bank B's solicitor sends this standard security for registration on 11 May. The Keeper registers Bank B's standard security and updates Section C of the flat's Title Sheet on 14 May 2020.

Bank A's solicitor sends Bank A's standard security on 14 May for registration. The Keeper receives it on 18 May and registers it, noting the Advance Notice in the Application Record. Angus's businesses financial problems worsen, and he defaults on his payments to both banks. As is standard practice, Bank A and Bank B independently both call-up the standard securities held in the flat after exhausting all normal channels.

Which standard security has priority in calling-up, and which bank is able to sell the flat to repay the money owed? Bank A. This is because the Advance Notice has forced the standard security of Bank B to be re-registered after Bank A's standard security. Yet, without an Advance Notice, Bank B's standard security would outrank Bank A's standard security, as it was registered first, by application of the principle of prior tempore, prior jure ("earlier in time, stronger in law").

While it may be argued that an Advance Notice appears unfair to the unwitting applicant who 'wins' the race to the registers, yet the applicant has their deed re-registered where a subsequent deed protected by an Advance Notice is registered during the protected period. However, the Application Record is a public record, so the unknowing grantee (applicant) is "not disadvantaged as the grantee will know of the existence and potential effect of the advance notice...as it is on the Register."

=== Register of Inhibitions and Advance Notices ===
Inhibition is a form of diligence (i.e. judicial enforcement of a court decree) whereby the owner of heritable property can be inhibited from selling, disposing, or creating real rights in the property itself until payment of a debt is made. Inhibition is carried out under the Bankruptcy and Diligence etc. (Scotland) Act 2007, which established a statutory register, the Register of Inhibitions, that is under the care of the Keeper. An inhibition must be registered in the Register of Inhibitions for it to be valid, and a search of the Register of Inhibitions is considered a normal practice of due diligence in conveyancing transactions. Inhibition allows any conveyance to be voidable with the raising of an action for reduction ex capite inhibitionis ("on the grounds of inhibition"). The effect of this reduction allows the creditor to treat the property as if it is still owned by the debtor, irrespective of whether it has been subsequently transferred or not.

However, where an entry is added to the Register of Inhibitions during the protected period of an Advance Notice, the grantee of the protected deed will be able to purchase the property free of any effect of the inhibition. Where no Advance Notice applies but an inhibition is registered, the grantee may still be protected from inhibition by the good-faith protections for grantees under the 2007 Act.

=== Removal of Advance Notice ===
The protected period will elapse after 35 days, or may be longer under regulations made by the Scottish Ministers. When the Advance Notice lapses, the Keeper will remove it from the Application Record and place it in the Archive Record.

=== Discharge of Advance Notice ===
A discharge can also be obtained for an Advance Notice, terminating the protected period early. This is common where the sale of the property is not completed, so a disposition in favour of the individual named in the Advance Notice is no longer likely. The 2012 Act allows the deed granter to discharge the Advance Notice with the consent of the deed grantee. Where such an application for discharge is received, the Keeper must move the Advance Notice from the Application Record to the Archive Record. The moment of its removal from the Application Record is taken to be the moment of termination of the protected period.

== Caveat ==
Where litigation has been commenced in relation to heritable property, a Scottish Court may grant a warrant for the placement of a caveat (i.e. a warning, from the Latin verb cavēre, 'to be aware') in the Title Sheet of that property in the Land Register of Scotland. The applicant to the court for an order giving warrant for the placement of a caveat must prove the following to the court:

1. the applicant has a prima facie case on the merits of the proceedings,
2. were a warrant for placing the caveat not granted, there is a real and substantial risk that enforcement of any decree or order in the proceedings granted in favour of the applicant would be defeated or prejudiced by reason of the other party being likely to deal with the plot of land, and
3. in all the circumstances, including the effect which granting the warrant may have on any person having an interest, it is reasonable to make the order granting it.

When a caveat is placed into the Title Sheet, it will expire after a period of 12 months. Before the expiry of the 12-month period, the caveat may be discharged, renewed or recalled.

=== Effect of caveat ===
A caveat does not have the same legal effects as an inhibition of the property, a type of freeze diligence whereby the creditor is prevented, or inhibited, from conveyancing real rights in the property. Instead a caveat does not prevent the owner of the land from granting lesser real rights or transferring ownership in the land. However, where the owner does transfer the land when a caveat has been placed in the Title Sheet: the caveat affects (1) the Keeper's warranty given to the grantee; and (2) the caveat prevents the protection for good-faith grantees (see below).

=== Renewal of caveat ===
An applicant can apply for a caveat to be renewed (i.e. extended for another 12 months), if the applicant can prove to the court that on the balance of probabilities:

- the applicant has a prima facie case on the merits of the proceedings,
- were a warrant to renew the caveat not granted, there is a real and substantial risk that enforcement of any decree or order in the proceedings granted in favour of the applicant would be defeated or prejudiced by reason of the other party being likely to deal with the plot of land, and
- in all the circumstances, including the effect which renewing the caveat may have on any person having an interest, it is reasonable to make the order renewing it.

There is no limit on how many times an applicant can have a caveat renewed.

=== Restriction of caveat ===
Any person with an interest can apply to the court that originally granted the caveat, to have the caveat restricted. This is a useful legal mechanism for persons wishing to obtain a real right in the property. The onus for such an application lies on the original applicant to show that the court should not grant the restriction.

=== Recall of caveat ===
A caveat can be recalled by the court that granted it, thereby removing the caveat from the Land Register. The court may only do so where the court is no longer satisfied that:

- the applicant has a prima facie case on the merits of the proceedings,
- there is a real and substantial risk that enforcement of any decree or order in the proceedings granted in favour of the applicant would be defeated or prejudiced by reason of the other party being likely to deal with the plot of land, and
- in all the circumstances, including the effect which granting the warrant to place the caveat may have on any person having an interest, it is reasonable for the caveat to continue to have effect.

Again, the burden of proof lies with the applicant to show on the balance of probabilities why the caveat should not be recalled.

=== Discharge of caveat ===
Finally, a caveat can be discharged at the request of the original applicant, or any applicant that applied for the caveat's renewal.

== Duties to the Keeper ==
All individuals, including the applicant and their legal agents, have a duty of care to the Keeper to prevent the Keeper inadvertently making the Land Register inaccurate. The Keeper is entitled to be compensated by a person in breach of the duty which results in loss incurred, such as the Keeper having to pay compensation to another party.

This civil obligation, is reinforced by the criminal offence where an applicant, or their legal agent, (a) makes a materially false or misleading statement in relation to an application for registration knowing that, or being reckless as to whether, the statement is false or misleading, or (b) intentionally fails to disclose material information in relation to such an application or is reckless as to whether all material information is disclosed. However, the actus reus of this offence is similar to the Scots law offence of fraud; so the applicant may alternatively be prosecuted for his conduct as a fraud.

== See also ==
- Registers of Scotland – agency responsible for land registration
