= Laughing heir =

In the law of inheritance, a laughing heir is an heir who is legally entitled to inherit the property of a person who has died, even though that heir is only distantly related to the deceased, and therefore has no personal connection or reason to feel bereaved over the death.

In most jurisdictions, the law of intestacy requires that the property of a person who died without leaving a will must first go to that person's immediate family, such as a spouse, descendants, ascendants, or persons descended from the same parents or grandparents. Under the common law, if no such persons exist, the property passes to the nearest living person who can demonstrate some degree of kinship with the deceased, no matter how distant the relation.

Some jurisdictions have a laughing heir statute, which cuts off the right of inheritance when the remaining relatives become too remote. In such jurisdictions, if no relative falls within the limitation set by the statute, then the property escheats to the state.

In the United States, §2-103 of the Uniform Probate Code, which has been adopted by a number of states, sets the outer limits of the right to inheritance with grandparents, aunts and uncles, and first cousins. Under the code, heirs that are farther removed from the deceased are left with no claim to the estate at all. By contrast, some US states (such as Virginia) have extended the principle to cover the family of a predeceased spouse. In those states, if the decedent had been married, and their spouse had died before the decedent, and if the decedent had no blood relatives at all, then the decedent's property would pass to any living relatives of the spouse, no matter how remote.

== Jurisdictions with no "laughing heir" statute ==
=== Africa ===
- South Africa

=== North America ===
- Kentucky
- Virginia (also extends inheritance rights to relatives of a predeceased spouse)

Until 2013, Texas had no laughing heir statute, instead allowing estates to pass to the nearest lineal ancestors or descendants "without end". Texas passed such a law (HB 2912) in 2013, and thereafter following the Uniform Probate Code.

== Jurisdictions with a "laughing heir" statute ==
=== North America ===
- Alabama (cuts off inheritance with descendants of the grandparents of the deceased)
- Florida (extends inheritance rights to relatives of a predeceased spouse up two grandparents' descendants after cutting off the inheritance of the decedent with the descendants of the grandparents of the deceased; however for Holocaust survivors the descendants of a decedent's great-grandparent may inherit)(Fla. Stat. §732.103)
- North Carolina (extends intestate inheritance out to five degrees of a kinship if they exist. If no kin within five degrees of kinship exist then it extends indefinitely in an attempt to prevent the estate from escheating)(NC General Statute 29–7)
