= Prescription (Scots law) =

Creation or extinction of personal and real rights

Prescription in Scots law allows the creation or extinction of personal and real rights. There are two forms of prescription:

1. positive prescription, which creates certain real rights, and
2. negative prescription, which extinguishes both personal and real rights.

Prescription is different from limitation, which prevents the raising of court proceedings or litigation in relation to civil law matters in Scottish courts, primarily affecting personal injury claims arising from delict as these are exempt from prescription. The terms prescription and limitation are used in other jurisdictions to describe similar rules, mainly due to shared Roman law and Civil law heritage.

The law of prescription, although a long-standing feature of Scots property law, has been the subject of modern reform, primarily following on from reports on the law by the Scottish Law Commission (SLC). The SLC's main reports on prescription, with some of the recommendations of these reports adopted and introduced into statute, are:

- Reform of the Law Relating to Prescription and Limitation of Actions (1970, SLC Report No 15)
- Prescription and Limitation of Actions (Latent Damage and Other Related Issues) (1989, SLC Report No 122)
- Personal Injury Actions: Limitation and Prescribed Claims (2007, SLC Report 207)
- Prescription (2017, SLC Report No 247)

Despite these reforms, the primary source of law regulating prescription is still the Prescription and Limitation (Scotland) Act 1973 (c. 52). The 1973 act was last subject to major reform under the Prescription (Scotland) Act 2018, which followed on from the SLC's 2017 Report.

== Positive prescription ==
Prescription Act 1469
- Act of Parliament
- Parliament of Scotland
- Long title: Anent the prescriptioun of obligationis nocht folowit within the space of fourty yeris.
- Citation: 1469 c. 4 [12mo ed: 1469 c. 28]

Dates
- Royal assent: 27 November 1469

Other legislation
- Repealed by: Prescription and Limitation (Scotland) Act 1973

Status: Repealed

Prescription Act 1474
- Act of Parliament
- Parliament of Scotland
- Long title: Anentis the Act of prescripcione of obligacionis.
- Citation: 1474 c. 9 [12mo ed: 1474 c. 54]

Dates
- Royal assent: 9 May 1474

Other legislation
- Repealed by: Prescription and Limitation (Scotland) Act 1973

Status: Repealed

Prescription Act 1617
- Act of Parliament
- Parliament of Scotland
- Long title: Anent prescriptioun of heretable Rightis.
- Citation: 1617 c. 12 [12mo ed: 1617 c. 12]

Dates
- Royal assent: 28 June 1617

Other legislation
- Repealed by: Prescription and Limitation (Scotland) Act 1973

Status: Repealed

Positive prescription allows the creation of real rights through the passage of time. It was first introduced into Scots law by the Prescription Act 1469 (c. 4 (S)) and the Prescription Act 1474 (c. 9 (S)). However, it came into greater usage following the Prescription Act 1617 (c. 12 (S)), an act of the Parliament of Scotland:

ACT XII Regarding prescription of heritable rights
Our sovereign lord, considering the great prejudice which his majesty's lieges sustain in their lands and heritages, not only by the abstracting, corrupting and concealing of their true evidents in their minority and less age and by the omission thereof, by the injury of time, through war, plague, fire or such occasions, but also by the counterfeiting and forging of false evidents and writs and concealing of the same to such a time that all means of improving thereof is taken away, whereby his majesty's lieges are constituted in a great uncertainty of their heritable rights and diverse pleas and actions are moved against them after expiring of 30 or 40 years, which nevertheless by the civil law and by the laws of all nations are declared void and ineffectual; and his majesty, according to his fatherly care which his majesty has to ease and remove the grievances of his subjects, being willing to cut off all occasions of pleas and to put them in certainty of their heritage in all time coming, therefore his majesty, with advice and consent of the estates of parliament, by the tenor of this present act, statutes, finds and declares that whatsoever his majesty's lieges, their predecessors and authors have possessed heretofore, or shall happen to possess in time coming by themselves, their tenants and others having their rights, their lands, baronies, annualrents and other heritage by virtue of their heritable infeftments made to them by his majesty, or others their superiors and authors for the space of 40 years, continuously and together following and ensuing the date of their said infeftments, and that peaceably without any lawful interruption made to them therein during the said space of 40 years, that such persons, their heirs and successors shall never be troubled, pursued nor deprived in the heritable right and property of their said lands and heritages foresaid by his majesty or others their superiors and authors, their heirs and successors, nor by any other person pretending right to the same by virtue of prior infeftments, public or private...

While the wording of the act indicates that positive prescription was introduced to serve as a method of rectifying situations where the lieges (ie: the King of Scot's subjects) had lost important documents proving their ownership of held property, commentators such as Wightman argue that the introduction of positive prescription was actually a "means to legitimise the appropriation of land which had never been granted to the owner in the first place." and the Prescription Act 1617 allowed holders of land to become owner through the passage of 40 years possession. This primarily affected lands owned by the Church of Scotland and its officials, following the Reformation in Scotland.

Today, the usage of positive prescription is strictly limited in application to specific claims, as explained below.

=== Positive prescription of right of ownership ===
The real right of ownership in Scots law can be created as an original mode of acquisition of corporeal heritable property (ie: it is not derivative acquisition, where ownership is acquired from another upon a voluntary or involuntary transfer). Positive prescription of ownership arises where land has been possessed openly, peaceably and without any judicial interruption for ten years and possession followed the registration/recording of a ex facie valid deed in the Land Register/General Register of Sasines. The registration process that commences the running of the positive prescriptive period is known as a prescriptive claim under the Land Registration (Scotland) Act 2012.

=== Positive prescription of servitudes ===
Servitudes, similar to easements in other jurisdictions, are capable of creation by positive prescription. The requirements are:

- The rights under the prescriptive positive servitude has been exercised openly, peaceably and without judicial interruption for a period of twenty years.
- The exercise of the rights are founded upon an a non domino deed which terms are sufficient to create a servitude of the nature of the prescriptive servitude.

After the 20 year prescriptive period concludes, the existence of the servitude is beyond legal challenge. However, while the servitude may validly exist under Scots law, still may not be appear on the Land Register, as acquisition by prescription is one of the main exemptions from the requirements of registration of real rights.

=== Positive prescription of public rights of way ===
Public rights of way are capable of creation by prescription under the Prescription and Limitation (Scotland) Act 1973. The requirements are:

- The right of way has been exercised openly, peaceably and without judicial interruption for a period of twenty years.

After the 20 year prescriptive period concludes, the existence of the public right of way is beyond legal challenge. Similarly to prescriptive servitudes, a public right of way may not be denoted in the Land Register but still validly exist. ScotWays, the Scottish Rights of Way Access Society, maintains a public register of rights of way, the National Catalogue of Rights of Way, in order to raise awareness of the existence of public rights of way in Scotland.

== Negative prescription ==
Negative prescription allows for the extinction of obligations and rights (both real and personal). This is because Scots law adopts the Roman law principle that vigilantibus non dormientibus jura subveniunt (lit. 'the law assists those that are vigilant with their rights, and not those that sleep on them'). The Scottish Law Commission discuss the important aspects of negative prescription:

"Negative prescription plays an essential part in balancing individual interests on the one hand and serving the public interest on the other. Justice between the parties to litigation means that after a certain lapse of time it is actually fairer to deprive a pursuer of a right than to allow it to trouble a defender. That is connected with concerns about stale or missing evidence and the difficulties facing a court in trying to administer justice in those circumstances. There is another dimension too: there is more to prescription than justice between the parties to a particular case. There is a wider public interest in having litigation initiated promptly if it is to be initiated at all. That is conducive to legal certainty. Even if in an individual case prescription may seem to involve hardship, as long as the law of prescription strikes a fair balance overall, it serves the wider interests of fairness, justice and certainty. It is for the legislature to decide what the appropriate time-limits should be, and what should be the exceptions or qualifications to them. A well moderated law of prescription will serve the public interest by promoting legal certainty and the efficient use of resources. In this way it can make a valuable contribution to a strong sustainable economy"

=== Short negative, or quinquennial, prescription ===
Short prescription occurs where rights and obligations have a prescriptive period of five years. The Prescription and Limitation (Scotland) Act 1973 provides that monetary obligations (ie: the legal obligation to pay a sum of money to another under contract, delict or unjustified enrichment) are subject to a five-year prescriptive period. This includes:

- any obligation to pay a sum of money due in respect of interest;
- any obligation to pay a sum of money due in respect of an instalment of an annuity;
- any obligation to pay a sum of money due in respect of by of ground annual or other periodical payment under a contract of ground annual;
- any obligation to pay a sum of money due in respect of rent or other periodical payment under a lease;
- any obligation to pay a sum of money due in respect of a periodical payment in respect of the occupancy or use of land;
- any obligation to pay a sum of money due in respect of a periodical payment under a land obligation;
- any obligation to pay a sum of money due in respect of redress of unjustified enrichment, including without prejudice to that generality any obligation of restitution, repetition or recompense;
- any obligation to pay a sum of money arising from an individual acting as negotiorurn gestio, a form of agency in Scots law.
- any obligation to pay a sum of money due in respect of liability (whether arising from any enactment or from any rule of law) to make reparation;
- any obligation to pay a sum of money due under a bill of exchange or a promissory note;
- any obligation to pay a sum of money due in respect of an obligation to account, other than accounting for trust funds;
- any obligation to pay a sum of money due in respect of any obligation arising from, or by reason of any breach of, a contract or promise, not being any obligation already falling within the five-year period.

Therefore, if any of the above obligations fail to be enforced within five years of its existence, the obligation prescribes and it becomes unenforceable. However, the prescriptive period 'clock' does not take into account any period in which the debtor of the obligation (i.e. the person obliged to make payment) has acted fraudulently, or his words or conduct induces the creditor to make an error, to prevent enforcement. However, while most monetary obligations are covered by the five year prescriptive period, the following obligations are specifically exempt from the 5-year prescriptive period:

- any obligation arising from a decree of court, an arbitration award or an order of a tribunal or authority exercising jurisdiction under any enactment;
- any obligation arising from the issue of a banknote;
- any obligation constituted or evidenced by a probative writ, not being a cautionary obligation nor being an obligation relating to interest.
- to any obligation under a contract of partnership or of agency, not being an obligation remaining, or becoming, prestable on or after the termination of the relationship between the parties under the contract;
- except for obligation involving negotorium gestio, any obligation relating to land (including an obligation to recognise a servitude);
- to any obligation arising out of succession law and inheritance rights under the Succession (Scotland) Act 1964.
- any obligation to make reparation in respect of personal injuries or in respect of the death of any person as a result of such injuries

=== Long negative prescription ===
Any obligation, including those covered or exempted by short-prescription, will prescribe after 20 years, by the passage of the long prescriptive period. This includes real rights which have not been exercised for over 20 years bar those immprescriptible. The passage of 20 years is considered the long-stop date for all obligations and real rights bar those specified as imprescriptible or relating to personal injury.

=== Imprescriptible rights ===
Certain rights and obligations do not prescribe, either by short or long negative prescription:

- the real right of ownership of corporeal heritable property (land). As this only relates to land, loss of ownership of moveable property is still possible. However, while an owner of land's right cannot be extinguished by negative prescription, it can still be extinguished by operation of positive prescription by a possessor (see above).
- the real right of lease, this is only created by leases registered in the Land Register under the Registration of Leases (Scotland) Act 1857.
- any right exercisable as res merae facultatis. Despite being a long used phrase in Scots law, the definition of rights res merae facultatis (in Latin, lit: 'a matter of sheer ability') is uncertain. It is considered that these are property rights associated with ownership held over corporeal heritable property, either held in the owner's land itself or another neighbouring property, which cannot prescribe. The exact species of rights falling as res merae facultatits is subject to academic debate and conflicting decisions by the Scottish courts.
- any right to recover property extra commercium. These are described by Lord Polwarth, the then Minister of State for Scotland, as:

"property extra commercium comprises various categories of things which cannot be reduced into private ownership, either because of their nature, or because of some relevant rule of law. Particular examples are court records or other public documents which are held by whoever may have custody of them for the benefit of the community at large and not for the individual possessor. Where such articles are found in the possession of someone other than the proper custodian, it has been held that the latter's right to recover them does not prescribe: the right of recovery persists, however long may be the period of time during which they have been outside the legal custodian's control."

- Obligation of a trustee to produce accounts of the trustee's dealings with any property of the trust;
- Obligations of a trustee to make reparation or restitution in respect of any fraudulent breach of trust;
- Obligation to provide property to any person entitled to it under a trust, or the proceeds of any such property, in the possession of the trustee, or the value of any such property previously taken the trustee and appropriated to his own use;
- any obligation of a third party to make furthcoming to any person entitled to any trust property received by the third party otherwise than in good faith and in his possession;
- any right to recover stolen property from the person by whom it was stolen or from any person privy to the stealing thereof;
- any right to an estate as heir to an ancestor who died before the commencement of the Succession (Scotland) Act 1964;
- any right to take any steps necessary for making up or completing title to any interest in land.

== Prescription (Scotland) Act 2018 ==
Prescription (Scotland) Act 2018 (Note: Section 18.)
- Act of the Scottish Parliament
- Scottish Parliament
- Long title: An Act of the Scottish Parliament to amend the law relating to the extinction of rights and obligations by the passage of time.
- Citation: 2018 asp 15
- Territorial extent: Scotland

Dates
- Royal assent: 18 December 2018
- Commencement: 18 December 2018 (sections 15, 17 and 18); 28 February 2025 (rest of act); (Note: Section 17. The Prescription (Scotland) Act 2018 (Commencement, Saving and Transitional Provisions) Regulations 2022 (SI 2022/78).)

Other legislation
- Amends: Prescription and Limitation (Scotland) Act 1973; Social Security (Scotland) Act 2018

Status: Current legislation

Text of statute as originally enacted

Revised text of statute as amended

Text of the Prescription (Scotland) Act 2018 as in force today (including any amendments) within the United Kingdom, from legislation.gov.uk.

Various ambiguities of the Prescription and Limitation (Scotland) Act 1973 were reformed through the passage off the Prescription (Scotland) Act 2018 (asp 15).

The amendments now require that the creditor requires that:

- loss, injury or damage has occurred
- the said loss, injury or damage was caused by a person’s act or omission
- the identity of that person is known.

The amendments also introduce standstill requirements:

- the prescriptive period has started but not already expired
- the period is to extend by a maximum of one year
- it can only be entered into once in relation to the same obligation.

There were delays to the implementation of the law due to difficulty in the drafting of the transitional provisions as the law replaces the existing legislation. In 2022, the implementation process started with certain sections of the law being commenced. The remaining provisions are planned for a multi-year transition.
