= Accession (Scots law) =

Accession (Latin accessio) is a method of original acquisition of property under Scots property law. It operates to allow property (the accessory) to merge with (or accede to) another object (the principal), either moveable or heritable. Accession derives from the Roman-law concept of the same name. Other jurisdictions employ similar rules. The leading case in this area is said to be Brand's Trustees v Brand's Trustees (1876) 3 R (HL) 16.

A common example is a tree (the accessory) acceding to the land (the principal), thereby the tree is owned by the owner of the land on which it is planted by the operation of accession. Accession may appear similar to other modes of original acquisition, but each mode has discrete differences. Importantly, accession does not produce a new object (nova species) in itself, such as with specificatio; accession merely attaches one object (the accessory) to another (the principal).

== Types of accession ==
There are broadly two types of accession: (1) natural accession and (2) human accession.

=== Natural accession ===
Natural accession (accessio naturalis) occurs by the operation of nature alone. Examples: A tree sapling owned by C is planted in a garden owned by B; a cow belonging to F impregnates a cow belonging to G, thereby acceding ownership of the calf foetus to G.

=== Human accession ===
Industrial, or human, accession (accessio artificialis) occurs when property is merged artificially, such as by welding, drilling or other permanent affixment. Example: a hood ornament owned by Z is welded to a car owned by a W.

== Requirements for accession ==
It is now recognised that there are three requirements for accession to occur, irrespective if human or natural accession. These are:

=== (1) Physical union ===
Accession requires a physical bond or attachment between the two objects. Example: a tree can be physically attached to land by taking root.

=== (2) Functional subordination ===
The accessory must be functionally subordinate to the principal.

=== (3) Permanency ===
The accessory must be merged to the principal in a permanent manner. This is to ensure that attachments of short length do not create an accession. Example: A tent recently affixed to the land it is erected upon does not accede as there is no permanency.

The test for accession is said to be applied "mechanically", i.e. the circumstances of the accession are not analysed. Viscount Stair was of the opinion that accession can occur irrespective of the consent or bad faith in the merger of the accessory and principal. As consent is irrelevant, neither owner can contract out of accession occurring.

== Legal effects of accession ==
There are three legal effects where accession has occurred, whereby the principal and accessory become owned by the principal's owner inseverably. These are:

=== (1) The accessory becomes part of the principal ===
The accessory, as a matter of property law, becomes an inherent part of the principal. This means that where the ownership of the principal is transferred, ownership will travel with it, e.g. when a house is sold, the tree planted in the garden of the house is transferred with the land.

=== (2) Conversion ===
If the accessory is a different class to the principal, the accessory will be reclassified (i.e. converted) as the class of the principal. Example: the tree planted in the garden of a house is no longer a corporeal moveable property, but is considered corporeal heritable property.

=== (3) Extinction of title ===
Ownership of the accessory is extinguished by ownership of the principal. In circumstances where ownership (title) of an accessory was held by a separate individual from the owner of the principal, the owner of the principal becomes the owner of the accessory. Thus, ownership of the accessory is extinguished. Example: A tree sapling, owned by C, is planted in the garden of a house owned by D. At the moment it is considered to have acceded, i.e. when the tree takes root in the soil of the garden, thereby meeting the above three tests of accession, ownership of the tree now belongs to D.

==== Compensation ====
There is no legal authority for compensating owners of accessories who have had their right extinguished by natural accession. However, where extinction of a separate individual's ownership occurs by way of industrial, or human, accession (e.g. a hood ornament, owned by Z, is welded to a car, owned by a W), compensation from the principal owner is available only where the principal's owner instructed the accessory's owner to merge the object, or the principal merged the accessory himself. Where an accessory owner has the merged the object, compensation is not recoverable unless the owner of the accessory acted in good faith and has a reasonable, but mistaken, belief that he owned the principal. In such circumstances, the law of unjustified enrichment, part of the Scots law of obligations applies. Where a third party, and is not an agent of the two owners, has merged the two objects to cause accession; compensation is recoverable from the third party. As compensation falls as part of a personal right, enforcement of a right of compensation does not apply to subsequent owners of the principal.

== Separation of accessory ==
If the accessory is removed from the principal, eg: the tree in the house of the garden owned by D (see above examples) is dug up by a thief, E, the property is reconverted to its original class of property (e.g.: the tree, once uprooted, is considered a moveable again) and is considered an independent piece of property again. However, ownership of the accessory does not fall by occupatio to the removing individual but is widely considered to remain with the owner of the principal before the accession. However, there is authority in Scots law that the original owner of the accessory obtains ownership so this rule may subject to subsequent clarification, eg: the young tree planted by C in the garden belonging to D, uprooted and stolen by E would legally belong to C again under this interpretation of the law of accession.

== Moveable accessory acceding to heritable principal ==
Moveable accessories that have acceded to a heritable principal are known as fixtures, with similar concepts of the same name found in other legal jurisdictions. Fixtures, i.e. that which has acceded by the three rules above, should not be confused with fittings (such as chairs, desks, drawers). Fixtures alone transfer with the heritable principal, fittings do not.

The three requirements for accession must always be met. However it is possible for the weight of a fitting alone to cause it to accede to the heritable property, irrespective of the physical union to the land. Functional subordination must also apply here too, the accessory must be functionally subordinate to the heritable property for it to accede. Difficulty can arise where it can be difficult to identify where a fixture is functionally subordinate, as such the issue of functional subordination is dependent of the fact of the case at hand. The test for functional subordination of fixtures is expressed by Gretton & Steven as:

"does the item appear to be attached for the improvement of the land or for the better enjoyment of the item?"

In certain situations, a constructive fixture can accede to heritable property where it traditionally would not be considered to be an accessory. A notable example of this is the keys to a house or moveable parts of a machine that itself is a fixture of heritable property.

As discussed above, due to the narrow test for fixtures, it is common practice for fittings to also be included in the sale and subsequent transfer in any event, either expressly or impliedly as a matter of Scots contract law. It is common practice, for example in the missives of sale of a house, to include certain fittings such as whitegoods or curtains, as is the case with the Scottish Standard Clauses. This means that a voluntary transfer of fittings will also take place when the heritable property is sold to avoid any disputes or litigation as to what it is classified as a fixture or fitting.

== Heritable accessory acceding to heritable moveable ==
Heritable property is capable of acceding to other heritable property, known as alluvion after the Roman law method of acquisition of the same name. This primarily operates by rivers or other moving-waters such as the tide depositing sediment, or alluvium, deposited by a river. It should not be confused with avulsion, which occurs when there is a deposit of sediment after a heavy storm or other weather event.

== Accession of fruits ==
Certain fruits, fructus, or products (the accessory) accede to the property (the principal) that created them. The institutional writers considered there were three cases where accession of fruits occurs:

=== Animals in utero ===
Animal young in the womb belong to the owner of the mother while the offspring remains in utero (gestation period or pregnancy). The accession ends upon the birth of the young; however, since the owner of the principal will still retain ownership of the accessory (see above), the young will belong to their mother's owner.

=== Natural products of plants and animals ===
Natural products of plants (e.g. sap, flowers, fruits etc.) and animals (milk, fur, honey etc.) accede to the principal until they are physically separated.

=== Trees, plants, crops ===
Trees, plants and other crops accede to the land (heritable accessory) in which they take root. However, an important exception is made for industrial crops, which do not accede to the land they are rooted in.
