= Land in English law =

Legal Term

The meaning of land in English law encompasses a number of things, beyond the earth itself, such as fixtures, and easements. Its definition is practically important in English land law, because when a purchase of property in land is made, without specifying what exactly will be transferred, the law must give an answer as to what should accompany the transfer. Property in land, under the English system of rules, is said to be "four dimensional". It covers not just area (two dimensions), but also things below the surface and above (three dimensions), and extends over a period of time (four dimensions).

== Statutory meaning ==
The Law of Property Act 1925, section 205(1)(ix) gives the following definition of land.

"Land" includes land of any tenure, mines and minerals, whether or not held apart from the surface, buildings or parts of buildings (whether the division is horizontal, vertical or made in any other way) and other hereditaments; also a manor, advowson, and a rent and other incorporeal hereditaments, and an easement, right, privilege or benefit in, over, or derived from land...

== Three dimensions ==
The Act goes on to define "mines and minerals" as "any strate or seam of minerals or substances in or under any land, and powers of working and getting the same". It goes on further to define a "hereditament" as "any real property which on an intestacy occurring before the commencement of this Act might have devolved upon an heir". The legal maxim is cuius est solum eius est usque ad coelum et ad inferos, which is Latin for "he who owns the land owns everything up to the heavens and down to the depths."

Since the 13th century this has been complicated by flying freeholds, the right of aircraft to fly over a property (as in Bernstein of Leigh v Skyviews & General Ltd), the Crown's claim on certain resources and mineral rights (as in the Case of Mines Coal Industry Act 1994, Petroleum Act 1998) and treasure (Treasure Act 1996). Nevertheless, cases such as Kelsen v Imperial Tobacco Co Ltd and Laiquat v Majid illustrate that the courts generally support the freeholder's right to control things that overhang or underlie the ground he holds.

== Fixtures ==
The legal maxim is quicquid plantatur solo, solo cedit, which is Latin for "that which is fixed to the land becomes part of it". Holland v Hodgson explored this. The context was the question of whether looms installed in a factory formed part of the land. Blackburn J said that an object resting on the ground and "attached" to it only by its weight will not normally be part of the land, but it is relevant to ask what was intended. So, for example, a pile of stones in a field is not part of the land, but if the stones are arranged into a dry stone wall then the wall has become a part of it. In Botham v TSB Plc it was decided at appeal that things easily removed, such as curtains and carpets, are not part of the land, but things not easily removed, such as taps and plugs, are. In Chelsea Yacht and Boat Club v Pope it was held that a houseboat does not form part of the land because it is insufficiently fixed.

== Water ==
In the law of England and Wales, land may lie under water, but the water does not necessarily form part of the land. The Land Registration Act 2002, section 132 (1)(b) says that "land" includes land covered with water. For most practical purposes, water may be used by the person owning the land on which it is, but there are restrictions on some activities, such as large-scale abstractions of water or activities which may pollute it (see, for example, the Water Resources Act 1991). Tidal waters are treated differently. They generally belong to the Crown or to a local authority, and the public has the right to pass over tidal waters and to fish in them.

== See also ==
- English land law
- English trusts law
- English property law
