= Avulsion =

Avulsion in general refers to a tearing away. Specifically, it can refer to:

- Avulsion fracture, when a fragment of bone tears away from the main mass of bone as a result of physical trauma
- Avulsion injury, in which a body structure is detached from its normal point of insertion, either torn away by trauma or cut by surgery
- Avulsion (legal term), the sudden loss of land by the action of water
- Avulsion (river), abandonment of an old river channel and the formation of a new one
