= Disposition (Scots law) =

Deed transferring ownership of heritable property

A disposition in Scots law is a formal deed transferring ownership of corporeal heritable property. It acts as the conveyancing stage as the second of three stages required in order to voluntarily transfer ownership of land in Scotland. The three stages are:

1. The Contractual Stage (The Missives of Sale)
2. The Conveyancing Stage
3. The Registration Stage

In the conveyancing stage of the transfer of ownership of land, a formal document called a disposition, is created and subscribed by the Disponer (the person granting the disposition or 'the Seller') and the Disponee (the person receiving the disposition or 'the Buyer'). Example dispositions are available to view on the Property Standardisation Group website.

== Principles of transfer: why dispositions are required in Scots Law ==
=== An absolute singular (unititular) right of ownership ===
Scots law follows the Roman law principle that the right of ownership in property (for definition of term see above) is absolute. Other legal systems such as United States jurisdictions consider ownership as a 'bundle of rights' which can be separated into different components and separated amongst different individuals. Instead in Scots law, ownership is a singular unitary right, that cannot be broken down into different components, it can only be transferred to another in whole or be encumbered through the creation of inferior real rights. The owner of a 'thing' has the right to usus, fructus, abusus - the right to use, to the fruits (enjoyment) and the right to abuse or destroy the property.

In contrast to historically feudal systems such as England and Wales or Scotland (Davidian Revolution - 28 November 2004), ownership is not split among individuals, such as interests held by a feudal superior. Because ownership is a single right, when it is transferred, it transfers instantaneously, with the previous Owner being deprived of all ownership in the property, at the moment of registration in the Land Register.

=== Principle of traditio ===
Scots law follows the principle that traditionibus non nudis pactis dominia rerum transferuntur: ownership is transferred by delivery (or other conveyance) and not by bare contract. As discussed above, a contract or delict only creates binding personal obligations, rights in rem (real rights) are not capable of transfer by contract alone. Instead a conveyance (Ie: a formal transfer of the property) is required. Personal rights, rights in personam, such as those like the Missives of Sale (i.e.: a contract for the sale of corporeal heritable property) alone does not transfer the real right of ownership in itself. Without a conveyance, i.e.: the deed of disposition, and public act (see below), real rights cannot be validly created in Scots law.

==== Intent and consent ====
Where a voluntary transfer is made, the conveyance itself must be made with the intent and consent of both parties. The disponer (usually a Seller under a prior contract of sale) must have the intention to be divested of ownership and the disponee (usually a Buyer under a prior contract of sale) must have the intent to acquire the property. The intent and consent of both parties will be expressed in the disposition deed itself.

=== Principle of abstraction ===
Only a conveyance, as a separate legal act, can effect the transfer agreed to by contract between the parties. Scotland has an abstract property legal system, meaning the conveyance does rely on the causa of the transfer. In Scots law the recognised causae traditionis for transfer of property are:

- loan for consumption (mutuum),
- gift
- excambion (i.e. an exchange)
- sale
- ex facie absolute disposition (prospectively abolished in 1970)
- transfer in trust, expressly or otherwise.

The validity of the conveyance (i.e. the transfer of property) does not depend on the validity of these causae, as Viscount Stair describes:

"We do not follow that subtility of annulling deeds, because they are sine causa [i.e. without a cause (see above)] … and therefore narratives expressing the cause of the disposition, are never inquired into, because, though there were no cause, the disposition is good.’ [Brackets added]

Therefore, Scotland differs from common-law jurisdictions such as England & Wales, who operate on a causal system where the cause of the transfer is capable of annulling the transfer overall. By requiring a conveyance stage as well as the formation of a contract, Scots law adopts the traditio system where the cause of the transfer may be void or voidable, but the conveyance remains legally valid. Areas of Scots law, such as the law of sale in contract law have been, what is termed by some Scots legal academics as, "anglicised", as a result of UK parliament legislation that was based on English law principles but introduced into Scots law: such as the introduction of the floating charge or the sale of moveable property into Scots law. In all other cases bar the sale of corporeal moveable property, the principle of abstraction is evident in Scots law.

==== Labes reales or vitium reale ====
While a conveyance may be valid irrespective of the causa traditionis, the reasons for the causa's invalidity under the law of obligations, succession, etc. may also extend to invalidate the intent to transfer as a vitium reale or labes reales (i.e. a 'real vice') in property law. A contract may fail for numerous reasons, e.g.: it may not be formally valid, the parties may lack capacity or some other mental defect affecting capacity generally or there may be no consensus in idem (i.e. a meeting of the minds in which the parties agree on the essential elements of the contract). However, only such defect in the contract, that are capable of being a vitium reale can serve to invalidate the transfer. Therefore, it is often termed that 'a good conveyance is capable of saving a bad contract' because property continues to be owned by the disponee irrespective of the failure of the causa.

==== Absolutely good, void and voidable transfers ====
Accordingly, a transfer of ownership of property can therefore be (1) absolutely good, (2) void or (3) voidable.

(1) An absolutely good transfer will give the disponee (or buyer) an absolutely good title. This means that an owner with absolutely good title will be immune from challenge of his ownership.

(2) A void title is one where the ostensible (i.e. the apparent) owner has no legal basis for ownership. A void voluntary transfer commonly occurs where the disponer (i.e. the seller) has no ownership of the property sold or he lacks transactional capacity and has transferred the property to the disponee (i.e. the buyer). The term void transfer can be characterised as a void ab initio (i.e. void from the beginning) and is null and no effect. The effect of a transfer or other act that is void with null and no effect can be explained as if the documents of the transfer were blank pieces of paper.

(3) A voidable transfer results in the disponee (typically a buyer or receiver of a gift, a donee) obtaining a valid title, a subsistent title, to the property but this title can be defeated by challenge in court, i.e. it can be reduced (judicially terminated by court order), by someone of a better legal claim to the property. This arises typically where there is a vice of consent.

=== Publicity principle ===
A large feature of Scots property law, is the publicity principle and the legal doctrine surrounding it. The publicity principle requires that in transfers of all property, there is a need for an external (i.e.: public) act in order to create or transfer real rights (or rights in rem). In Scots law, the publicity principle has not been analysed in great detail. However, the Scottish Law Commission have noted that the reliance on the public register provides certainty and security for the parties engaging the sale of land. The rationale for the requirement of an external act is subject to academic debate but it is broadly recognised that the publicity principles serves the purposes of (1) providing legal certainty of ownership without reliance on litigation, (2) securing an Owner's real right (or right in rem) by way of reference to a recorded public act and, (3) protects third parties who may be unaware of any private agreements an Owner may be subject to.

==== The race to the registers ====
Historically in Scotland, it was common for Sellers to grant multiple dispositions in one piece of land, often as an attempt to defraud multiple Buyers. The passage of the Registration Act 1617 by the estates of parliament of the Kingdom of Scotland was as an attempt to curtail this fraud by placing a registration requirement on transfers of ownership; allowing Buyers to act on reliance of the public register when they contracted. Importantly, the Real Rights Act 1693 provided that dispositions would rank in order of the date of registration'. This legal rule, still in force today, gives rise to the concept of the 'race to the registers in which the disponee (commonly, the Buyer following the conclusion of missives of sale) must record the disposition granted to him in the Land Register, thwarting all other potential third party claims to ownership. The race has been characterised by the distinguished judge, Lord Rodger of Earlsferry:

"a struggle in deadly earnest with the aim of destroying the other competitor's chance to obtain the real right by recording the relevant deed and infefting himself first. Those taking part in this race are no Corinthians and swear no Olympic oath of sportsmanship. If your opponent is slow off the mark, mistakes the way or stumbles, you do not chivalrously wait for him to catch up: you take full advantage of his mistakes. Nice guys finish last and don't get the real right."

In practice, the introduction of Advance Notices under the Land Registration (Scotland) Act 2012 has reduced the 'struggle' in the race to the register. However, it still remains valid that only registration in the Land Register is capable of transferring or creating real rights (or rights in rem).

The above three principles together create three stages of transfer:

1. The Causa
2. The Conveyance
3. The Public Act

All three steps must be fulfilled in order to validly transfer real rights in Scots law.

== Prior communings rule and clauses ==
At common law, following Winston v Patrick, the delivery of a disposition to a disponee supersedes any personal obligations in the contract, even if collateral in nature under operation of the prior communings rule. The Contract (Scotland) Act 1997 altered this common law rule, so that the missives are no longer superseded by the disposition. However, many conveyancers still include the use of a 2-year supersession clause in the Missives of Sale to ensure that contractual obligations come to end after 2 years rather than the running the full statutory 20-year period under the Prescription and Limitation (Scotland) Act 1973. The use of this clause will apply to both Buyer's and Seller's obligations under the contract.

== Disposition (deed) ==
Historically, under the feudal system, the conveyancing stage was carried out by feudal deed such as feu dispositions or Charters of Novodamus but their usage as a means of transferring ceased on 28 December 2004. Example current dispositions for both commercial and residential property can be found on the Property Standardisation Group website.

Instead the legal transfer is carried through the issuance of a formal document by the Seller (the Granter of the disposition) called a disposition when discussing heritable property in favour of the Buyer (the grantee of the disposition). Dispositions must be in writing and be formally subscribed under the Requirements of Writing (Scotland) Act 1995. An example of a modern disposition can be found on the Property Standardisation Group website:

"2 Narrative

2.1 The Seller is the proprietor of the Property.

2.2 The Seller has sold the Property to the Purchaser for the Price.

2.3 The Seller acknowledges receipt of the Price.

3 Disposition

The Seller DISPONES the Property to the Purchaser."

As shown, the disposition acts in furtherance of the causa of the transfer, commonly a contract of sale, and effects the transfers (the disponement) of the property itself . However, a disposition still requires registration in the Land Register of Scotland. The Inner House of the Court of Session notes that a disposition:

“operates as an actual alienation of the subject to the disponee; and it vests in him most of the essential attributes of ownership. In particular it vests in him not only a right to possess the subject and to reap its fruits but also a power to sell it; to dispone it for either onerous or gratuitous causes; and to settle the estate by mortis causa dispositions ....The right so created is transmissible from one person to another by voluntary disposition; and on the death of any person, in whom it is vested, it is transmissible to his heir by general service; and each person in whom it is vested successively has the powers and privileges of ownership above mentioned."

== Other functions of a disposition ==
Contractual Provisions

A disposition may contain contractual obligations which become a binding contract on acceptance of the disposition by the Buyer. Under the operation of the prior communings rule, see above, the disposition may supersede any previous contractual obligations found in the Missives of Sale.

Assignations (In common law jurisdictions, termed assignment)

The disposition may also assign ancillary rights to the Buyer. This includes any rents payable to the Seller as a landlord and any writs or deeds concerning the property. Express assignations can also be made under Conveyancing (Scotland) Act 1874. As with all assignations, they still require to be intimated (notified) to the debtor of the rights assigned. The Scottish Parliament is currently considering the reform of moveable transactions, including assignations, following the publication of the Scottish Law Commission's Report on Moveable Transactions (2017, SLC Report No 249). This may include the creation of a Register of Assignations and further reform the law in this area.

== Warrandice (guarantees) of dispositions ==
A full and absolute warrandice (in other jurisdictions called a warranty) is implied in law in the granting of a disposition. Even a simple usage of "I grant warrandice" in the disposition is enough to make a full and absolute warrandice in a disposition. However, where the property is a gift, the giftee only receives simple warrandice in the disposition covering (3), below, alone. A further exception is where the property is acquired under-value and only a fact and deed warrandice is granted under the disposition (covering (1), (2) and (3) below).

Typically, when the Seller grants the disposition, the Seller therefore will warrant (i.e.: guarantee) the following four warranties:

1. Absolute Good Title
2. No lesser real rights (i.e.: no liferent or security etc. in the land)
3. No unusual real conditions (i.e.: no unusual burdens or servitudes attached to the land)
4. No future acts will be made prejudicial to the Buyer's title (ownership) to the land.

In practice, these warranties are often expressly granted, which will vary or add to the implied warranties of the Seller, such as the use of the Scottish Standard Clauses. In the unlikely event that the missives are silent as to warranties, those implied by law will apply.

=== Warrant 1: Absolute good title ===
The Seller warrants that he is able to convey ownership validly to the Buyer. The warrant also covers that the Seller's right of ownership (title) is absolutely good, and not voidable or excluded from the Keeper of the Register of Scotland's indemnity. Hume, the institutional writer, and source of law in Scotland, says the Seller must furnish the Buyer with evidence that the title is good. The warrant must cover the whole of the property transferred, i.e.: the Seller must own all of the land that is agreed to be transferred under the Missives of Sale. An example of this can be commonly found in case law where the Seller contracts to transfer the entire land, that is to say a coele usuque ad centrum (from the heavens to the centre of the Earth) but the mineral rights, found in the strata of the land as a separate conventional tenement, are not owned by the Seller but by a third party but would be warranted to be transferred to the Buyer. Following Holms v Ashford Estates Ltd, it is settled that a warrant that the land transferred is fit for the purpose the Buyer has informed the Seller it was to be used does not fall within this warranty.

=== Warrant 2: No lesser real rights ===
The Seller warrants that there are no lesser real rights held in the land that is to be transferred, excluding leases.

Leases have conflicting legal authority on whether they are covered by the Seller's no lesser real rights warranty. Older legal authorities from the 16th and 17th century Kingdom of Scotland courts appear to suggest that the implied warranty does not cover leases. The rationale for this was that historically, feudal owners would rarely occupy the land they owned, which was often leased or given to vassals through subinfeudation so a warranty that land has no lesser real rights was not relevant. However, Hume, the institutional writer, and source of law in Scotland, wrote that only leases of a very long duration, at low rent, or where the lease gives the tenant large-ranging powers over the land, would be covered by this warranty. The modern source of authority in this area is Lothian and Border Farmers Ltd v M'Cutcheon which followed the old authorities that a lease was not covered by warranty. However, there is academic criticism that this decision was incorrect, and remains a first instance judgment of the Outer House of the Court of Session. In any event, conveyancers will often add a clause to the missives, as is done in the Scottish Standard Clauses, that the property will be provided to the seller for entry and vacant possession.

The occupancy rights of a spouse under the Matrimonial Homes (Family Protection) (Scotland) Act 1981 are akin to a statutory quasi-real right and it is uncertain whether this is included in the warranty. In any event, it is standard practice to include a term in the missives concerning occupancy rights, as is done in the Scottish Standard Clauses in the Missives of Sale.

=== Warrant 3: No unusual real conditions ===
It was established definitively in 1835 that real conditions, such as servitudes and burdens, were covered by the absolute warranty made by the Seller. It is now implied in law that a Seller warrants that there are no real conditions on the property where:

1. that the condition was unknown to the Buyer at the time when the missives concluded;
2. that the condition is unusual either generally or in relation to the type and location of the property in question; and
3. that the condition results in a material diminution in the value of the property.

All three tests must be satisfied for a claim in warrandice to succeed against an unknown real condition. In practice, due diligence checks by each parties' agents should identify any previously unknown real conditions prior to the conclusion of missives.When determining knowledge, the court will look at whether by the Buyer's "negligence and inexcusabill ignorance" (translated from Scots: negligence and inexcusable ignorance) prevented him from having actual knowledge, if it did the court may hold the Buyer had constructive knowledge, knowledge based on the exercise of reasonable care. Therefore, a Buyer is deemed to know of and to expect real conditions of a standard type. If the Seller avers, i.e.: makes a factual submission to the court, that the Buyer knew of the condition at the date of the conclusion of missives, the Seller alone must prove this evidential onus. Where the court finds that a Buyer acted with negligence and inexcusabill ignorance, thereby rejecting the warranty claim; parties who acted through a solicitor may pursue a claim against the agent handling the sale for professional negligence, as a more appropriate and effective remedy where the solicitor failed to exercise reasonable care.

=== Warrant 4: No future acts will be made prejudicial to the Buyer's title to (ownership of) the land ===
The fourth warranty guarantees that the Seller will take no future acts that would prejudice the Buyer's contractual right to ownership. A Seller would breach their warranty where they grant a subsequent disposition to another individual or subsequently grant lesser real rights in the land to third parties after the Buyer has received their disposition. This warranty ceases to be relevant once ownership validly transfers to the Buyer, following the registration of the disposition. Where land is given gratuitously (i.e.: a gift), the giftee only receives a simple warrandice covering no future prejudicial acts.

=== Breach and enforcement of warrandice in a disposition claim ===
Where the holder of a warranty believes there to be a breach, it might prove impossible to trace the Seller or their predecessors following the completion of the transfer process. The remedy for breach of warrandice of disposition is damages. As such their efficacy as a legal remedy for Buyers later discovering latent defects in the property's title is limited. In warrandices of a disposition, there is generally no requirement for eviction. However, if the Buyer wishes to rely on the Seller's warranty that the title conveyed was absolutely good, see warrandice 1 above, he must prove he has been judicially evicted or has a serious threat of judicial eviction. The warrandice of a disposition has been given recent treatment by the Supreme Court in Morris v Rae, which now requires eviction (interference with the Buyer's right of ownership) or the threat of eviction by someone who has a better title (right) to the land.

Requirement for Judicial Eviction

Judicial Eviction in the Scots law definition, deriving from Roman law, is not the laymen sense of the word eviction, whereby a tenant is removed from the property of the landlord. Instead judicial eviction is where the true owner of the property asserts their right of ownership. An action of eviction must be raised in the court by the true Owner of the land and cannot be raised by the Buyer or by the Buyer raising a declarator (i.e.: a legal action requesting the Court to make a legal finding in a matter). If the Keeper of the Registers of Scotland exercises her power of rectification of the Land Register, this is also presumed to be considered a judicial eviction for the purposes of warrandice. In effect the warrant of good title is reduced to a warrant against eviction.

=== Supersession of Disposition Warrandice over Missives Warrandice ===
Typically, the delivery of a disposition will supersede the warranties given by the Seller under the contract in the Missives of Sale. However, there are three scenarios where the Warrandice of Missives of Sale continue to be relevant:

1) Delayed settlement - Without the disposition being issued, the Buyer can only rely on the warrandice in the missives of sale.

2) Abandoned transaction following Missives of Sale - After the missives of sale, if the transaction is abandoned (i.e.: no disposition issued), the Buyer is still able to use the Missives of Sale

3) Contractual clause in Missives preventing non-supersession of the warrandice.

Remedy

The only remedy for enforcement of warrandice of a disposition is damages. If the breach is that the Seller has no right of ownership to all or part of the subjects conveyed, damages are calculated by reference to the current value of the land, without regard to whether that value is greater or smaller than the original price. If the breach is that the title is encumbered by a real right or a real condition, the normal basis of damages is the resultant difference in market value that the real condition/real right has on the property value.
