= Missives of Sale (Scots law) =

Scottish trading law

The missives of sale, in Scots property law, are a series of formal letters between the two parties, the Buyer and the Seller, containing the contract of sale for the transfer of corporeal heritable property (land) in Scotland. The term 'land' in this article includes buildings and other structures upon land.

Example missives are available to view on the Law Society of Scotland and Property Standardisation Group websites.

The missives of sale form the first of three stages required to validly transfer ownership of land in Scotland. The three stages are:

1. The Contractual Stage (The Missives of Sale)
2. The Conveyancing Stage
3. The Registration Stage

== Principles of the contract and conveyance stages ==
=== Traditio legal system ===
The contractual stage or missives of sale only create binding personal obligations (and their respective personal rights) which are enforceable under the law of obligations (Scottish contract law). These obligations are usually among other things, an obligation on the Seller to grant a disposition transferring ownership and an obligation for the Buyer to pay the purchase price and an obligation for the Buyer to take delivery of the granted disposition.

The obligations under a contract are personal rights, rights in personam, so the contract alone does not create or transfer the real right of ownership in itself. This is because Scots law follows the principle that traditionibus non nudis pactis dominia rerum transferuntur: ownership is transferred by delivery (or other conveyance) and not by bare contract.

=== Abstract legal system ===
Only a conveyance, as a separate legal act, can effect the transfer agreed to under the contract between the parties. As well as being a traditio system, Scots law also uses the principle of 'abstraction', meaning the conveyance does rely on the cause of the transfer.

In Scots law the recognised causa for transfers of land are:

- Contract
- Gift
- Exchange of land (called a Contract of Excambion)
- Transfer in trust, expressly or otherwise

The validity of the conveyance (the transfer of property) does not depend on the validity of the cause of the transfer as Viscount Stair describes:

"We do not follow that subtility of annulling deeds, because they are sine causa… and therefore narratives expressing the cause of the disposition, are never inquired into, because, though there were no cause, the disposition is good.’

Therefore, Scotland differs from common-law jurisdictions such as England & Wales by requiring a conveyance stage as well as the formation of a contract. While a conveyance may be valid irrespective of the contract, the reasons for the contract's invalidity may also extend to invalidate the conveyance as a vitium reale. This can arise in certain cases of fraud or where the Seller lacks capacity.

== Stage one of voluntary transfer of land: the missives of sale ==
The first stage of a voluntary transfer of land, as described above, is typically contractual in nature, where parties negotiate the formal contract of sale between the owner (the Seller) and the Buyer. In Scots law, this contract is known as the missives of sale and typically are a series of formal letters with each parties offers and qualifications (containing conditions needed to be complied by either party). With the corporeal heritable property, the nature of its property's usage will reflect on the missives of sale, especially where the property is residential or commercial property.

=== Requirements of written contract ===
Under the Requirements of Writing (Scotland) Act 1995, a written document is required for the creation of a contract for transfer, variation or extinction of a real right in land. As ownership is a real right, a written contract is required. Unlike common contracts, which form one single document, the contract is laid out across multiple letters, the missives. The missives of sale can be considered a valid written contract because the buyer has made an offer in one document and the seller has accepted in another.

A person cannot make a contract orally or by any other means in relation to the sale of heritable property, other than by writings subscribed by the granter (i.e.: the Seller in the missives of sale) or through the use of electronic documents compliant with section 9B of the 1995 Act.

=== Electronic documents ===
A contract is capable of being formed by electronic documents, such as by e-mail, if they are validly executed under s.9B of the Requirements of Writing (Scotland) Act 1995. This electronic document must be authenticated by the party sending it (i.e.: the Buyer/Seller) and meet any requirements made by the Scottish Ministers, the legal name for the Scottish Government. Authenticated means:

"Requirements of Writing (Scotland) Act 1995 Section 9B

(2) An electronic document is authenticated by a person if the electronic signature of that person—

(a) is incorporated into, or logically associated with, the electronic document,

(b) was created by the person by whom it purports to have been created, and

(c) is of such type, and satisfies such requirements (if any), as may be prescribed by the Scottish Ministers in regulations."

The Scottish Government has introduced regulations for electronic documents under the Electronic Documents (Scotland) Regulations 2014 (SSI 2014/83). Under the 2014 Regulations, only an "advanced electronic signature" is capable of being an electronic signature, which requires "sophisticated technology" and must comply with the Electronic Signature Regulations 2002. Solicitors in Scotland have access to advanced electronic signature technology through their Law Society of Scotland smartcard so can execute these documents on their client's behalf.

== Formation of missives of sale ==
In Scots law, a contract is created when an offer from one party is accepted by another party (sometimes coined as 'offer + acceptance = contract'). However, as discussed above, this contract must be done in writing where it involves the transfer of ownership under the Requirements of Writing (Scotland) Act 1995.

=== Conditional offers ===
A Buyer will often include conditions that have to be met in his offer in the missives. In residential property, this is usually done by incorporating the Scottish Standard Clauses (see below) into the offer, which includes such conditions such as having sight of reports on the property or the inclusion of any moveable property (such as white goods) in the sale of the property. Such conditions may be suspensive, which will prevent the creation of a legally binding contract until the conditions are complied with.

=== Qualified acceptance ===
A Seller of property can accept the Buyer's offer to buy outright as a de plano acceptance. However, it is usually common practice to qualify an acceptance by the making of further conditions. Where a seller makes a qualified acceptance, Scots law treats this as new offer, an offer to sell, which the Buyer must then accept de plano or issue a new offer to buy with further or amended conditions; the offer to buy is effectively 'destroyed' by the qualified acceptance or offer to sell and cannot be relied upon by the Seller. This creates a 'ping pong' effect of a series of offers to sell/offers to purchase between the two parties, also termed missives, with no formally agreed contract until one party accepts the other's offer de plano. The final offer and de plano acceptance letters form the contract of sale in Scots law, hence the contract being called the missives (i.e.: letters) of sale.

=== Time limits ===
It is possible to qualify an offer to buy/qualified acceptance with a time limits for acceptance where wording is clearly used for the other party to identify the deadline. However, a new counter-offer made within the time limit will 'destroy' the qualified acceptance time limit. Where no time limit is made, the offer or counter-offer will cease for acceptance after the passage of a reasonable time.

=== The postal rule ===
When a party accepts the other parties' offer to purchase/offer to sell de plano, it is effective to create a binding contract from the moment it is posted or sent to a document exchange irretrievably (such as DX) not when it is received by the other party. This is due to the application of the doctrine known as the Postal Acceptance Rule in Scots law.

==== Abolition of the postal acceptance rule ====
The Scottish Law Commission has published a report in 2018 (Report on Review of Contract Law: Formation, Interpretation, Remedies for Breach, and Penalty Clauses, SLC Report 252) recommending the abolition of the postal acceptance rule and its replacement with a new statutory regime, available to view in its draft form on the Scottish Law Commission website. At the time of writing, it remains to be seen whether this draft bill accompanying the report will be introduced into the Scottish Parliament.

=== Withdrawing an offer to buy/offer to sell ===
There is no requirement to withdraw an offer or qualified acceptance by formal writing under the Requirements of Writing (Scotland) Act 1995.

It is not possible in Scots law for a party to withdraw their own qualifications to an offer once these qualifications have been received by the other party, and then to send a new de plano acceptance to the other party's offer in an attempt to create a valid contract which could not have been concluded previously.

In MacMillan v Caldwell, Lord Kirkwood held that once one of the parties indicated he was no longer prepared to contract, the other party cannot create the contract by accepting de plano an existing offer. However, the onus will be on the party who made the offer to prove that timeous notice of withdrawal of the offer was communicated to the other party's agent before any valid acceptance de plano is made.

=== Prior communings rule and clauses ===
At common law, following Winston v Patrick, the delivery of a disposition supersedes any personal obligations in the contract, even if collateral in nature. The Contract (Scotland) Act 1997 altered this common law rule, so that the missives are no longer superseded by the disposition. However, many conveyancers still include the use of a 2-year supersession clause in the Missives of Sale to ensure that contractual obligations come to end after 2 years rather than by negative prescription under the Prescription and Limitation (Scotland) Act 1973. The use of this clause will apply to both Buyer's and Seller's obligations under the contract.

== Residential property ==
In cases of residential property, the Seller will place the property for sale on the market through an estate agent of solicitor firm.

=== Home report ===
Depending on the nature of the residential property, the Seller typically must obtain a home report (including a questionnaire and survey report) when placing the property on the market, excluding:

- Property for sale as part of a portfolio.
- Seasonal and holiday accommodation.
- Property for sale alongside or ancillary to non-residential property.
- Property used for both residential and non-residential use
- Property which is unoccupied and unsafe for occupation
- Property which has not been previously used as a house before.

=== Missives process in residential property transactions ===
The Seller may advertise the property on the market at a fixed price or use a blind-bidding system whereby multiple offerers silently bid against each other without knowledge of the other offeror's offered purchase price.

The offeror, if they wish to purchase the property, will submit a formal written offer through their solicitor to the Seller's agents to purchase the residential property. The offer will outline the bid price and any conditions to be complied with by the Seller, such as the Buyer having sight of reports on the property or the inclusion of any moveable property (such as white goods) in the sale of the property. Only moveable property that has acceded to the heritable property will be included in the transfer automatically.

The seller with place a closing date, the date on which the Seller decides to stop receiving offers. The Seller will then review the offers made by the prospective buyers and choose a preferred buyer and will respond to this preferred buyer's offer.

This response, called the acceptance, may accept the offer outright, known as a simple or de plano acceptance, resulting in a binding contract between the parties in Scots law. However, it is common for the Seller's initial response to be a qualified acceptance in order to avoid creating a binding missives of sale at an early stage. Without a de plano acceptance outright to either parties' terms, there is no binding contract.

==== Missives in newly built homes ====
Missives in newly built homes are typically offered by the Builder at a fixed price under a standard-form Offer to Sell issued by the Seller. The terms and conditions of the offer will be non-negotiable and the Buyer should receive legal advice before signing the document, as this is acceptance de plano results in a legally enforceable contract in Scotland.

=== The Scottish standard clauses ===
Because of the individualistic nature of offers of sale/offers to purchase, largely because of the discrete natures of residential properties, the system of missives in residential property became liable to complexity. Over time, standard styles (templates) became used in localities and across Sheriffdoms in an effort to simplify the missives stage. The Law Society of Scotland's Property Committee has built on this work which culminated with the publication of the Scottish Standard Clauses.

These are available to view online alongside public guidance on the Law Society of Scotland Website. Today, the Scottish Standard Clauses have effectively become the "national Conditions of Sale" despite its recent completion in December 2014, and commencement of usage on 5 January 2015.

The Scottish Standard Clauses are registered as a public document in the Books of Council and Session for all solicitors in Scotland to incorporate them into the missives of sale to simplify the process. However, there is nothing to preclude a solicitor from using their own drafting in the missives of sale of property.

== Commercial property missives of sale ==
Commercial Property transactions may involve planning permissions and other legal requirements under planning law prior to the usage of land as a commercial property. As such, the missives of commercial property may have numerous conditions and complex terms, leading to a large amount of contractual negotiations.

The Property Standardisation Group was formed by four law firms, CMS (formerly known as Dundas & Wilson), Dentons (formerly known as Maclay Murray & Spens), Pinsent Masons (formerly known as McGrigors), and Shepherd and Wedderburn in 2001 in a combined effort to produce common agreed styles (templates) for transactions of commercial heritable property in Scotland. These templates are available to view on the Property Standardisation Group website.

Commercial transactions usually operate by the sharing of a draft agreement between the parties agents, now commonly done online on secure cloud software where both parties' agents can amend the document or by e-mail exchange of draft documents between agents, until the agreement of a draft missives of sale. The parties, or their authorised agents, can then formally sign and bind the parties to the contract in line with the Requirements of Writing (Scotland) Act 1995.

== Property sold at auction (public roup) ==
Heritable property may also be sold at an auction, called a roup in Scots law. The Seller prepares a standard contract that is exhibited to the bidders in advance of the auction. The winning bidder at the roup, signs a minute of enactment and preference to bind himself to the pre-prepared contract and becomes the Buyer.

== Conclusion of missives ==
Once the parties contractual negotiations have concluded, a contract will be validly created where, as discussed above, a party makes a simple acceptance to another party's offer, which can incorporate acceptance to any previous qualified acceptances/offers conditions made. This point is known as the conclusion of missives and ends the contractual stage of the voluntary transfer of land.

The conclusion of missives typically takes a few weeks to occur due to the due diligence process that each party must undertake before the creation of a legally binding agreement. However, the parties only obtain a personal right under contract law when the missives conclude; i.e.: there is no contract until then. Following the conclusion of missives, the Buyer will only have a personal right against the Seller not a real right (right in rem).

However, the parties can move to the conveyancing stage. After conclusion, the missives, as an enforceable contract, may only be revoked by written discharge of the two parties. Should the parties wish to amend rather than discharge the current missives to enter into a new contract, they may apply to the Sheriff Court or Court of Session for a rectification order under Law Reform (Miscellaneous Provisions) (Scotland) Act 1985 section 8.

== Warrandice of Missives of Sale ==
A full and absolute warrandice (in other jurisdictions called a warranty) is implied by law in the missives of sale. This means that the Seller warrants (i.e.: guarantees) the following four warranties:

1. Absolute Good Title
2. No lesser real rights (i.e.: no liferent or security etc. in the land)
3. No unusual real conditions (i.e.: no unusual burdens or servitudes attached to the land)
4. No future acts will be made prejudicial to the Buyer's title (ownership) to the land.

In practice, these warranties are often expressly granted, which will vary or add to the implied warranties of the Seller, such as the use of the Scottish Standard Clauses. In the unlikely event that the missives are silent as to warranties, those implied by law will apply.

=== Warranty 1: absolute good title ===
The Seller warrants that he is able to convey ownership validly to the Buyer. The warrant also covers that the Seller's right of ownership (title) is absolutely good, and not voidable or excluded from the Keeper of the Register of Scotland's indemnity. Hume, the institutional writer, and source of law in Scotland, says the Seller must also furnish the Buyer with evidence that the title is good.

The warrant must cover the whole of the property transferred, i.e.: the Seller must own all of the land that is agreed to be transferred under the Missives of Sale. An example of this can be commonly found in case law where the Seller contracts to transfer the entire land, that is to say a coele usuque ad centrum (from the heavens to the centre of the Earth) but the mineral rights, found in the strata of the land as a separate conventional tenement, are not owned by the Seller but by a third party but would be warranted to be transferred to the Buyer.

In a breach of this warranty, the Buyer can rescind the Missives of Sale, ending the contract between the two parties. Following Holms v Ashford Estates Ltd, it is settled that a warrant that the land transferred is fit for the purpose the Buyer has informed the Seller it was to be used does not fall within this warranty.

=== Warranty 2: No lesser real rights ===
The Seller warrants that there are no lesser real rights held in the land that is to be transferred, excluding leases.

Leases have conflicting legal authority on whether they are covered by the Seller's no lesser real rights warranty. Older legal authorities from the 16th and 17th century Kingdom of Scotland courts appear to suggest that the implied warranty does not cover leases. The rationale for this was that historically, feudal owners would rarely occupy the land they owned, which was often leased or given to vassals through subinfeudation so a warranty that land has no lesser real rights was not relevant.

However, Hume, the institutional writer, and source of law in Scotland, wrote that only leases of a very long duration, at low rent, or where the lease gives the tenant large-ranging powers over the land, would be covered by this warranty.

The modern source of authority in this area is Lothian and Border Farmers Ltd v M'Cutcheon which followed the old authorities that a lease was not covered by warranty. However, there is academic criticism that this decision was incorrect, and remains a first instance judgment of the Outer House of the Court of Session.

In any event, conveyancers will often add a clause to the missives, as is done in the Scottish Standard Clauses, that the property will be provided to the seller for entry and vacant possession.

The occupancy rights of a spouse under the Matrimonial Homes (Family Protection) (Scotland) Act 1981 are akin to a statutory quasi-real right and it is uncertain whether this is included in the warranty. In any event, it is standard practice to include a term in the missives concerning occupancy rights, as is done in the Scottish Standard Clauses.

=== Warranty 3: No unusual real conditions ===
It was established definitively in 1835 that real conditions, such as servitudes and burdens, were covered by the absolute warranty made by the Seller. It is now implied in law that a Seller warrants that there are no real conditions on the property where:

1. that the condition was unknown to the Buyer at the time when the missives concluded;
2. that the condition is unusual either generally or in relation to the type and location of the property in question; and
3. that the condition results in a material diminution in the value of the property.

All three tests must be satisfied for a claim in warrandice to succeed against an unknown real condition.

In practice, due diligence checks by each parties' agents should identify any previously unknown real conditions prior to the conclusion of missives.When determining knowledge, the court will look at whether by the Buyer's "negligence and inexcusabill ignorance" (translated from Scots: negligence and inexcusable ignorance) prevented him from having actual knowledge, if it did the court may hold the Buyer had constructive knowledge, knowledge based on the exercise of reasonable care.

Therefore, a Buyer is deemed to know of and to expect real conditions of a standard type. If the Seller avers, i.e.: makes a factual submission to the court, that the Buyer knew of the condition at the date of the conclusion of missives, the Seller alone must prove this evidential onus.

Where the court finds that a Buyer acted with negligence and inexcusabill ignorance, thereby rejecting the warranty claim; parties who acted through a solicitor may alternatively be able to pursue a claim against the agent handling the sale for professional negligence.

=== Warrandice 4: No future acts will be made prejudicial to the Buyer's title to (ownership of) the land ===
The fourth warranty guarantees that the Seller will take no future acts that would prejudice the Buyer's contractual right to ownership. A Seller would breach their warranty where they grant a subsequent disposition to another individual or subsequently grant lesser real rights in the land to third parties after the Buyer has received their disposition. This warranty ceases to be relevant once ownership validly transfers to the Buyer, following the registration of the disposition.

== Remedies to breach of contract (missives of sale) ==
=== Breach of Warrandice of Missives of Sale ===
If a Buyer later discovers a latent defect in their title, it might prove impossible to trace the Seller or their predecessors following completion, or the date of entry, whereby the Buyer has paid the purchase price and the Seller has issued a disposition (this is usually done on the same day). As such the efficacy of warrandice as a legal remedy for Buyers later discovering latent defects in the property's title is limited. The point at which a warranty becomes enforceable is also of conflicting legal and academic opinion. Bell, the institutional writer, is of the opinion that:

"the buyer has an absolute right to a good title ... and unless he shall have unequivocally discharged this right, he is not bound ... to wait till his right is challenged. It is a sufficient ground of exception to the title if it be liable to challenge"

However, there are qualifications to the rule, such as a requirement that an action of ejection has been raised against the Buyer.

==== Requirement for judicial eviction ====
Contrary to wide belief by conveyancers, there is no requirement for ejection to enforce a warranty found in the Missives of Sale. Judicial Eviction in the Scots law definition, deriving from Roman law, is not the laymen sense of the word eviction, whereby a tenant is removed from the property of the landlord.

Instead, judicial eviction is where the true owner of the property asserts their right of ownership. An action of eviction must be raised in the court by the true Owner of the land and cannot be raised by the Buyer or by the Buyer raising a declarator (i.e.: a legal action requesting the Court to make a legal finding in a matter). If the Keeper of the Registers of Scotland exercises her power of rectification of the Land Register, this is also presumed to be considered a judicial eviction for the purposes of warrandice.

The requirements for judicial eviction or a serious threat of eviction by someone who has a superior title differs where the party relies on the warrandices in the disposition. The warrandice of a disposition has been given recent treatment by the Supreme Court in Morris v Rae, which now requires eviction (interference with the Buyer's right of ownership) or the threat of eviction by someone who has a better title (right) to the land.

==== Supersession of disposition warrandice over missives warrandice ====
Typically, the delivery of a disposition with warrandice will supersede the Missives of Sale's warrandice given by the Seller. However, there are three scenarios where the Warrandice of Missives of Sale continue to be relevant:

1) Delayed settlement - Without the disposition being issued, the Buyer can only rely on the warrandice in the missives of sale.

2) Abandoned transaction following Missives of Sale - After the missives of sale, if the transaction is abandoned (i.e.: no disposition issued), the Buyer is still able to use the Missives of Sale

3) Contractual clause in Missives expressly preventing non-supersession of the warrandice. Terms may also still be enforceable under the Contract (Scotland) Act 1997.

Remedy

Where the missives of sale warrandice have been breached and are still enforceable, see above, the Buyer can typically rescind the Missives (i.e.: terminate the contract) and/or seek remedies of (A) raise an action of specific implement and/or (b) claiming damages for breach of a personal obligation. However, if the warrant breached was a positive obligation of the Seller, commonly in Missives of Sale these are obligation to provide a disposition, the Seller is allowed a reasonable period to perform the obligation.

Rescission (i.e.: termination) of the Missives is only permitted following the conclusion of this reasonable period. If it transpires that the Seller has no ownership of the land at all (i.e.: neither ownership of the land, a legal or conventional separate tenement) then this would be considered irremediable and rescission is available to the Buyer immediately. If a breach occurs in which rescission is not available, i.e.: there is no positive obligation on the Seller to enforce, then there is no availability of damages.

However, in practice, a remedy for damages without rescinding the Missives is provided for in the terms of the Missives of Sale itself, this contractual provision follows the Roman law contractual remedy, the actio quanti minoris, which allows claims that where there has been a breach of contract by the seller, the Buyer is entitled to retain the property and claim damages based on a diminution in the value of the property.

== Statutory personal bar ==
A statutory personal bar exists in Scots law in relation to written contracts, similar to the concept of esoppel in other jurisdictions. This protection allows an otherwise invalid contract to be held valid and enforceable where parties have acted in reliance of the contract with material (financial or otherwise) consequences. Under the Requirements of Writing (Scotland) Act 1995, section 1(3) and 1(4) provides that:

"Requirements of Writing (Scotland) Act 1995

Section 1(3)

Where a contract, obligation or trust mentioned in subsection (2)(a) [list of situations where writings are requiredl] above is not constituted in a document complying with section 2 [written document] or, as the case may be, section 9B [electronic documents] of this Act, but one of the parties to the contract, a creditor in the obligation or a beneficiary under the trust (“the first person”) has acted or refrained from acting in reliance on the contract, obligation or trust with the knowledge and acquiescence of the other party to the contract, the debtor in the obligation or the truster (“the second person”)— (a)the second person shall not be entitled to withdraw from the contract, obligation or trust; and

(b)the contract, obligation or trust shall not be regarded as invalid,

on the ground that it is not so constituted, if the condition set out in subsection (4) below is satisfied.

Section 1(4)

(4)The condition referred to in subsection (3) above is that the position of the first person—

(a)as a result of acting or refraining from acting as mentioned in that subsection has been affected to a material extent; and

(b)as a result of such a withdrawal as is mentioned in that subsection would be adversely affected to a material extent."[brackets and underlines added]

This means where the missives of sale were not created in compliance to the 1995 Act, such as by informal writings or oral agreement, can still be enforceable against a person where the other party has:

1. Has acted or refrained from acting in reliance on the contract, (e.g.: second party is the seller who has made an offer to purchase a house because he believed his house to be sold, the second party is the buyer who has made arrangements to leave her current property)
2. the second person knew of the party's actions, (e.g.: the second person (Buyer) was told that the person (Seller) was going to purchase another house, the second person (Buyer) told the person (Seller) that she was going to make arrangements to leave property)
3. The second person acquiesced to this acting or refraining from acting, (e.g.: the second person (Buyer) did not object to the Seller making a purchase another house, the second person (Seller) did not object to the Buyer quitting her current property and ceasing searching for another property)
4. as a result of the acting or refraining from acting, the first person has been affected to a material extent. (e.g.: the first person (Seller) has now entered into a contract of sale, the first person (Buyer) has incurred cancellation costs and other fees)

The first party then has to prove that if the second party does withdraw from the invalid contract, the first party would be adversely affected to a material extent. As always in Scots civil law, the first person must prove the above statutory burden of proof on the balance of probabilities that it occurred.
