= Specificatio (Roman law) =

Specificatio is a legal concept adopted from Roman law. It is an original mode of acquisition, since it involves deriving rights over objects that are not subject to pre-existing rights of ownership. This may be compared with the original modes of acquisition, and other derivative modes of acquisition, such as accession. Specificatio occurs where new property rights are established as a result of some action upon objects – owned by someone else – that results in a change of species. Essentially, this meant the creation of a new thing out of the materials of another. For instance, if one has made wine, oil, or corn out of the grapes, olives, or ears of corn belonging to another.

== Roman law ==
In Roman law, specificatio referred to the acquisition of a new species arising from a change of species.

=== When was a nova species created? ===
A nova species was created when the new thing had a new identity or name. Nicholas rationalises this rule by reference to the rei vindicatio which requires the vindicator to name the subject of the rei vindicatio. The rights over the old items became extinguished if one could not name the item and have the iudex recognise it in the thing.

The tests mentioned by Thomas are:

1. If a thing belongs in a different commercial category, e.g. marble blocks and marble statues
2. If the materials were still recognisable as what they had been.

=== Ownership of the nova species ===
==== The position in the Institutes of Gaius ====
In the Institutes of Gaius, Gaius refers to a number of examples where this process occurs, and cites two conflicting schools of thought on the question of ownership.

1. Sabinus/Cassus - the manufactured article should be held to belong to the owner of the material substance.
2. Proculians - the manufactured article should be held to belong to the creator of the article.

Nicholas and Thomas consider the philosophical background of the two doctrines. The Stoic view gave primacy to matter, whilst Aristotle considered that form or essence was what mattered most. Nicholas considers that the Aristotelian form faces the same difficulty of definition as 'identity'. Andrew Borkowski considers that the Proculians treated specificatio as a form of occupatio. At the moment of its creation, a nova species was regarded as a res nullius open to the first occupier, and for that reason it should be held to belong to the creator.

==== The position in the Institutes of Justinian ====
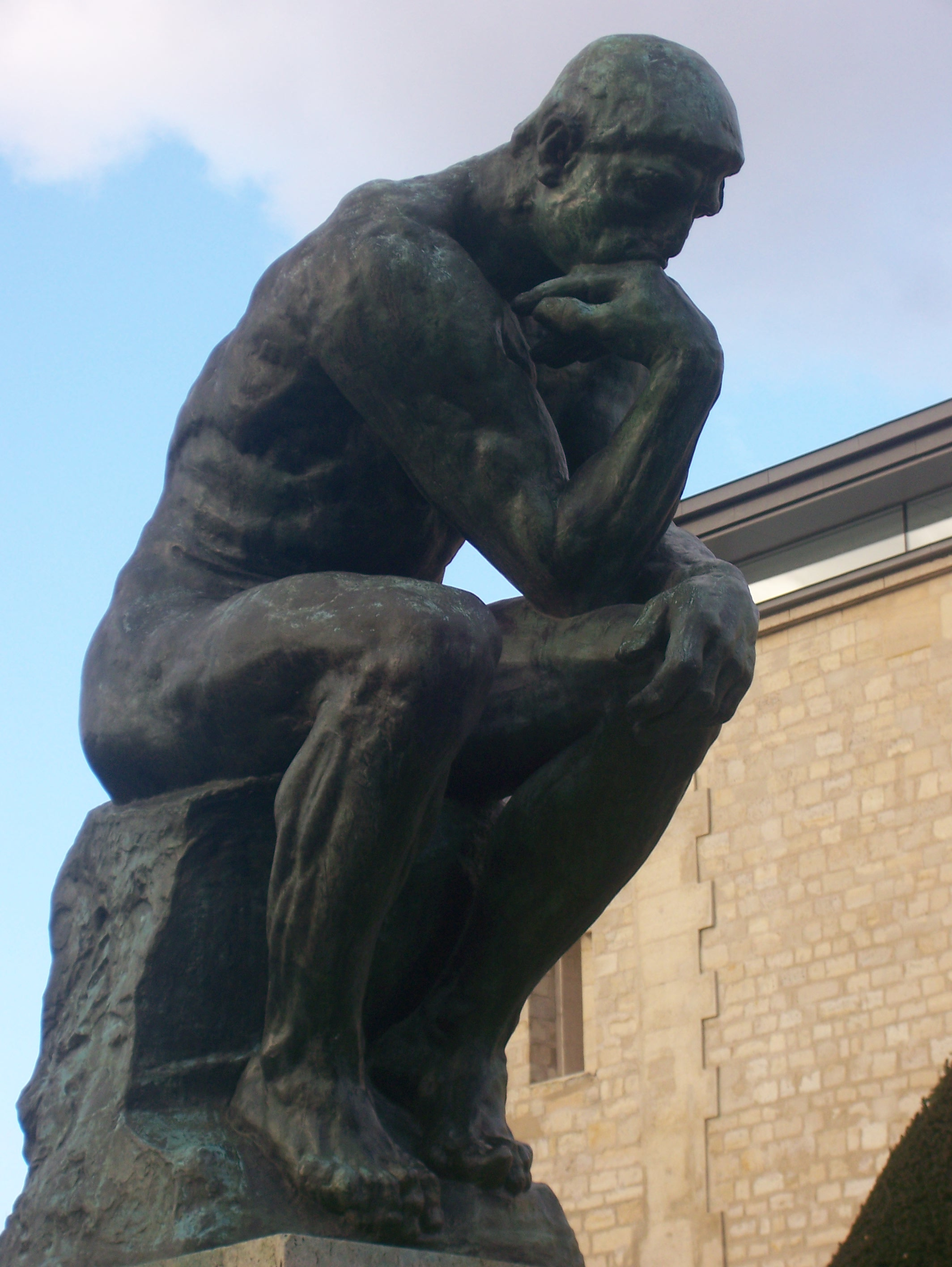
The Thinker (bronze)

The solution in Justinian's Institutes was a compromise measure, known as the media sententia (or middle way). The owner of the raw materials or substance would own the nova species where the nova species could be reduced to its former component parts or raw materials without excessive difficulty or expense. If the nova species was irreducible, it was held to belong to the creator. Where the creator contributed any substance, then the maker owned it as he would have contributed both parts and labour.The issue of good faith (bona fides) was irrelevant to ownership, only to compensation.

In issues relating to res furtiva (Stolen Goods) acquired by specificatio, these goods cannot be claimed in a suit for their recovery as they have become part of the new thing. However, the disposessed can still bring an action for theft (actio furti) and a personal action (condictio).

Commentary on the media sententia
Nicholas criticises the media sententia as it did not take into account the relative importance of the materials and the maker's skill. Borkowski suggests that the test was not feasible if there was nothing left of the original material, e.g. if the creator chipped away at bronze to make a statue. The French and German civil codes take such considerations into account, e.g. the French system gives the nova species to the owner of the substance unless the work exceeds the materials, and the Germans reverse this balance. In both cases, compensation must be made to the party who loses out.

The classic example of the reducibility test failing is where there is a bronze statue and a marble statue.

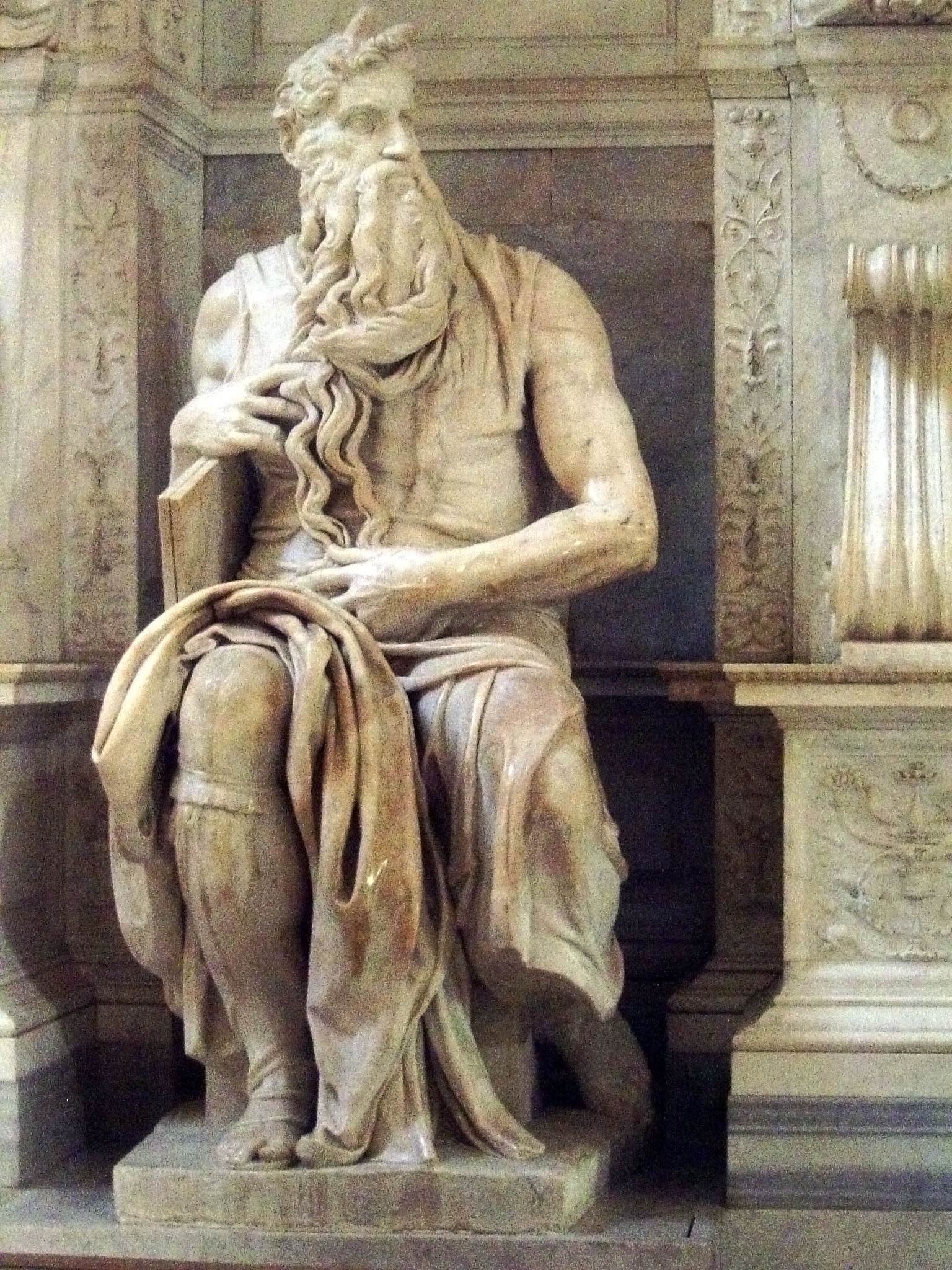
Moses (marble)

==== Compensation ====
According to both Nicholas and Thomas, the general principles were the same as those for accessio. In relation to the material owner, possession would grant the exceptio doli mali until the costs of materials were paid, whilst theft would grant an action of theft and a condictio furtiva. In relation to the creator who does not own through specificatio, possession would grant an exceptio to the rei vindicatio.
