= Acquisition of sovereignty =

Concept in international law related to territory

A number of methods of acquisition of sovereignty are or have been recognised by international law as lawful methods by which a state may acquire sovereignty over territory. International law adopts much of Roman property law in regards to acquisition of sovereignty due to the underlying European civil law at the time of early discovery voyages such as Christopher Columbus. The basis of acquisition of states ownership of vacant territory therefore continues to apply, (and was often applied historically to land already possessed by indigenous populations).

== Accretion ==
Accretion refers to the physical expansion of an existing territory through geological processes, such as alluvion (the deposit of sediment) or vulcanism.

== Cession ==
A state may acquire sovereignty over territory if that sovereignty is ceded (transferred) to it by another state. Cession is typically effected by treaty. Examples of cession include the cession of Hong Kong Island and Kowloon, purchases such as the Louisiana Purchase and the Alaska Purchase, and cessions involving multiple parties such as the Treaty on the Final Settlement with Respect to Germany.

== Conquest ==
Direct annexation, the acquisition of territory by way of force, was historically recognized as a lawful method for gaining sovereignty over newly acquired territory. By the end of World War II, however, invasion and annexation ceased to be recognized by international law and were no longer accepted as a means of territorial acquisition. The Convention respecting the Laws and Customs of War on Land (Hague IV, 1907) contains explicit provisions concerning the protection of civilians and their property in occupied territories. The United Nations Charter also has related provisions regarding territorial integrity.

In the case of United States v. Huckabee (1872), the United States Supreme Court, speaking through Justice Nathan Clifford, said: "Power to acquire territory either by conquest or treaty is vested by the Constitution in the United States. Conquered territory, however, is usually held as a mere military occupation until the fate of the nation from which it is conquered is determined ... ".

== Effective occupation ==
Effective occupation is the control of free newly discovered territory exercised by a power with no sovereign title to the land, whether in defiance or absence of a proper sovereign. Several cases in international law have dealt with what "effective occupation" entails.

In the words of the Eritrea/Yemen Arbitration Award:

The modern international law of the acquisition (or attribution) of territory generally requires that there be: an intentional display of power and authority over the territory, by the exercise of jurisdiction and state functions, on a continuous and peaceful basis.

Also in the case of Mexico and France over Clipperton Island:

By immemorial usage having the force of law, besides the animus occupandi, the actual, and not the nominal, taking of possession is a necessary condition of occupation. This taking of possession consists in the act, or series of acts, by which the occupying state reduces to its possession the territory in question and takes steps to exercise exclusive authority there.

In the case of the Netherlands and the United States in the Island of Palmas case, the arbitrator ruled:

The title of discovery, if it had not been already disposed of by the Treaties of Münster and Utrecht would, under the most favourable and most extensive interpretation, exist only as an inchoate title, as a claim to establish sovereignty by effective occupation. An inchoate title however cannot prevail over a definite title founded on continuous and peaceful display of sovereignty.

== Prescription ==
Prescription is related to occupation, and refers to the acquisition of sovereignty by way of the actual exercise of sovereignty, maintained for a reasonable period of time, that is effected without objection from other states and countries.

== Other readings ==
- The Acquisition of Territory in International Law
