= Alluvion =

Method of legal land acquisition

Alluvion, is a Roman law method of acquisition of heritable property (land). The typical cause is sediment (alluvium) deposited by a river. This sediment, legally termed the accessory, accreses (i.e., merges with) a piece of land, the principal (operating a subtype of the Roman mode of acquisition by accession) and thus accedes to the ownership of the principal land over time.

It continues to have relevance in the modern age from adopting Roman property law by modern legal systems, primarily civil law jurisdictions. Scots law is a notable example of the usage of alluvion within the law of accession (accesio). Public international law also recognises the acquisition of sovereignty of virgin territory by operation of nature, such as sediment deposits, again following the Roman law principles of alluvion.

== See also ==
- Alluvial fan
- Alluvial plain
- Accession (Scots law)
