= Accessio (Roman law) =

Accessio is a concept from Roman property law for acquiring ownership of property (the accessory) which is merged, or acceded to, another piece of property (the principal). Generally, the owner of the principal, whatever it may be, also became the owner of the accessory. Its usage continues in modern times in legal systems around the world incorporating Roman property law, primarily civilian legal systems.

Accessio was not a specific rule of original acquisition of property in itself; instead, it served as the principle underlying the modes of acquisition that had their own particular guidelines for determination of ownership.

== Roman accession ==
Accession might also be (from Latin accedere, to go to, approach), in law, a method of acquiring property adopted from Roman law, by which, in things that have a close connection with or dependence on one another, the property of the principal draws after it the property of the accessory, according to the principle, accessio cedet principali.

Accession may take place either in a natural way, such as the growth of fruit or the pregnancy of animals, or in an artificial way. The various methods may be classified as:

- Land to land by accretion or alluvion
- Movables to land or fixtures
- Movables to movables
- Movables added to by the art or industry of man

=== Accession in relation to land ===
The general principle was that everything acceded to the land since the land was the principal.

==== Buildings (inaedificatio) ====
Ownership of the house was considered distinct from ownership of the materials used to make the house. Owners of the materials were permitted to vindicate the materials upon demolition of the house, but the demolition of the house was forbidden by the Twelve Tables.

Where X built on X's land using Y's materials, X owned the house since it acceded to X's land. Y would be capable of laying one of two actions if X was in good faith (bona fides) in using Y's materials, but two actions if X was in bad faith (mala fides). These actions were (i) the rei vindicatio for the materials and (ii) the actio de tigno, which would recoup twice the value of the materials. Additionally, Y would also have an action against a third party if that third party stole the materials.

In A Text-Book of Roman Law from Augustus to Justinian, W. W. Buckland discusses a third situation where X builds on Y's land using Z's materials. In such a situation, Buckland suggests that in relation to Y, X should be treated as though an XYX situation has occurred, and in relation to Z, as though an XXZ situation has occurred.

==== Plants and seeds ====
X's plants (implantatio) and seeds (satio) acceded irreversibly to Y's soil once they have taken root, but Y must pay expenses if X is in legal possession, since X will have the exceptio dolus malus against Y's rei vindicatio.

==== Rivers and new islands ====
- Alluvion
- Avulsion

=== Accession in relation to movables ===
The accessory accedes to the principal. The debate is generally over which is the principal and which is the accessory. The principal owner owns regardless of good faith, bad faith, or consent. Possible tests that could be adopted in deciding this question include:

- Economic value
- Size
- Physical identity
- Relative non-economic value in terms of aesthetic value or labor

In Roman law, there was no consistency. Everything was decided on a casuistic basis. The Physical Identity test was the dominant test, i.e., the principal is that which gives its name to the final product and the accessory is that which has its identity merged and lost in the identity of the other. However, there are a number of special cases with special, and rather idiosyncratic rules, which are as follows:

- Writing (scriptura) and painting (pictura)
- Threads and garments (textura)
- Confusion of goods (confusio) and commixture (commixtio)

== Modern law ==
Accessio has continued relevance in present times, partly due to the adoption of Roman law principles by legal systems across Europe, Africa, Asia and South America, primarily civilian legal systems.

=== Domestic legal systems ===
Legal systems across the modern world continue to employ a form of accessio. A full discussion of each legal system falls outside the scope of this article, but see specifically: South African property law, civilian property law, Scots law. Modern legal systems go further when describing accession, including all circumstances where property has been increased physically but the Roman law concept relates to merger of an accessory and principal alone. Further reading on contemporary usage of accesio in modern states can be found in (L. van Vliet, ‘Accession of Movables to Land’ (2002) 6 Edin LR 67).

== See also ==
- Accession (property law)
- Quicquid plantatur solo, solo cedit
