= Chelsea Yacht and Boat Club v Pope =

English legal case regarding property law and houseboats

Chelsea Yacht & Boat Company v Pope
- Court: Court of Appeal
- Full case name: Chelsea Yacht & Boat Company Limited v Justin Pope
- Citation: [2000] EWCA Civ 425

Case history
- Prior actions: Appellant lost in the West London County Court before HHJ Cotran (case leapfrog-appealed)

Court membership
- Judges sitting: Tuckey LJ; Waller LJ; Morritt LJ

Keywords
- Co-ownership

Chelsea Yacht and Boat Company v Pope [2001] 2 All ER 409 is an English legal case. The case established that a houseboat cannot form part of the land (real property) as the degree of annexation is insufficient. Secondly the court held that as a result a rented houseboat to an occupier is not a dwelling house, under Part One of the Housing Act 1988 and is a chattel of its owner. The licence to occupy can be revoked, whether instantly or on reasonable notice, rather than under the more lengthy possession proceedings of the law of residential tenancies.

The court applied the test of the most senior court in Elitestone Limited v Morris [1997] which found positively in favour of a chalet being annexed as part of the land.

== Facts ==
Pope rented since 1993 a houseboat where he lived north of Battersea Bridge on the left bank, aground for half of the time due to its position and the tide (on the Tideway). The owner brought possession proceedings under the Housing Act 1998; the preliminary legal question was whether this was the correct procedure as if it were not a "dwelling" it would instead be a "chattel" so possession could be more quickly got back by the landlord.

== Decision ==
The case established that a houseboat does not form part of the land which is not in common ownership (such as through adverse possession of the river bed) as the degree of annexation is insufficient.

Tuckey LJ gave the lead judgment:

...The principles by which to test whether a chattel has become part of the land have recently been considered by the House of Lords in Elitestone Limited v Morris [1997] 1 WLR 687. In that case the question was whether a chalet resting only by its own weight on concrete pillars set into the ground had become part of the land. The chalet was connected to the usual services. It could not be taken down and reerected elsewhere; it could only be removed by demolition. The House restored the assistant recorder's conclusion that it was part of the land. The head note says:

"The answer to the question whether a structure became part and parcel of the land itself depended on the degree and the object of annexation to the land; that, assessed objectively, a house built in such a way that it could not be removed except by destruction could not have been intended to remain a chattel and must have been intended to form part of the realty."

...Ms Easty...on behalf of Mr Pope referred to a number of other cases under different legislation. First, she referred to rating cases where the Court had to consider whether the occupiers of a hulk Cory v Bristow [1877]... a landing stage, Forrest v Overseers of Greenwich [1858]...; and the Hispaniola Westminister City Council v Woodbury [1991]..., all in the Thames were in rateable occupation of land. But these cases only illustrate the circumstances in which under the intricacies of rating law a chattel becomes rateable if it occupies land or is enjoyed with land. They shed no light on the circumstances in which a chattel becomes part of the land and therefore I do not find them of assistance in this case. The same applies to the poll tax case of Stubbs v Hartnell' [1997]...which concerned a houseboat in the Thames.

...

Turning then to the object or purpose of annexure, Miss Easty strongly submits that the attachment of the houseboat was to provide a permanent home for its occupant. I do not agree. It is not necessary to annex the houseboat to the land to enable it to be used as a home. The attachments were, like the ship's anchor referred to by Blackburn J, to prevent the houseboat from being carried by the tide or the weather up or down stream and to provide the services to it.

For these reasons I conclude that the houseboat has not become part of the land. I support this conclusion on the grounds of common sense. It is common sense that a house built on land is part of the land. (See Lord Lloyd in Elitestone...). So too it is common sense that a boat on a river is not part of the land. A boat, albeit one used as a home, is not of the same genus as real property.

Waller LJ agreed giving no opinion.

Morritt LJ gave his own concurring opinion.

As the three judges agreed, Chelsea Yacht and Boat Club could recover their asset as a licence to occupy which expired, not waiting among other things for 28 days to pass from falling into arrears, nor did the law require a notice to be served. No notice to quit "was strictly required".

== See also ==
- English land law
- English property law
