= Quicquid plantatur solo, solo cedit =

Legal Latin principle

Quicquid plantatur solo, solo cedit (Latin, "whatever is affixed to the soil belongs to the soil") is a legal Latin principle related to fixtures which means that something that is or becomes affixed to the land becomes part of the land; therefore, title to the fixture is a part of the land and passes with title to the land. Consequently, whosoever owns that piece of land will also own the things attached.

Another way to look at it is by interpreting the Latin principle as 'that which is attached to the land becomes a part of the land'; use of the word soil is a more literal translation.

The purpose of the principle is to ensure that a purchaser of land does not acquire title or ownership of something which is not intended to pass with the land. The principle also ensures that correct title does pass to a purchaser in case a previous owner attempts to assert that a fixture was a chattel and therefore belonged to them.

The principle has particular relevance to landlord and tenant law. If a tenant is coming close to the end of their agreement and aims to remove a particular item attached to the landlord's property, the principle exists to remedy this.

== See also ==
- Accessio
