= Fixture (property law) =

Legal concept; physical property which is permanently attached to real property

A bathroom sink fixture out of order

A fixture, as a legal concept, means any physical property that is permanently attached (fixed) to real property (usually land). Property not affixed to real property is considered chattel property. Fixtures are treated as a part of real property, particularly in the case of a security interest. A classic example of a fixture is a building, which, in the absence of language to the contrary in a contract of sale, is considered part of the land itself and not a separate piece of property. Generally speaking, the test for deciding whether an article is a fixture or a chattel turns on the purpose of attachment. If the purpose was to enhance the land, the article is likely a fixture; if the article was affixed to enhance the use of the chattel itself, the article is likely a chattel.

Chattel property is converted into a fixture by the process of attachment. For example, if a piece of lumber sits in a lumber yard, it is a chattel. If the same lumber is used to build a fence on the land, it becomes a fixture to that real property. In many cases, the determination of whether property is a fixture or a chattel turns on the degree to which the property is attached to the land. For example, this problem arises in the case of a trailer home. In this case, the characterization of the home as chattel or realty will depend on how permanently it is attached, such as whether the trailer has a foundation.

The characterization of property as a fixture or as chattel is important. In most jurisdictions, the law respecting the registration of security against debt, or proof that money has been lent on the collateral of property, is different for chattels than it is for real property. For example, in the province of Ontario, Canada, mortgages against real property must be registered in the county or region's land titles office. However, mortgages against chattels must be registered in the province-wide registry set up under the Personal Property Security Act.

In the case of a trailer home, whether it is a fixture or chattel has a bearing on whether a real property mortgage applies to the trailer. For example, most mortgages contain a clause that forbids the borrower from removing or demolishing fixtures on the property, which would lower the value of the security. However, there have been cases where lenders lend money based on the value of the trailer home on the property, where that trailer is later removed from the property. Similarly, a chattel mortgage granted to allow a person to purchase a trailer home could be lost if the trailer is later attached to real property.

The law regarding fixtures can also cause many problems with property held under a lease. Fixtures put in place by the tenant belong to the landlord if the tenant is evicted from the property. This is the case even if the fixture could have legally been removed by the tenant while the lease was in good standing. For example, a chandelier hung by the tenant may become the property of the landlord. Although this example is trivial, there have been cases where heavy equipment incorporated into a plant has been deemed to have become fixtures even though it was sold as chattels.

Because the value of fixtures often exceeds the value of the land they are affixed to, lawsuits to determine whether a particular item is a chattel or a fixture are common. In one case in Canada, a provincial government argued that a huge earth dam was a chattel, as it was only held in place by gravity and not by any type of affixation (the claim was rejected). In a sale of land, fixtures are treated as part of the land, and may not be removed or altered by the seller prior to the transfer of the land.

Fixtures are known in civil law as essential parts.

== Trade fixtures ==
An important exception to the usual treatment of fixtures is the category of trade fixtures (often called "chattel" fixtures), chattels installed by a tenant on leased commercial property specifically for their use in a trade or business. These may always be removed by the tenant, so long as any damage to the structure caused by the removal is repaid or repaired. For example, business signage, display counters, store shelves, liquor bars, and machining equipment are often firmly, if not almost permanently, attached to the building or land. However, they remain personal property and can be removed by the tenant, since they are part of the tenant's business.

The economic logic behind this exception for trade fixtures reckons that if tenants could not remove them, then landlords would bear the responsibility of outfitting their tenants with such equipment and materials.

By deduction, therefore, a trade fixture is not a fixture at all. Its name is misleading, since a fixture, by definition, is real property that must remain with the real estate when a seller sells it or a tenant leaves her lease. A trade "fixture" is not real property, but personal property of the tenant.

The landlord does have some protection. Any damage to the real property caused by the tenant's removal of trade fixtures must be repaired or paid for by the tenant. If a trade fixture is not removed when the tenant moves out, those trade fixtures become the landlord's property through the process of accession. For example, if a restaurant goes bankrupt and the owner forgoes his right and the expense of removing all the kitchen equipment, dining booths and other trade fixtures, those trade fixtures become the landlord's property. In this manner, they will no longer be trade fixtures and can actually become regular fixtures, hence real property.

== Law in Australia ==
In the absence of agreement between the parties, the doctrine of fixtures, subject to statute, operates to resolve contests concerning title to objects.

Whether a chattel by its nature, becomes a fixture by virtue of all the circumstances, surrounding their annexation to land, depends upon (i) the purpose and (ii) degree of annexation. Semble, it is a mixed question of fact and law, to be determined objectively, the subjective intention being a consideration.

=== Intention of annexation ===
Intention may be ascertained from the annexing party's relation to the land's possessor, when the chattel's use is contemplated, not from the party's agreement. Objects brought onto land by tenants may become fixtures, and this fact may be a significant determining factor.

=== Purpose of annexation ===
Since Palumberi v Palumberi, greater emphasis has been directed to the purpose of annexation. Each case depends upon its own facts, however a guiding test, is whether a chattel has been fixed with the intention that it shall remain in position 'permanently or for an indefinite or substantial period', or only for some temporary purpose.

=== Degree of annexation ===
Where the object is not resting by its own weight, this will raise the rebuttable presumption, that the chattel is a fixture. Non-affixed objects may become fixtures especially when they will be used for an extensive period.

Further indicators include whether the object can be detached without substantial damage being caused, whether it was fixed for the better enjoyment of the land, or the object itself, the period of time in use and its function, the function served by its annexation, and whether the cost of renewal would exceed the value of the property.

=== Tenant's rights of removal ===
A tenant's right of removal does not extend to agricultural fixtures at common law. However, under New South Wales legislation, tenants can remove agricultural fixtures in certain circumstances, subject to landlords' statutory rights pertaining to fixtures.

In most commercial real estate leases, a tenant has the obligation to restore the leasehold improvements back to a base building condition at the expiry of the lease term.

== See also ==
- Quicquid plantatur solo, solo cedit
