= Alluvium =

Loose soil or sediment that is eroded and redeposited in a non-marine setting

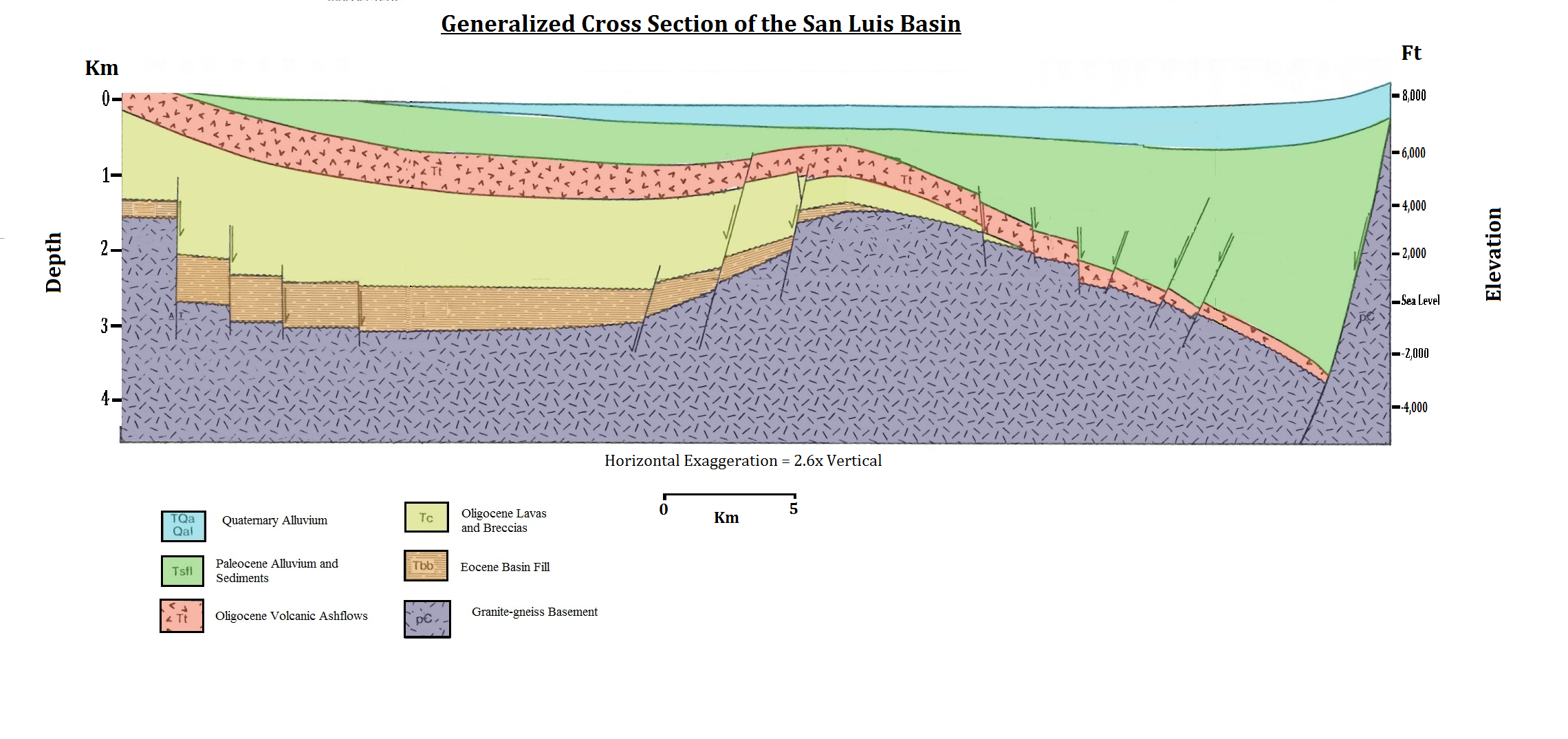
Alluvium and adjacent constituents

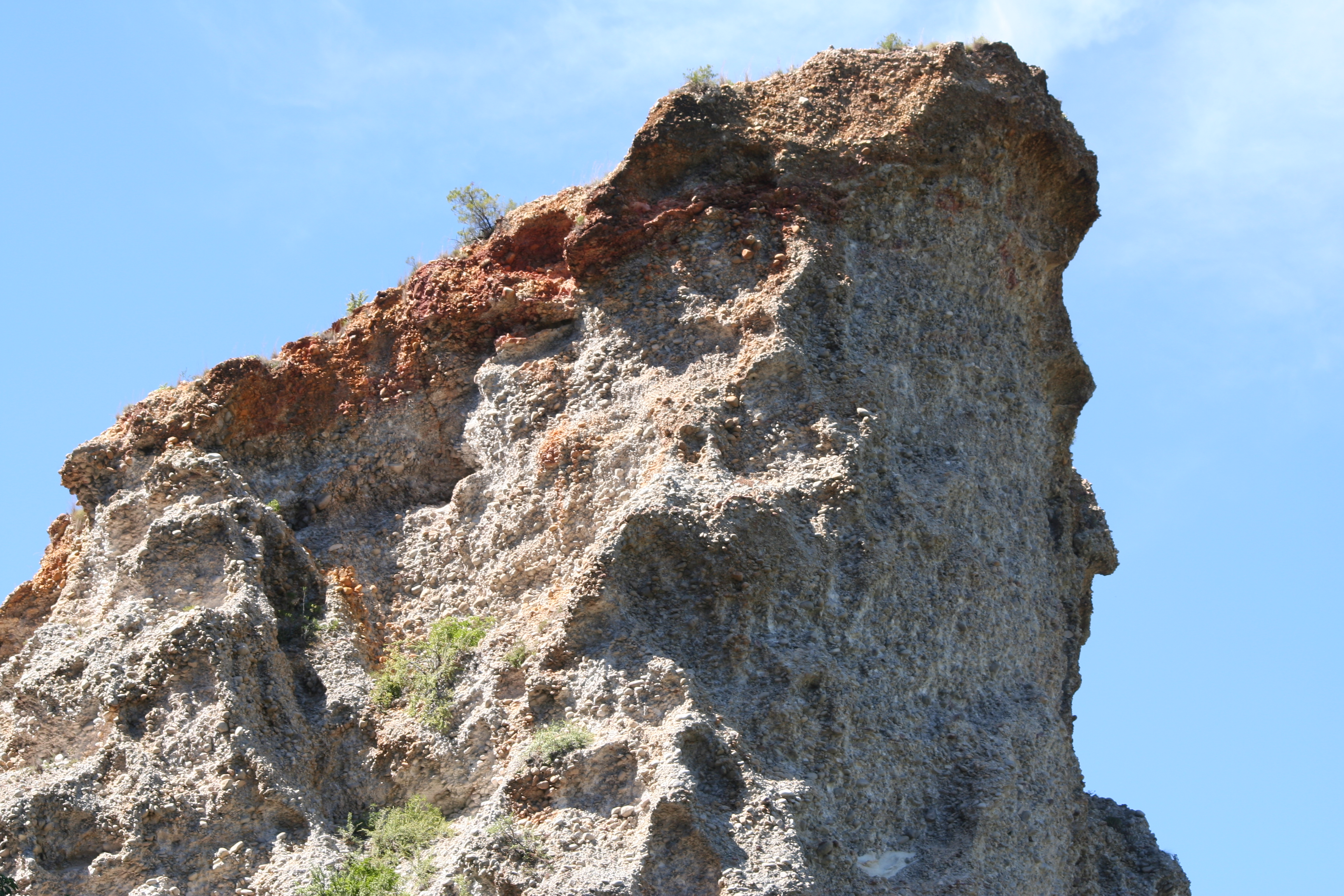
Alluvium deposits in the Gamtoos Valley in South Africa

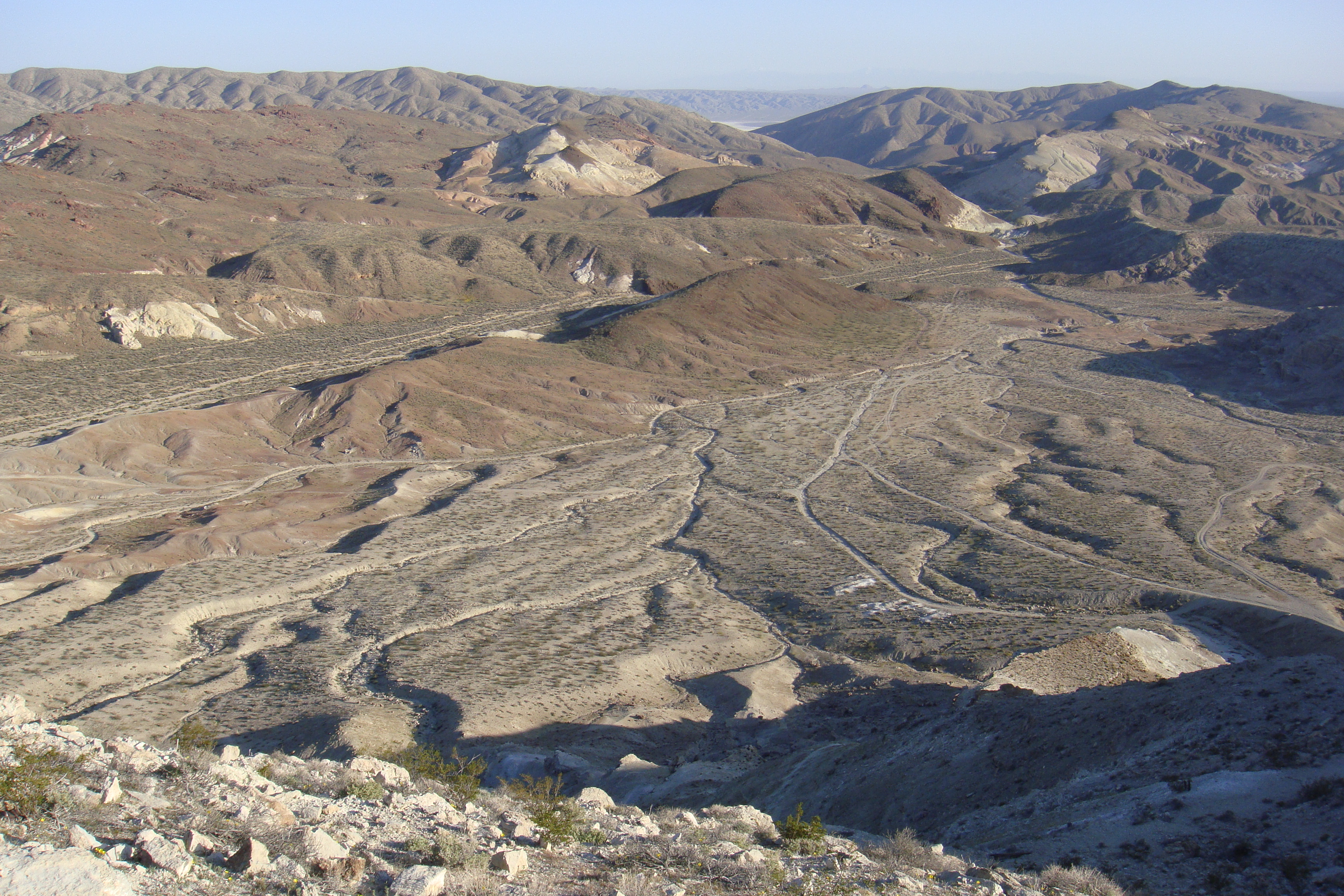
An alluvial plain in Red Rock Canyon State Park (California)

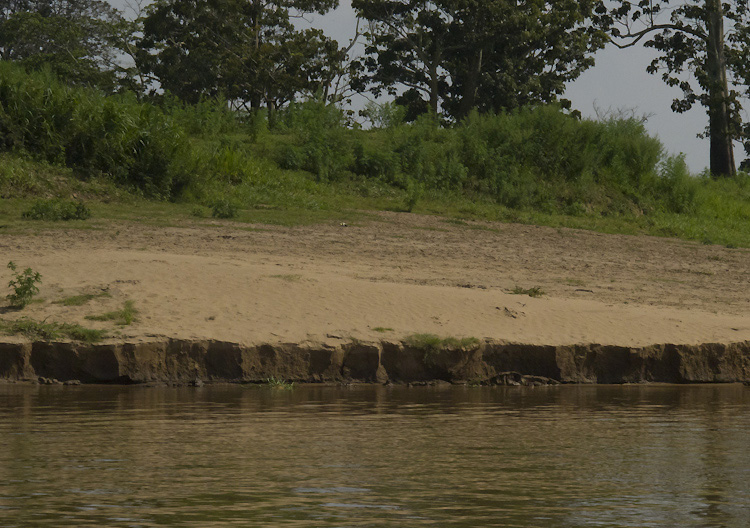
Alluvial river deposits in the Amazon basin, near Autazes, AM, Brazil. The seasonal deposits are extremely fertile and crucial to subsistence farming in the Amazon Basin along the river banks.

Alluvium (from Latin alluvius, from alluere 'to wash against') is loose clay, silt, sand, or gravel that has been deposited by running water in a stream bed, on a floodplain, in an alluvial fan or beach, or in similar settings. Alluvium is also sometimes called alluvial deposit. Alluvium is typically geologically young and is not consolidated into solid rock. Sediments deposited underwater, in seas, estuaries, lakes, or ponds, are not described as alluvium. Floodplain alluvium can be highly fertile, and supported some of the earliest human civilizations.

== Definitions ==
The present consensus is that "alluvium" refers to loose sediments of all types deposited by running water in floodplains or in alluvial fans or related landforms. However, the meaning of the term has varied considerably since it was first defined in the French dictionary of Antoine Furetière, posthumously published in 1690. Drawing upon concepts from Roman law, Furetière defined alluvion (the French term for alluvium) as new land formed by deposition of sediments along rivers and seas.

By the 19th century, the term had come to mean recent sediments deposited by rivers on top of older diluvium, which was similar in character but interpreted as sediments deposited by Noah's flood. With the rejection by geologists of the concept of a primordial universal flood, the term "diluvium" fell into disfavor and was replaced with "older alluvium". At the same time, the term "alluvium" came to mean all sediment deposits due to running water on plains. The definition gradually expanded to include deposits in estuaries, coasts, and young rock of marine and fluvial origin.

Alluvium and diluvium were grouped as colluvium in the late 19th century. "Colluvium" is now generally understood as sediments produced by gravity-driven transport on steep slopes. At the same time, the definition of "alluvium" has switched back to an emphasis on sediments deposited by river action. There continues to be disagreement over what other sediment deposits should be included under the term "alluvium".

== Age ==
Most alluvium is Quaternary in age and is often referred to as "cover" because these sediments obscure the underlying bedrock. Most sedimentary material that fills a basin ("basin fill") that is not lithified is typically lumped together as "alluvial". Alluvium of Pliocene age occurs, for example, in parts of Idaho. Alluvium of late Miocene age occurs, for example, in the valley of the San Joaquin River, California.

== See also ==
- Alluvial plain
- Bay mud
- Braided stream
- Desert pavement
- Eluvium
- Hydraulic action
- Illuvium
