= David Hume (advocate) =

British jurist and scholar

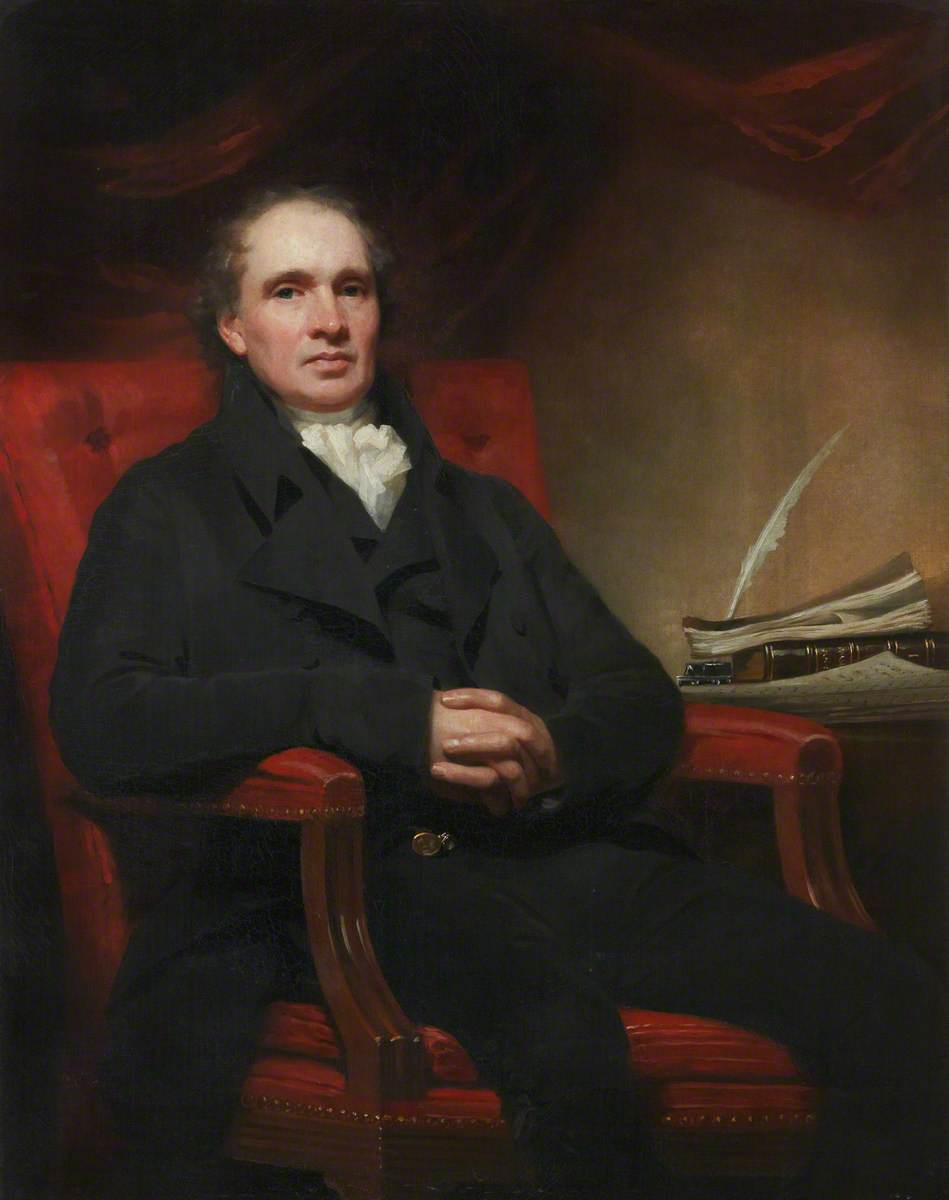
The Honourable David Hume (1757–1836), Baron of Exchequer (1822–1832), painting by Henry Raeburn

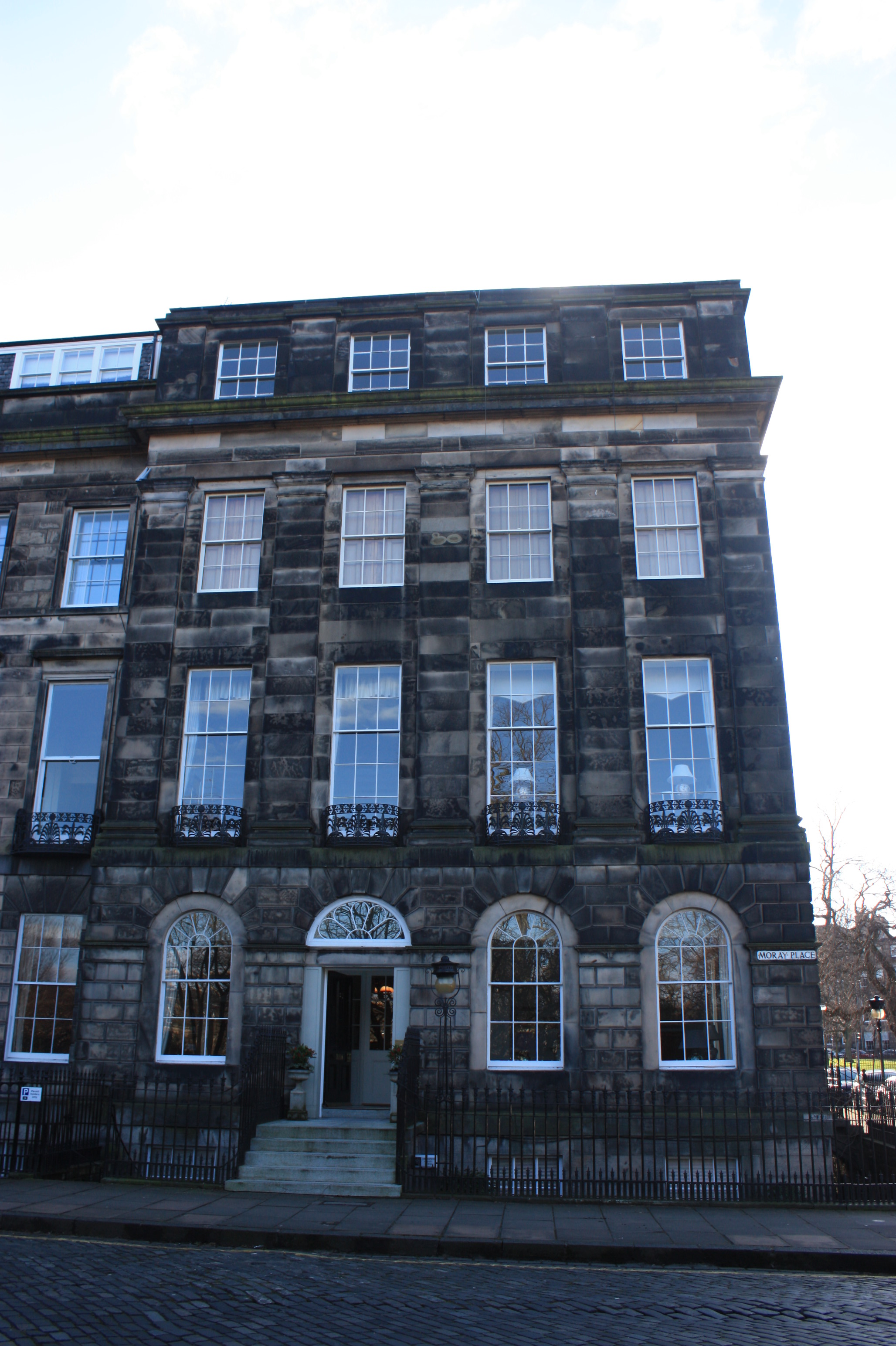
37 Moray Place, Edinburgh

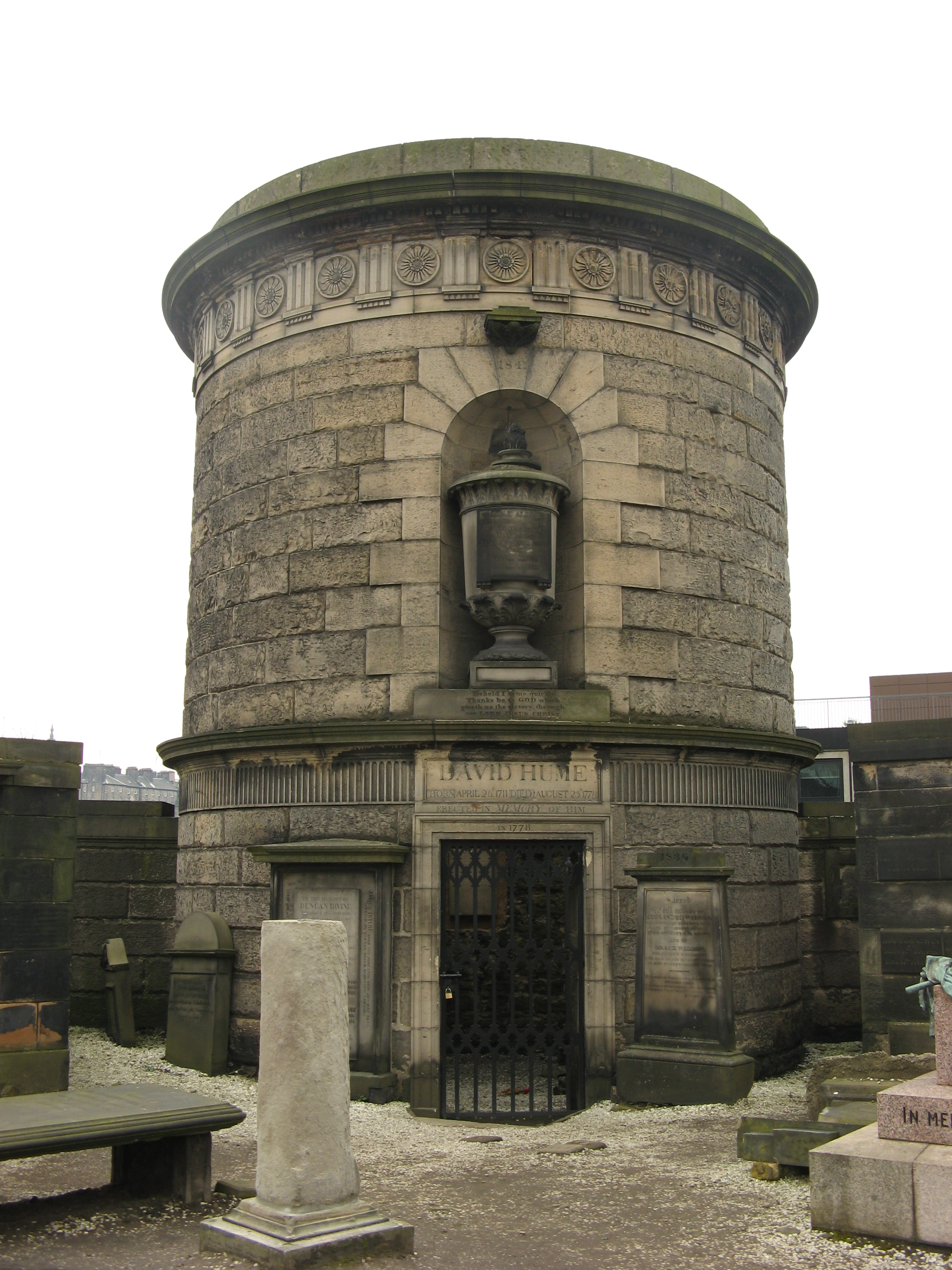
The Hume mausoleum in Old Calton Burial Ground, Edinburgh.

David Hume of Ninewells FRSE (1757–1838) was a Scottish advocate, judge and legal scholar, whose work on Scots criminal law and Scots private law has had a deep and continuing influence. He is referred to as Baron Hume to distinguish him from his uncle, David Hume the philosopher.

Hume was educated at the universities of Glasgow and Edinburgh. He became an advocate in 1779, and in 1786 was appointed Professor of Scottish Law at the University of Edinburgh, a post he retained until 1822, when he took up office as a Baron of Exchequer. In 1785 he married Jane Alder. They had three sons and three daughters.

Hume’s writings on criminal law culminated in his Commentaries on the Law of Scotland, Respecting Trial for Crimes (1797), a work that has continued to be cited in court into the 21st century. During his lifetime he never published his lectures on Scots private law, and indeed expressed the wish that they should not be published posthumously. But manuscript copies were widely circulated and were influential, sometimes being cited in court. Eventually they were published, in six volumes, between 1939 and 1958. The result was a revival of their influence, not least in the field of property law.

== Early life and education ==
David Hume was baptised 27 February 1757 at Chirnside, Berwickshire, a son of John Hume of Ninewells (1709–1786) and his wife, Agnes née Carre (1725–1785); he was a nephew of the philosopher David Hume.

From 1765 to 1767, he was enrolled as a pupil at Edinburgh high school and then studied at the University of Edinburgh where, in 1774, he studied Roman Law. He matriculated as a law student at the University of Glasgow in 1775 where he remained until 1777 and lodged with Professor John Millar, "then the most celebrated law teacher in the British Isles." In 1777 and 1778 he was a registered student of Scots law in Edinburgh.

== Advocate, sheriff-depute, professor, baron ==
Hume was admitted as to the Faculty of Advocates in 1779. In 1783 he was favoured with the appointment as part-time sheriff-depute of Berwickshire. In December 1786, he added to these the chair in Scots law in the University of Edinburgh.

In 1793 he left the sheriffdom of Berwickshire for that of Linlithgowshire. In 1811 he was made a clerk of session and resigned his post as sheriff.

In 1822 Hume became Baron David Hume on his appointment as Baron of the Exchequer. When he resigned from his professorial post, the university awarded him the degree of LLD.

== Family life ==
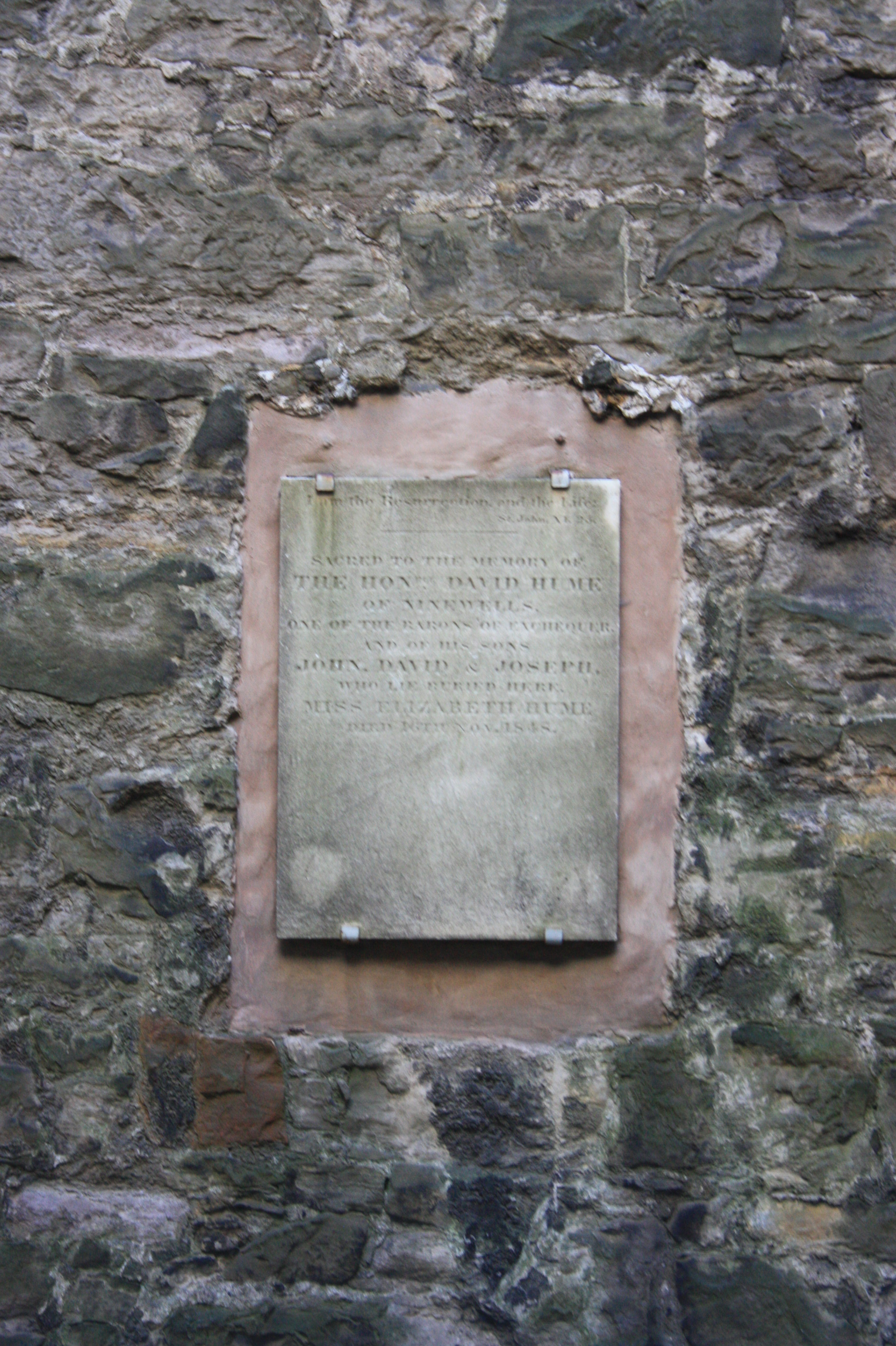
The grave of David Hume of Ninewells, Old Calton Cemetery

On 24 February 1785 he married Jane Alder and they had three sons and three daughters. She died in 1816 and he then married Jean Veitch Somner. Following his death she married Charles Maclaren.

On 27 July 1838 he died at his home, 37 Moray Place in Edinburgh and was buried in the Hume mausoleum at Calton cemetery, Edinburgh.

His three sons, John, David and Joseph, are buried with him.
