= Avulsion (common law jurisdictions) =

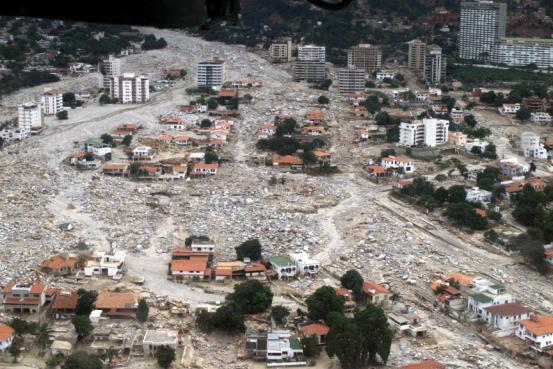
Damage after 1999 avulsion in Caraballeda

In real property law, avulsion refers to a sudden loss of land, which results from the action of water. It differs from accretion, which describes a gradual addition to land resulting from the action of water.

== Avulsion and riparian owners ==
The distinction between avulsion and accretion becomes important if a river forms the boundary between two riparian owners. In many jurisdictions, if the river changes channels by avulsion, the boundary does not change but remains in the middle of the old channel. For example, the Mississippi River forms the boundary between several U.S. states, and the principle causes states on the lower Mississippi to have occasional pieces of land on the opposite side from the rest of the state. The river changed course quickly in such locations and so the boundaries did not change.) However, as a river gradually changes through accretion, the boundary changes with it.

To prove that a change was avulsion and not accretion, it is sufficient, at least under Oklahoma law, for the owner of land that was washed away to point out approximately as much land added to the opposite bank as washed away from his bank.

== Avulsion and littoral owners ==
Avulsion can also affect littoral owners through events like hurricanes that can rapidly erode a shoreline. Florida courts have determined that littoral owners have the right to all the land that they had previous to the avulsive event.
