= Accession (property law) =

Legal term

Accession in property law is a mode of acquiring property that involves the addition of value to the property through labour or the addition of new materials. For example, a person who owns a property on a river delta also takes ownership of any additional land that builds up along the riverbank due to natural deposits or man-made deposits.

In commercial law, accession includes goods that are physically united with other goods in such a manner that the identity of the original goods is not lost. In English common law, the added value belongs to the original property's owner. For example, if the buyer of a car has parts added or replaced and the buyer then fails to make scheduled payments and the car is repossessed, the buyer has no right to the new parts because they have become a part of the whole car.

In modern common law, if the property owner allows the accession through bad faith, the adder of value is entitled to damages or title to the property. If the individual who adds value to the owner's chattel (personal property) is a trespasser or does so in bad faith, the owner retains title and the trespasser cannot recover labor or materials. The owner of the chattel may seek conversion damages for the value of the original materials plus any consequential damages. Alternatively, the owner may seek replevin (return of the chattel). However, the owner may be limited to damages if the property has changed its nature by accession. For example, if a finder discovers a gemstone and in good faith believes it to be abandoned and then cuts it and integrates it into a work of art, the true owner may be limited to recovery of damages for the value of the gemstone but not of the final art piece by way of replevin. The remedies and application of the law vary by legal jurisdiction.

== See also ==
- Accessio (Roman law)
