= Obligatio ex delicto =

In Roman law, an obligation created as a result of a delict

In Roman law, obligatio ex delicto is an obligation created as a result of a delict. While "delict" itself was never defined by Roman jurisprudents, delicts were generally composed of injurious or otherwise illicit actions, ranging from those covered by criminal law today such as theft (furtum) and robbery (rapina) to those usually settled in civil disputes in modern times such as defamation, a form of iniuria. Obligationes ex delicto therefore can be characterized as a form of private punishment, but also as a form of loss compensation.

== Sources of obligationes ex delicto ==
The core source of obligationes ex delicto is a private delict (delicta privata); public delicts could not form such obligations. Separate delicts existed within civil and praetorian law: furtum, rapina, damnum iniuria datum and iniuria were civil delicts, while metus, dolus, fraus creditorum and servi corruptio were praetorian delicts of note. A person harmed as a result of such delict had a variety of actiones – legal actions they could use as a recourse. Those are generally divided into actiones poenales, used strictly to exact punishment on the offending party, actiones reipersecutoriae, used to demand compensation, and actiones mixtae, a combination of the two.

The actio most reflective of obligationes ex delicto is the first of the three. Actiones poenales were tied strictly to the offender's person and could not be introduced against the heirs of an offender. The victim's heir, however, was allowed to pursue action against the offender, so long as the delict was of a material character (iniuria, as a form of personal injustice, could generally only be pursued at the behest of the offended person themselves).

The actiones resulting in the formation of an obligatio ex delicto were strictly tied to the delict they were meant to address. In the cases of the aforementioned delicts, those were:

- Actio furti manifesti and actio furti nec manifesti – in cases of furtum, or theft. Theft was divided into manifestum (where the thief was caught in the act) and nec manifestum (where the theft was uncovered otherwise). The resulting obligation was to pay two times (in case of furtum nec manifestum) or four times (for furtum manifestum) the value of the stolen goods. Alongside this obligation, an obligation to return the stolen goods themselves (if possible) was simultaneously created.
- Actio vi bonorum raptorum – in cases of rapina, or robbery. For most of Roman legal history, rapina was considered a form of furtum. Justinian, however, viewed it as a fourth delict of civil law. If found guilty, the offender was obligated to pay four times the value of the stolen goods - one fourth as compensation and three fourth as penalty.
- Actio legis Aquiliae – in cases of damnum iniuria datum, or injury to property. This actio was compensatory in character if the offender did not object to their fault. Otherwise, if found guilty, the offender would be obligated to pay twice the value of the damaged item. This duality led to its classification as a mixed action.
- Actio iniuriam aestimatoria – in cases of iniuria, which covered a variety of personal injury, from physical harm to slander and denigration. As a highly personal action, it could not be brought forward by anyone but the injured person themselves (in the case of familial relations, the head of the family was considered the victim indirectly, in cases where, for instance, his son or wife were injured) - not even by their heirs. The victim (or in cases of heavy injury, iniuria atrox - the praetor) set an estimate monetary value of the harm done, which set an upper bound for the judge's ruling. If the offender is found guilty, an obligation is made to pay the amount determined by the judge.
- Actio doli – in cases of dolus, or purposeful deceit causing material loss. It was mostly compensatory - if found guilty, the offender was obligated to pay one time the damages of his actions. Actio doli could only be brought forward within a year of the delict occurring, and could not be brought against some persons, such as the victim's parents or persons of higher social class than the victim.
- Actio quod metus causa – in cases of metus, or threat, specifically forcing one to partake in a legal transaction. It could not only be directed against the person making the threat, but all those who stand to gain from the forced transaction. If found guilty, the offender was obligated to pay four times the damages suffered. Actio quo metus causa could only be brought within a year of the delict occurring.
- Actio Pauliana – in cases of fraus creditorum, or defrauding creditors. The aim of the actio - uniquely - was to invalidate transactions made to prevent creditors from collecting - it did not directly create an obligation for the debtor to pay, rather it allowed an existing obligation to be fulfilled.
- Actio servi corrupti – in cases of servi corruptio, or "corrupting servants", by, for example, inciting them to rebel. If found guilty, the offender was obligated to pay twice the damages suffered. This actio did not expire and could be brought forward as long as the offender was alive.

== Obligationes quasi ex delicto ==
Under Justinian, a separate category of obligations was designated, taking form from actions which were undesirable, but not so much (or were not as common) as to be classified as outright delicts. This included four quasi-delicts:

- Iudex qui litem suam facit – the responsibility of a judge, specifically in cases of unjust proceedings. If a judge was found to have led proceedings incorrectly, they were considered to have brought the conflict onto themselves (litem suam facit) and therefore faced the same obligations as the offender in any given case.
- Deiectum vel effusum – throwing objects or pouring liquids out of a building. Actio de deiectis vel effusis permitted persons harmed by such objects or liquids to seek compensation from the person inhabiting the housing from which the object (or liquid) was thrown. Personal involvement in the act itself was not required of the offender, separating this from the above-mentioned actio legis Aquiliae. If a freeman died as a result of deiectum vel effusum, any citizen could bring forward an actio de deiectis vel effusis, making this a "popular action" (actio popularis). In practice, only family members were usually permitted to bring the actio forward, however.
- Postium aut suspensum, or endangering traffic. This quasi-delict focused on objects, usually placed or suspended above public roads, that could endanger passersby. Actio de posito aut suspenso could be brought forward by any citizen, and obligated the owner of the endangering object to pay a fine to the claimant - it was therefore an actio popularis, but unlike the actio de deiectis vel effusis or more generally the actio iniuriam aestimatoria, the mere possibility of harm (endangerment) was cause enough for the action to be brought forward.
- Owners of ships, taverns and stables (nauta, caupo, stabularius) were responsible for injuries of their patrons, such as theft or injury, if those injuries were caused by the persons employed by the owner - they are obligated to pay twice the damages. This is viewed as a form of punishing owners for bad employment practices.
