= Delict (Scots law) =

Actionable civil wrongs in Scots law

Delict in Scots law is the area of law concerned with those civil wrongs breaching a duty of care, inflicting loss or harm, and thereby triggering the wrongdoer’s legal liability. The Scots use of the term 'delict' is consistent with the jurisdiction's connection with Civilian jurisprudence; Scots private law has a 'mixed' character, blending together elements borrowed from Civil law and Common law, as well as indigenous Scottish developments. The term tort law, or 'law of torts', is used in Anglo-American (Common law) jurisdictions to describe the area of law in those systems. Unlike in a system of torts, the Scots law of delict operates on broad principles of liability for wrongdoing: 'there is no such thing as an exhaustive list of named delicts in the law of Scotland. If the conduct complained of appears to be wrongful, the law of Scotland will afford a remedy even if there has not been any previous instance of a remedy being given in similar circumstances'. While some terms such as assault and defamation are used in systems of tort law, their technical meanings differ in Scottish delict.

Although the law of delict affords reparation for wrongdoing such as assault, invasions of privacy and interference with property, 'in modern times statistically most of the case law on delict has been concerned with the law of negligence, interpretation of statutory regulations in workplace accident cases, and (particularly in the nineteenth century) defamation'. As in South Africa, there is no nominate delict of negligence in Scotland, but rather the law recognises that delictual liability will arise where one person negligently [or indeed intentionally or recklessly] causes loss to another. In addition to this, the law of delict will afford remedy where legally recognised affront has been suffered, a pursuer's property interests have been interfered with, or some specific and nominate form of wrongdoing has been proven to occur (e.g. where the pursuer has been defamed).

== Overview ==
Delict is borrowed from Latin delictum and, as a branch of Scots law. In Roman law, there were four 'institutional' delicts recognised by Justinian, damnum injuria datum (loss wrongfully caused), injuria (wrongdoing which infringes a person's dignity), furtum (theft) and rapina (theft with violence). Stair, the Scottish Institutional Writer, noted that these four delicts had a degree of historical pedigree, but nonetheless rejected the Roman system of nominate delicts in favour of an analysis which identified the interests of persons which, if infringed, could trigger a right of reparation in delict. These interests are protected by general principles which differ depending on the interest in question: some interests are patrimonial (concerned with 'what a person has') while others are 'non-patrimonial' (concerned with 'who a person is'): patrimonial interests are repaired by actions based on the loss caused by the defender's wrongful conduct, or are safeguarded by actions for interdict, while harm to non-patrimonial interests is repaired without reference to 'loss', but with an award of solatium taking into account the affront suffered by the pursuer. By way of a legal fiction, 'personal injury' is treated as (physical) 'damage done', with the net effect that 'the actio injuriarum root of Scots law infuses the [nominate] delict assault as much as any development of the lex Aquilia' and wrongdoing that results in physical harm to a person may give rise to a claim of both damages and solatium. This separation of protection of the physical integrity of the person from the principles which afford protection to other non-patrimonial interests 'has had consequences not only for the details of the law protecting those interests, but also for determining what are the fundamental principles and doctrinal theoretical structure of the law of delict as a whole. In particular, this phenomenon provides much of the explanation why the Scots common law of delict is not today structured under two broad heads, Aquilian liability and iniuria [in the nominate sense] (adapted and modified by human rights law and statute law).'

Although there is no clear divide between liability based on iniuria and Aquilian liability in Scots law, as there is in South Africa, actions may as yet be predicated on either iniuria alone or damnum injuria datum depending on the interest infringed. ‘Liability in delict, with few exceptions, is referable to the concepts of injuria or damnum injuria datum’, with statutory innovations and nominate delicts developed at common law supplementing the general actions available for the reparation of patrimonial loss or non-patrimonial injury. Hence, there remains scope for the law to protect non-patrimonial interests such as privacy or dignity on grounds that 'the actio iniuriarum is sufficiently wide to cover any deliberate conduct causing affront or offence to the dignity, security or privacy of the individual' although few modern cases have attempted seriously to argue this. In practice, delictual actions which call before the courts of Scotland are, if not concerned with a particular nominate delict (such as defamation), predicated on a claim that 'loss' has been caused by wrongful conduct (and so based on Aquilian liability rather than on the actio iniuriarum).

The modern Scots law pertaining to reparation for negligent wrongdoing is, as might be expected from the above, based on the lex Aquilia and so affords reparation in instances of damnum injuria datum - literally loss wrongfully caused - with the wrongdoing in such instances generated by the defender's culpa (i.e. fault). In any instance in which a pursuer (A) has suffered loss at the hands of the wrongful conduct of the defender (B), B is under a legal obligation to make reparation. If B's wrongdoing were intentional in the circumstances, or so reckless that an 'intention' may be constructively inferred (on the basis that culpa lata dolo aequiparatur - 'gross negligence is the same as intentional fault'), then it follows axiomatically that B will be liable to repair any damage done to A's property, person or economic interest: 'wherever a defender intentionally harms the pursuer - provided the interest harmed is regarded as reparable - the defender incurs delictual liability'. If the pursuer has suffered loss as the result of the defender's conduct, yet the defender did not intend to harm the pursuer, nor behave so recklessly that intent might be constructively inferred, the pursuer must demonstrate that the defender's conduct was negligent in order to win their case. Negligence can be established, by the pursuer, by demonstrating that the defender owed to them a 'duty of care' which they ultimately breached by failing to live up to the expected standard of care. If this can be shown, then the pursuer must also establish that the defender's failure to live up to the expected standard of care ultimately caused the loss (damnum) complained of.

The landmark decision on establishing the existence of a duty of care, for Scotland and for the rest of the United Kingdom, is the House of Lords appeal case, Donoghue v. Stevenson

== Protected interests in the law of delict ==
=== Patrimonial interests ===
The Roman lex Aquilia was originally concerned only with damage directly done to certain types of property - slaves and 'four-footed beasts'. Reparation for what is now known as 'personal injury' was barred under the legislation in view of the principle dominus membrorum suorum nemo videtur (no one is to be regarded as the owner of his own limbs); in effect, a Roman paterfamilias could not raise a claim for 'damage' done to his own body, as he was not, in law, a 'self-owner' and so there was no 'property damage' for the law to take cognizance of. This notion was received into Scots law, hence 'while [following negligent injury to their body, a free person] could claim damages for medical expenses and loss of earnings, [they] could not claim for other non-patrimonial types of harm because of the principle that a freeman’s body is of inestimable value'. This changed in 1795 with the (unreported) case of Gardner v Ferguson, which 'is generally regarded as the first case in the modern Scots law of negligence'. Since that time, it has been recognised in Scotland that one's physical - and by extension one's mental - health might be 'damnified' for the purposes of an Aquilian action, hence intentional, reckless or negligent invasion of the property, person or psychiatric wellbeing of another will, in principle, generate liability for reparation in delict.

Economic losses which derive from physical or psychiatric damage will, in principle, be recoverable as 'derivative economic loss'. Pure economic interests separated from one's property, person and mental wellbeing are, in principle, protected patrimonial interests and so ex facie causing another pure economic loss by way of one's wrongful conduct generates a right of reparation in the pursuer. In practice, claims for 'pure economic loss' - i.e. loss which is not connected to damage done to one's person, property or mental health - are limited with reference to the rules pertaining to the duty of care and on remoteness of damages: ‘The grand rule on the subject of damages is, that none can be claimed except such as naturally and directly arise out of the wrong done; and such, therefore, as may reasonably be supposed to have been in the view of the wrongdoer.’ Unless a pursuer in such a case can demonstrate that the defender intended to cause them pure economic loss, or was reckless to that end, they must show that a duty of care was owed towards them and that the loss was directly caused by the breach of this duty.

=== Non-patrimonial interests ===
The Scots law pertaining to the protection of non-patrimonial - i.e. dignitary or personality - interests is said to be 'a thing of shreds and patches'. This notwithstanding, there is ‘little historical basis in Scots law for the kind of structural difficulties that have restricted English law' in the development of mechanisms to protect so-called 'rights of personality'. The actio iniuriarum heritage of Scots law gives the courts scope to recognise, and afford reparation in, cases in which no patrimonial (or 'quasi-patrimonial') 'loss' has occurred, but a recognised dignitary interest has nonetheless been invaded through the wrongful conduct of the defender. For such reparation to be offered, however, the non-patrimonial interest must be deliberately affronted: negligent interference with a non-patrimonial interest will not be sufficient to generate liability. An actio iniuriarum requires that the conduct of the defender be 'contumelious' - that is, it must show such hubristic disregard of the pursuer's recognised personality interest that an intention to affront (animus iniuriandi) might be imputed.

== Reparation for wrongdoing ==
=== Reparation for negligence ===
==== Overview ====
In principle, only interests which may be 'damnified' are recognised as reparable under the principles of Aquilian liability and so in practice this means that harm done, through negligence, to non-patrimonial interests does not generate a right of reparation under the principles outlined below. With that said, since the end of the 18th century, it has been recognised that so-called 'personal injury' cases are in principle to be treated no differently from cases concerning damage done to patrimonial interests.

==== Duty of care ====
The 1932 case of Donoghue v Stevenson, also known as ‘The Paisley Snail case’, is considered to have defined the concept of duty of care. Mrs. Donoghue was in a cafe in Paisley where she consumed a bottle of ginger beer which contained a decomposing snail in an opaque bottle. The snail was invisible to the naked eye until the contents of the bottle had been almost completely consumed. Consequently, she suffered serious gastric problems. To whom do we owe a duty of care? Donoghue says that we owe this duty to our neighbours:

“The rule that you are to love your neighbour becomes in law, you must not injure your neighbour; and the lawyer's question, Who is my neighbour? receives a restricted reply. You must take reasonable care to avoid acts or omissions which you can reasonably foresee would be likely to injure your neighbour. Who, then, in law, is my neighbour? The answer seems to be —persons who are so closely and directly affected by my act that I ought reasonably to have them in contemplation as being so affected when I am directing my mind to the acts or omissions which are called in question.” per Lord Atkin at 44 of SC

Since Donoghue v Stevenson, duty of care has been expanded by various cases. One of the most noted cases is the English case Caparo Industries v Dickman. It was held in this case that any extension of the circumstances in which a duty of care should be owed should be developed cautiously. This developed a further criterion: is it fair just and reasonable to impose a duty? This new tripartite test was introduced to personal injury cases in Scotland in the case of Gibson v Orr.

===== Breach of duty of care =====
The idea of delict is not to prevent a person's acts or omissions from ever causing harm occurring, but is to take reasonable precautions in the circumstances to prevent harm. This is seen in the ratio of Muir v Glasgow Corporation.

To be sued successfully under delict it must be proven that a defender owed a duty of care to an individual, that they have breached this duty of care (i.e. taken insufficient precautions to prevent harm), it is fair, just and reasonable to impose a duty of care in the circumstances and that there is a causal link between your wrongdoing and the loss suffered by the individual in question. In determining what constitutes sufficient precautions several factors apply:

====== 1) Probability of injury ======
In Bolton v Stone, a cricket ball was hit out of the ground, over a fence 17 feet high, striking and injuring a passer-by. It was held that despite the fact that the precautions in place were not sufficient to prevent such harm occurring, the defender had not been in breach of his duty of care. This was because in the past 30 years a ball had only left the grounds over that fence 6 times, making the likelihood of such an injury merely a remote possibility rather than a reasonable probability.

====== 2) Severity of injury ======
In Paris v Stepney Borough Council, it was decided that a welder was not owed a duty of care to be provided with safety goggles (today this duty would exist), but that due to Mr Paris' unique circumstances (he only had one eye) the severity of his potential (and resulting) injury was so great that he be owed a more comprehensive duty of care.

====== 3) Availability of precautions ======
According to Roe v Minister of Health, when the danger of an act is not known (e.g. working with Asbestos prior to knowing it was dangerous) or the precautions are not known and it is reasonable not to know about them, no duty can exist to provide such precaution.

====== 4) Foreseeability of injury ======
In Hughes v Lord Advocate, two young boys were playing near an unattended manhole surrounded by paraffin lamps. One boy fell in and the lamp exploded causing burns. Held: even although it was unforeseeable that a child would be injured in such a way in such circumstances, considering that an unattended site such as this would be likely to constitute an allurement for young children it was foreseeable that there was a risk of injury by burning. Since that was what in fact occurred, the nature of the damage was reasonably foreseeable and the boy won his case. It was decided that the type of injury arising from the wrong must be of a foreseeable type.

====== Burden of proof ======
Normally the burden of proof is on the pursuer to show that the defender has not achieved the standard of care expected of him in the circumstances. However, this can be difficult if not impossible where the cause of an accident cannot be discovered. In these circumstances the doctrine of res ipsa loquitur (the facts speak for themselves) may be of use to the pursuer since it transfers the burden of proof to the defender. In other words, if the pursuer can successfully plead res ipsa loquitur the law presumes that the defender has been negligent and it is up to the defender to provide a plausible explanation for the accident which is inconsistent with his negligence.

To rely upon this doctrine the pursuer must establish two things:

1. The offending ‘thing’ must be under the exclusive control of the defender.
2. Such an accident would not happen in the ordinary course of events unless those in control were negligent.
- Example case: Scott v London & St Catherines Docks
  Facts: S was injured when a bag of sugar fell onto him as he was walking past L’s warehouse. No one could say how the bag of sugar had come to fall on S.
  Held: since L was in exclusive control of their warehouse and bags of sugar do not ordinarily fall out of warehouses without negligence, it was up to L to provide an alternative explanation. Since L could not, it was presumed that L had not achieved the standard of care expected.

===== Defences =====
Once the pursuer has established on the balance of probabilities that he was owed a duty of care by the defender, and that the defender’s failure to achieve the standard of care expected caused the loss or injury for which the pursuer is seeking a remedy, the pursuer may be said to have established a prima facie case. This means that ‘at first sight’ the pursuer will win and the burden of proof shifts to the defender. The defender can attempt to avoid liability or have the amount of damages which is sought by the pursuer reduced by putting forward appropriate defences or attempting to argue that the damage or injury for which the pursuer is seeking compensation is too remote a consequence of the defender’s negligence.

===== Volenti non fit injuria =====
This Latin maxim basically means ‘to one consenting, no wrong can be done’. Thus if a pursuer appreciates the risk associated with his activity, but nevertheless continues in such a way as to suggest that he is accepting the risk, this will provide the defender with a complete defence - i.e. one which will allow the defender to completely escape liability to the pursuer. It is up to the defender to show that the pursuer has accepted the risk and obviously this means that the defender must first show that the pursuer was appropriately informed of the risk.

Note that if the defender does provide a plausible alternative explanation the burden of proof then passes back to the pursuer.
