= Negotiorum gestio =

Negotiorum gestio ([nəˌgō.shē-ˈȯr-əm-ˈgestēˌō], Latin for "management of business") is a form of spontaneous voluntary agency in which an intervenor or intermeddler, the gestor, acts on behalf and for the benefit of a principal (dominus negotii), but without the latter's prior consent. The gestor is only entitled to reimbursement for expenses and not to remuneration, the underlying principle being that negotiorum gestio is intended as an act of generosity and friendship and not to allow the gestor to profit from his intermeddling. This form of intervention is classified as a quasi-contract and found in civil-law jurisdictions and in mixed systems (e.g. Louisiana, Scots, South African, and Philippine laws).

For example, while you are traveling abroad, a typhoon hits your home town and the roofing of your house is in danger. To avoid the catastrophic situation, your neighbour does something urgently necessary. You are the 'principal' and your neighbour here is the 'gestor', the act of which saved your house is the negotiorum gestio.

It originated as a Roman legal institution in which an individual acted on behalf of another, without his asking and without remuneration. It was considered a part of officium (duty), for instance, to defend a friend's or neighbour's interests while the friend or neighbour was away.

The principal, or dominus negotii (or rarely dominus negotiorum dominus rei gestae), is bound to indemnify the gestor for the expenses and liabilities incurred. If the principal fails to do so, there is unjust enrichment, and the gestor then has a claim to bring an action for restitution. In Napoleonic jurisdictions, as well as others like Louisiana, the action takes the form of the actio de in rem verso. In South Africa, on the other hand, multiple restitutionary actions lie for negotiorum gestio, namely:

1. condictio indebiti;
2. condictio causa data causa non secuta;
3. condictio ob turpem vel iniustam causam;
4. condictio sine causa specialis

Negotiorum gestio is not recognised at common law, despite certain English salvage cases, as well as some cases in equity where trustees were on occasion remunerated for services voluntarily rendered. Nevertheless, the concept is known in English legal theory as ‘necessitous intervention’.

It is variously known as follows:

- Belgium: "agency of necessity" in Dutch and "management of affairs" in French (Dutch: zaakwaarneming or French: gestion d'affaires) under the Belgian Civil Code
- Czech Republic: "uncommanded agency" (Czech: nepřikázané jednatelství) under the Czech Civil Code
- France: "management of affairs" (French: gestion d'affaires) under the French Civil Code
- Germany: "agency without specific authorisation" (German: Geschäftsführung ohne Auftrag) under the German Civil Code
- Italy: "management of another's affairs" (Italian: gestione di affare altrui) under the Italian Civil Code
- Japan: "management of business" (Japanese: 事務管理, jimu kanri) under the Japanese Civil Code
- Louisiana: "management of affairs" under the Louisiana Civil Code
- Netherlands: "agency of necessity" (Dutch: zaakwaarneming) under the Dutch Civil Code
- Scotland: Negotiorum gestio (sometimes rendered 'benevolent intervention', though generally the phrase negotiorum gestio is used even in modern statutes).
- South Africa: negotiorum gestio (sometimes "management of affairs") under South African law
- Sweden: negotiorum gestio and "services without assignment" (Swedish: tjänster utan uppdrag)
- Switzerland: "business management without authority" in German and "management of affairs" in French (German: Geschäftsführung ohne Auftrag or French: gestion d'affaires) under the Swiss Civil Code
- Poland: "management of another's business without an order" (Polish: Prowadzenie cudzych spraw bez zlecenia) under the Polish Civil Code
- Portugal: "management of business" (Portuguese: gestão de negócios) under the Portuguese Civil Code (Articles 464 to 472)
- Russia: "action in the interest of another (without instruction)" (Russian: действия в чужом интересе (без поручения)) under the Russian Federation Civil Code
- Taiwan: "management of affairs without mandate" (Chinese: 無因管理; pinyin: wú yīn guǎnlǐ) under the Taiwanese Civil Code
- Thailand: "management of affairs without mandate" (Thai: จัดการงานนอกสั่ง; RTGS: chat kan ngan nok sang) under the Civil and Commercial Code
- Turkey: "management of affairs without mandate (Turkish: Vekaletsiz işgörme) under the Turkish Code of Obligations (Articles 526-531)

== See also ==
- Roman Law
- Law of agency
