= Furtum =

Theft in Roman law

Furtum was a delict of Roman law comparable to the modern offence of theft (as it is usually translated) despite being a civil and not criminal wrong. In the classical law and later, it denoted the contrectatio ("handling") of most types of property with a particular sort of intention – fraud and in the later law, a view to gain. It is unclear whether a view to gain was always required or added later, and, if the latter, when. This meant that the owner did not consent, although Justinian broadened this in at least one case. The law of furtum protected a variety of property interests, but not land, things without an owner, or types of state or religious things. An owner could commit theft by taking his things back in certain circumstances, as could a borrower or similar user through misuse.

The Romans distinguished between "manifest" and "non-manifest" theft based on how close to the scene of the crime the thief was caught, although exactly where the line was, was debated by jurists. Under the Twelve Tables, death or flogging could be expected for a manifest thief, later changed to damages of four times the thing. The penalty for non-manifest theft was two times. There were complementary actions against the occupier of the property where the stolen goods were found, if the defendant did not bring the thing to court or refused a search. Vindicatio or condictio could also be undertaken by the owner of the thing, in addition to an action under furtum.

== Contrectatio ==
Contrectatio meant "handling" and was established as the prohibited action associated with furtum before the end of the Roman Republic. Furtum had in the early and mid-Republic required the carrying away of a thing. This was widened and there are several examples from the classical Rome and later where it is even hard to find physical contact in any sense. Contrectatio extended to dealing with the thing as if the owner, and "physical interference" can be considered a more accurate term than just touching. The idea of furtum, and conrectatio in particular, broadened during the republic to complement the narrowly defined Lex Aquilia. This did, for example, include using a borrowed thing in a way which went beyond that agreed with the lender (furtum usus), such as borrowing a horse and riding it for longer than agreed. During the Republic, no distinction was made in language between furtum usus and furtum in general. Contrectio included what might be thought of as fraud: knowingly accepting a wrongful payment, or embezzlement, for example. The case of wrongful payment is problematic, because a mistaken payment still transferred ownership; it seems contradictory that the receiver was granted ownership and still liable for theft. To accept a thing as a pledge knowing that it did not belong to the pledgor was also furtum – not merely acting as an accomplice. Plautus, a playwright, suggests that failing to report a theft after the fact was furtum, but this should not be assumed. The development of contrectio as the preferred prohibited act accompanied that of the criminal law, the actio doli (for fraud) and the Aquilian actions.

An accomplice could be sued if he had provided help ope consilio – a physical act relating to the method of execution, rather than mere encouragement. It appears that Labeo was the first to require help or advice, and earlier sources suggest that both help and advice was required. Labeo's version was certainly entrenched by the early second century AD. An accomplice was treated as if he himself had committed the crime. Only one person needed to have handled the thing for all wrongdoers to be liable. Republican jurists were harder on accomplices than later jurists under the Roman Empire. Indeed, Ulpian considers the unwitting accomplice, who accidentally knocks out of the victim's hand some coins which are then stolen, an accomplice to the theft. Some commentators have gone as far to say that the veteres ("ancients") may not have even required a third party to remove the coins, as long as they were otherwise lost to the owner.

== Requisite intent ==
The requisite intention (sometimes described as "animus furandi") was a fraud (fraudulosa). The act had to be against the will of the owner. The prospective thief also had to believe that he did not have the owner's consent. This is confirmed in Gaius in the case of the slave who alerts his master to the fact that he has been bribed by another to steal from his master. The owner now consents to the thief's appropriation so he can be caught in the act, and therefore prevents the crime actually occurring. Justinian, however, reverses this distinction for public policy reasons, and thus creates rather an anomaly. The acts had to be done deliberately, not merely negligently.

Intention to make a gain was probably necessary in Justinian's time. It is thought that this was the case during classical Rome, as well: an example of Gaius is quoted in the Digest, and implies so; Sabinus is quoted by Gellius as including such a condition. It is not entirely clear, however. This rule complements the existence of damnum iniuria datum. In a notable example, a man, acting dishonestly, calls a mule-driver to court frivolously, which caused the mules to be lost. Although this was classed as theft, there is no obvious intention to make a gain. This may have been because if the mules were lost, they had necessarily been stolen by someone. That being the case, the perpetrator could be held as an accomplice. Damnum iniuria datum focussed on wrongful damage to property. It is then, in form, more appropriate an action than furtum in cases where a loss has been caused, although the penalty nature of furtum did mean it could result in a higher payment.

Infantes (young children) and furiosi ("lunatics") were considered incapable of formulating the necessary intention and could therefore not commit furtum.

== Protected interests ==
The thing must be movable, if it is to be stolen. Whilst an immovable thing cannot be carried away, the pre-classical extension to other types of interference with property means that immovable were not by their nature excluded. Gaius indicates that certain veteres ("ancients") believed that land could be stolen. This was also the view of Sabinus, but it was rejected by other classical jurists. A thing separated from the land could be stolen, however. Usucapio was particularly important with regard to land, and therefore the exclusion may have been retained to help the good faith possessor of land to usucapt. Res sanctae and religiosia were covered by separate delicts; and one could not steal a res nullius. One can commit furtum of one's own property, for example by taking back a thing pledged to a creditor, or by secretly reclaiming one's own thing from a good faith possessor. Free persons could also be stolen, for example, children; a wife in manu; indicati and auctorati. This was probably a hang-over from a time when dominium (ownership), manus and potestas were indistinct and not formally separate. Res hereditariae could not be stolen, perhaps for want of a suitable plaintiff with a sufficient interest.

The general rule was that anyone with an interest in the safety of the thing stolen may sue. It could be that the owner did not have a sufficient interest to bring an action. If one person had a positive right in a thing, such as a pledgee, usufructuary, or good faith possessor, both he and the owner could sue. The unsecured creditor could not. Those obliged by contract to return the thing, and other forms of "negative interest", had an action available at the expense of owner. This was only true so long as the person obliged was solvent – that is, under a real risk of losing out by a theft. If the person obliged was insolvent, the owner would have an action instead. The plaintiff with a negative interest was precluded from an action if it was by his own fault (dolus), or other dishonest. The lower standard of care required of a depositee meant he could not be sued by a depositor, and so had no action available for furtum. A vendor, who had agreed a price but not delivered his thing, retained legal ownership of the thing. Thus if the thing was stolen, the vendor had the action on the theft because he was liable to the purchaser.

== Applicable actions ==
There were several possible actions available to the claimant. In the typical theft, the damages were a multiple of the value of the thing stolen, available through the actio furti. A subsequent rise in the value of the thing stolen whilst the claim was being brought was borne by the defendant, if found liable. If part of a thing was stolen, probably the value of that part. A successful action for theft brought with it infamia for the thief. If the claimant had an interest short of ownership, then the value of that interest formed the basis for the damages instead. An heir of the claimant could sue, but the heir of a thief was not liable. Some types of theft were criminal wrongs by the end of the republic. Ulpian reports that criminal proceedings were more common, and Julian that a successful prosecution prevented a civil action under furtum. Even furtum itself was not compensatory but penal in nature.

In the time of the Twelve Tables, a "manifest" thief and a "non-manifest" thief were treated differently. Manifest theft denoted some sort of being caught in the act. Being found later with the stolen thing was not manifest theft, unless it was found during a seemingly bizarre ritual (furtum lance licioque conceptum), whereby the searcher would come with a silver platter and wearing few clothes. Gaius is highly critical of the by-then obsolete ritual, imagining the platter was for removal of the goods. In practice, it may have been for an offering to the household gods. Being almost naked would have prevented the searcher bringing with him a thing he would then pretend to find. Gaius reports that manifest theft brought a penalty of a severe flogging and enslavement for freemen. Slaves found liable for manifest furtum would be thrown off to their deaths off the Tarpeian Rock. The manifest thief was at the time of the Twelve tables was not given a full trial, his case merely adjudicated by a magistrate. The extreme penalty must have acted as a deterrent. The victim could kill the thief on the spot in two situations: at night, and where the thief was using a weapon and had been verbally warned. The verbal warning was designed to make the act of killing more public, and prevent it being an underhand way of committing murder. This rule was accepted by Gaius but is questioned by Ulpian. The penalty for non-manifest theft was always double damages.

By the classical period, physical punishment had been abandoned for manifest theft and Gaius records merely four-times damages, introduced by the praetor. This meant, somewhat strangely, that a praetorian action could be more serious than a civil action, which was unusual. Gaius also elaborates slightly on what constitutes manifest theft. He says that most jurists believed it extended to being caught in the place of the theft with the thing, and no further. Julian (jurist), Ulpian, and Justinian all described it as including the thief who was still carrying the thing to its intended hiding place. There may have been a maximum time limit on manifest theft of this type, but it is unclear how long it was. The general rules for furtum were almost fully developed by the classical period and few significant changes were made during and after it.

There were now four possible actions for theft, by the victim: the action furti itself and three complementary actions. The actio furti concepti was available against the occupier of the building in which the stolen goods were found, regardless of his knowledge of them and brought three-times damages. The actio furti prohibiti could be pursued against anyone who declined a search with witnesses, with four-times damages. The actio furti non exhibiti could be brought if the respondent did not bring the thing to court, although its penalty is unclear. There was a further action available to the respondent of an actio furti concepti who had been found liable: he could sue the person who gave it to him, for the extent of his own liability. That the victim could sue both the thief and handler, if he could show who the thief was, which would have difficult without the presence of the thing. This was both penal, and an attempt to give the plaintiff enough actions to compensate him, because the thief, at least was not usually solvent.

By Justinian's time, the scheme was simpler: instead of complementing actions for manifest and non-manifest theft, handling stolen goods, or concealing them made one instead liable for non-manifest theft, whose two-times penalty was maintained. Searches were carried out by public authorities, and the wide definition of theft covered a bad faith receiver of goods.

There were reipersecutory actions available in addition to penal actions, those actions which followed from a finding of theft but were additional to it. An action for furtum allowed the dominus or his heirs a claim under vindicatio (and action in rem), which would result in the thing being returned if its value could not be paid instead. It also allowed a claim by the owner for the thing’s value under the condictio furtiva against the thief in personam, although only one could be successful. Allowing a condictio was anomalous: it was an action more usually brought by a non-owner, possibly kept over from before condictio was restricted in this way. It is also possible it was allowed because it granted to the claimant an advantage insofar as he did not need ascertain who had the property itself. Gaius suggests that it was kept "out of hatred for thieves". A possessory interdict was another option in either case.
