= Iniuria =

Delict in Roman law

Iniuria ("outrage", "contumely") was a delict in Roman law for the outrage, or affront, caused by contumelious action (whether in the form of words or deeds) taken against another person.

== Form ==
Justinian, following Paul, gives many senses in which the word inuria is used, with the Greek equivalent in each case. It might mean unlawful action, as in damnum iniuria datum; it might mean any unlawful interference with right; it might mean an unjust judgment, but, as a special delict, it meant contumelia, insult or outrage, represented in Greek by ὕβρις (hubris).

The Twelve Tables contained provisions against a certain number of forms of insult, probably only assaults, usually subjecting them to a fixed money penalty. This crude system, limited in scope and inflicting penalties which with changes in the value of money had become derisory in the later Republic, was then superseded in practice by a series of praetorian edicts. The first, which came to be known later as "generate edictum" and probably was designed to deal only with the acts contemplated by the XII Tables, provided in terms which, as we know them, cover any form of iniuria, that an actio in factum would lie, in which the plaintiff must specify the nature of the iniuria complained of and the damages he claimed, the case to be tried by recuperatores who would fix the amount of the condemnatio. The next dealt with convicium, public insult, and there followed other edicts extending the scope of the action. These edicts expressed a profound change in the conception of the wrong, an evolution assisted by the very general form of the edictum generate, which lent itself to juristic interpretation, so that, in the law as we know it, the wrong consisted in outrage or insult or wanton interference with rights, any act. in short, which shewed contempt of the personality of the victim or was of a nature to lower him in the estimation of others, and was so intended. All that was needed was that the act be insulting in kind and intention, and unjustified. Not only the actual insulter was liable but any accomplice, even one who did no more than encourage the offender.

The evolution was somewhat interrupted by a lex Cornelia de iniuriis of the time of Sulla, which provided a criminal or quasi-criminal remedy for "pulsare, verberare, vi domum introire" (covering the whole field of the iniuriae dealt with in the XII Tables), and apparently some other proceedings. It is held, on one view, that this legislation excluded these wrongs from the ordinary actio aestimatoria iniuriarum, till late in the classical age, when a rescript of Septimius Severus and Caracalla restored the right to bring a civil action in such cases. But the view that the two remedies existed side by side is also held.

The action was in a special sense "vindictam spirans". It rested not on economic loss but on outraged feelings; hence some characteristic rules. Like other delictal actions it did not lie against the heres of the wrongdoer, but, contrary to the general rule, it could not be brought by the heirs of the injured person. It lay only within a year of the event, and, as it rested on outraged feelings, it did not lie unless there was evidence of anger at the outset (dissimulatione aboletur). As it had nothing to do with property the damages were measured according to the position of the parties, and the grossness of the outrage. It was no defence that the defendant did not know the plaintiff, or mistook him for someone else, except that if the defendant had supposed him to be a paterfamilias or a widow no action lay for the insult to the actual paterfamilias or widow. But in the case of allegations, the truth of the statement was a complete defence.

The iniuria need not be directly to the person aggrieved; it is plain that A might be insulted by something done to B. But the important cases of this are of outrage to members of the family. An iniuria to a wife gave an action not only to her but to her husband. An insult to a filiusfamilias was an insult to the paterfamilias as well, who might sue for himself and for his son, though, as in certain circumstances the son might himself sue, there was a provision against two actions nomine filii. Thus where a married daughter of the family was insulted there might be three actions, or more, her own, her husband's, her father's, and even her husband's father's. A sponsus might have an action on an insult to his sponsa, and there were other cases. The damages would not necessarily be the same in these cases: in each the personality of the plaintiff was considered. And though an insult to wife or child was an insult to paterfamilias, the converse was not true. The most remarkable case of indirect insult is that of heredes. An insult to the body or funeral was an insult to the heres if it was the heres had entered into the estate. If not, it was an insult to the hereditas and the heres after entry acquired it like other claims of the hereditas.

== Iniuria to a slave ==
Iniuria to a slave was the subject of elaborate rules. For verberatio or submitting to torture, without justification, an action lay without proof of intent to insult the master. This was in the name of the slave. But the master brought the action; on what principle the damages were assessed we do not know, or whether they were in peculio – into the peculium of the slave. In general no action lay unless the iniuria was atrox; if it was, and was intended to insult the master, there was an actio domini nomine. If no such intent was proved an action lay in the name of the slave, but it was still really on account of the master; such a thing did insult him, though the edict governing it said nothing of intent to insult the master. It did not pass on alienation of the slave.

If there were several masters all of them might have an action, and the damages would vary, not with their share, but with their position. But in no case of iniuria to a slave, apart from verberatio, etc., was the action a matter of course: it was given causa cognita. If there were less rights in the slave, e.g. usufruct, the fructuary might have an action, but the iniuria was prima facie presumed to be to the owner. So too a bona fide possessor might have it, and, if the man was really free, both might have it.

== Atrox iniuria ==
A distinction between "atrox" and ordinary iniuria frequently recurs. As the question, which it was, was probably left to the praetor, it is likely that the distinction was not very exactly drawn. We are told in varying terms that it might be atrox ex re (or facto) from its extreme nature, or ex persona, the person insulted being one to whom special respect was due (e.g. the patron, or a magistrate), or ex loco, where it was very public. The chief results of the insult being classed "atrocitas" were that an action would lie on insult to a slave, and that the damages were differently estimated. In general the plaintiff fixed his maximum claim by a taxatio, which the iudex could cut down. In atrox iniuria the praetor fixed the maximum, usually at a higher rate, and the iudex did not interfere with it.

== Other remedies ==
In many cases there were criminal remedies for iniuria, in increasing number. In later law an extraordinarium indicium for punishment was always available as an alternative, which would be used where the defendant was without means, and was evidently sometimes used in other cases of extreme insult. Whichever way the matter was tried, condemnation involved infamia.
