= Robert Wright, Baron Wright =

British judge (1869–1964)

The Right Honourable The Lord Wright GCMG PC FBA
- Wright in 1925

Master of the Rolls
- In office 7 October 1935 – 26 April 1937
- Preceded by: The Lord Hanworth
- Succeeded by: The Lord Greene

Personal details
- Born: Robert Alderson Wright; 15 October 1869 South Shields, County Durham
- Died: 27 June 1964 (aged 94) Durley House, Burbage, Wiltshire
- Spouse: Marjory Avis Bullows (d. 1980)
- Education: Trinity College, Cambridge
- Profession: Barrister, judge

Robert Alderson Wright, Baron Wright, GCMG, PC, FBA (15 October 1869 – 27 June 1964) was a British judge. A commercial barrister, he was a Justice of the High Court from 1925 to 1932, when he was directly promoted to the House of Lords as a law lord. Robert Stevens described him as "one of the few significant British appeal judges of the twentieth century."

== Early life and career ==
Born in South Shields, the son of John Wright, a marine superintendent, and his wife, Elizabeth Middleton (née Carr), he was educated at the town's Union British School in Waterloo Vale. He then worked with his father until 1893 when he went to Trinity College, Cambridge, where he took a First and was elected to a prize fellowship which he held from 1899-1905. He was called to the bar in 1900 by the Inner Temple and practiced at the commercial bar, having joined the chambers of Thomas Edward Scrutton. He also lectured on industrial law at the London School of Economics. He took silk in 1917.

At the 1923 General election, he stood as the Liberal candidate in the Darlington constituency. The Liberals, who had not contested the seat at the previous election, were not expected to win and he came last. He did not stand for Parliament again.

== Judicial career ==
In 1925, Wright was appointed to the High Court (King's Bench Division) as a judge, receiving the customary knighthood. On 11 April 1932, he was appointed Lord of Appeal in Ordinary and was created additionally a life peer with the title Baron Wright, of Durley in the County of Wiltshire. His translation from the High Court directly to the House of Lords was unusual, and was masterminded by the Lord Chancellor, the Viscount Sankey. However, he resigned as Lord of Appeal in 1935. becoming instead Master of the Rolls, a post he held until 1937, when he was made Lord of Appeal in Ordinary again. He retired in 1947, and was appointed GCMG in 1948.

In 1945 he was the Chairman of the United Nations War Crimes Commission.

== Cases ==
=== As a trial judge ===
- Bell v Lever Brothers Ltd, in which he was reversed by the House of Lords.
- Rex v Wallace [1931] 23 Cr App R 32, A famous murder case, the verdict being overturned on appeal.
- R v Kylsant & Otrs, known as the Royal Mail Case.

=== As an appellate judge ===
- Hillas & Co v Arcos [1932] UKHL 2
- The Liesbosch v The Edison (1933) 'The law cannot take account of everything that follows a wrongful act'
- Lindsey County Council v Marshall (1936)
- Wilsons & Clyde Coal Co Ltd v English (1937) give due regard to the actual conditions under which men work in a factory or mine, at the long hours and the fatigue, to the slackening of attention which naturally comes from constant repetition of the same operation, to the noise and confusion in which the man works, to his preoccupation in what he is actually doing at the cost perhaps of some inattention to his own safety.
- Grant v Australian Knitting Mills [1936] AC 85
- With v O'Flanagan [1936] Ch 575
- Attorney-General for Canada v Attorney-General for Ontario (1937), where a panel chaired by Lord Atkin struck down the Canadian New Deal, including the federal social security system and the minimum wage, as he later admitted, Wright dissented. (At that time dissents could not be recorded publicly.) Canada then abandoned appeals to London.
- Spense v Crawford (1939)
- Lowry v Consolidated African Selection Trust Ltd [1940] AC 648, directors' duty to get best price for shares
- Southern Foundries (1926) Ltd v Shirlaw [1940] AC 701
- Luxor (Eastborne) Ltd v Cooper (1940) 'the duty of the court is to construe such documents fairly and broadly, without being too astute or subtle in finding defects'
- Liversidge v Anderson (1941), while Atkin dissented over the suspension of habeas corpus.
- Rickards v Forestal Land, Timber and Railways Co Ltd [1941] 3 All ER 62, HL, restraint of princes and the distinction between loss of goods and loss of venture
- Joseph Constantine SS Line Ltd v Imperial Smelting Corp (1941)
- Crofter Hand Woven Harris Tweed Co v Veitch [1942] AC 435, a famous statement that workers have the right to strike in support of their interests and to engage in collective bargaining.
- Muir v. Glasgow Corporation, in which he helped clarify the principle of negligence by saying that a duty of care was only breached if somebody did something which was "obviously and inherently dangerous": as the case revolved around a tea-urn, he made the amusing remark that "to introduce a savage animal such as a lion or tiger would be obviously and inherently dangerous, but not a tea-urn"
- Fibrosa Spolka Akcyjna v Fairbairn Lawson Combe Barbour Ltd [1943] AC 32, 61, recognising the basis of unjust enrichment. "It is clear that any civilised system of law is bound to provide remedies for cases of what has been called unjust enrichment or unjust benefit, that is to prevent a man from retaining the money of or some benefit derived from another which it is against conscience that he should keep."
- Joyce v DPP [1946] AC 347, the appeal of William Joyce, aka Lord Haw-Haw, against his conviction of Adherence to the King's enemies without the realm under the Treason Act 1351.

== Arms ==
Coat of arms of Robert Wright, Baron Wright
Crest In front of a Demi-Dragon Or the wings semée of Fleur-de-lis Azure a Fasces fesswise Sable Escutcheon Azure on a Fess between three Eagles' Heads couped Or a Pale between two Fleurs-de-lis of the first the pale charged with a Fleur-de-lis of the second. Supporters On either side a Pegasus Argent the Wings Or semée of Fleurs-de-lis Azure Motto Mens aequa

Legal offices
Preceded by Sir Ernest Pollock	Master of the Rolls; 1935–1937	Succeeded by Sir Wilfred Greene
