= AGS van Suid-Afrika v Capes =

South African legal case

Apostoliese Geloofsending van Suid-Afrika (Maitland Gemeente) v Capes is an important case in South African property law, especially in respect of the application of estoppel, in its limitation of the rei vindicatio, to immovable property. It was heard in the Cape Provincial Division by Friedman R from 1 November 1977, to 10 February 1978, with judgment handed down on 12 May.

The case involved a boundary dispute. Apostoliese Geloofsending van Suid-Afrika (AGS), the owner of two lots, had built a wall between them, but not exactly on the boundary. It later sold one lot to "J," who in turn transferred it to Capes, the defendant. AGS then sought an order to demolish the wall, so as to make use of all the property, but Capes opposed the action, claiming estoppel. The court allowed the plea of estoppel to succeed, holding that it may be applied to claims involving immovable property.
