= Administrateur, Natal v Trust Bank van Africa Bpk =

South African legal case

Administrateur, Natal v Trust Bank van Africa Bpk is an important case in South African law of delict, in particular in the area of negligent misstatements. It was heard in the Appellate Division on March 5, 1979, with judgment handed down on May 25, 1979.

The court found that the Afrikaans term nalatige wanvoorstelling, a translation of "negligent misrepresentation," does not reflect, in connection with negligent misrepresentation as a delictual ground of action, the essential problem in South African law; it created instead the impression of a representation in a contractual context. In a contractual context, "misrepresentation" has a somewhat legal-technical meaning. It must be, for example, a representation of an existing fact; therefore, it does not normally embrace the expression of an opinion or the giving of advice, which requirement is not necessarily applicable to a "negligent misrepresentation." The court suggested that perhaps the expression nalatige wanbewering ("negligent misstatement") should rather be used, but that, if "negligent misrepresentation" was retained, this caveat ought to be borne in mind.

The court found it could accept, from what different writers had written on the subject, that the right to compensation for pure patrimonial loss was recognized in the Roman law in certain limited cases, although this right was still relative to a thing or a corpus. It could also accept that in the Roman-Dutch law compensation for pure patrimonial loss was awarded in certain cases, indicating that Aquilian liability was extended beyond the Roman-law boundary of damage to property. In whatever manner the decisions of the different judges in the Appellate Division in Herschel v Mrupe were interpreted, it appeared to the court to be clear that the existence of such a right in South African law had not been rejected by the Appellate Division; on the contrary, it was recognized. The unsatisfactory state of affairs which had existed in South African law since the Herschel case, the differing judgments in provincial divisions subsequent thereto, and the attitude of both the appellant and the respondent in the Appellate Division in the present case that such a right exists, were sound reasons, the court found, for a judgment now to be given recognising or rejecting the existence of such a right in the common law. The birthpangs of such a right of action had endured so long, the court held, that the time had arrived, perhaps even with a Caesarean section, to bring the child into the world. Pursuing the metaphor, the court foretold that it would be a problem child, but that, with the necessary love and especially discipline, it could play a useful role in legal life.

The court found that the ground of action for damages for negligent misstatement could and ought to be placed in the extended range of application of the lex Aquilia. From this it followed, according to prevailing norms, that unlawfulness also was required, as well as a guilty mind. The fear of so-called "limitless liability" could only be allayed if in every given case it was the task of the court to decide whether, in the particular circumstances, there was a legal duty resting on the defendant not to make a misstatement to the plaintiff, and also whether the defendant, in light of all the circumstances, exercised reasonable care (inter alia, in determining the correctness or truth of his representation). In the absence of a legal duty, then, there is no unlawfulness. The court also undertook to keep the ground of action within reasonable limits by giving proper attention to the nature of the misstatement and the interpretation thereof, and by giving proper attention to the problem of causation.

In South African law, the court stressed, liability for negligent misstatement arises only as a delictual liability, outside a contractual context.

The decision in the Natal Provincial Division, in Administrator, Natal v Bijo and Another was thus confirmed.
