= 286 (disambiguation) =

286 may refer to:

- The year 286
- The year 286 BC
- 286 (number)
- Intel 80286, a microprocessor
- 2-8-6, a locomotive wheel arrangement
- 286 Iclea, a main-belt asteroid
- 286, Southampton, a building
