= With v O'Flanagan =

English contract law case

With v O’Flanagan
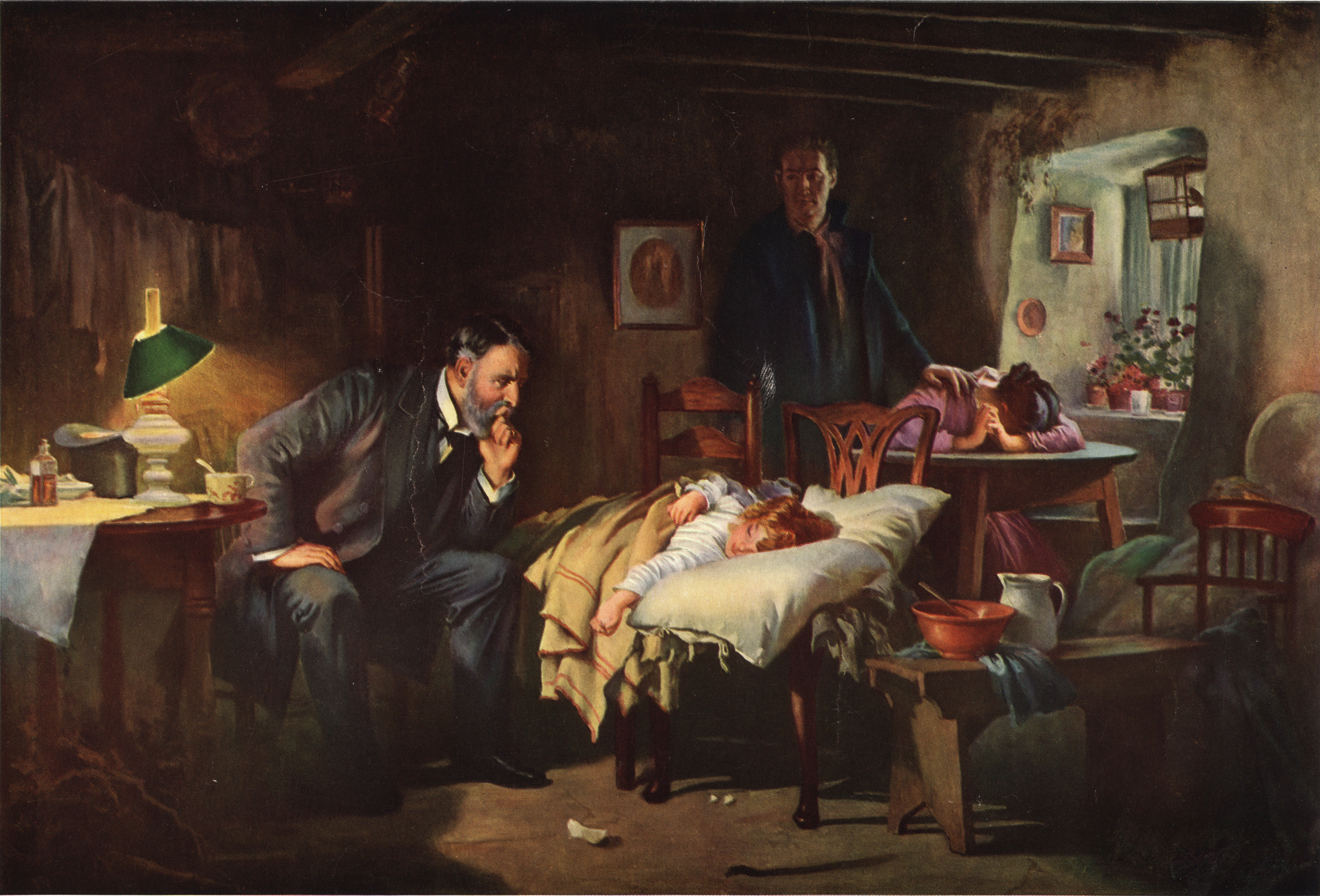
- Court: Court of Appeal
- Citation: [1936] Ch 575

Keywords
- Misrepresentation, good faith

With v O’Flanagan [1936] Ch 575 is an English contract law case, concerning misrepresentation. It holds that there is a duty to disclose material changes in circumstances that were represented to be true in negotiations.

== Facts ==
Dr O’Flanagan said truthfully in January 1934 that his medical practice had takings of £2,000 per annum. However, in May, the takings were only £5 a week because O’Flanagan had become ill. The contract was signed with Mr With to buy the medical practice, but Dr O’Flanagan did not disclose the change in circumstances (namely that Dr O’Flanagan was ill and there was a severe drop in the income of the medical practice).

At trial, the judge held that because the contract was not made uberrimae fidei (in ultimate good faith). Where a statement is rendered false by a change in circumstances, there is a duty to disclose the change. A failure to do so will result in an actionable misrepresentation

== Judgment ==
Lord Wright MR held that Mr With could rescind either because there was a duty to point out the change in circumstance or because the representation continued till the point when the contract was signed. He referred to Fry J in Davies v London Provincial Marine Insurance that there is no duty to disclose, even when someone believes facts to be operating on another’s mind. He noted fiduciary relationships can bring an entire duty of disclosure. Uberrimae fidei contracts, including partnership and marine insurance, do too. But also where in negotiations a statement is false and then the representor discovers it, though if he had said nothing he is entitled to hold his tongue throughout. He noted that a ‘representation made as a matter of inducement to enter a contract is to be treated as a continuing representation.’

Romer LJ stated,

I agree. The only principle invoked by the appellants in this case is as follows. If A, with a view to inducing B to enter into a contract makes a representation as to a material fact, then if at a later date and before the contract is actually entered into, owing to a change of circumstances, the representation then made would to the knowledge of A be untrue, and B subsequently enters into the contract in ignorance of that change of circumstances and relying upon that representation, A cannot hold B to the bargain. There is ample authority for that statement and, indeed, I doubt myself whether any authority is necessary, it being, it seems to me, so obviously consistent with the plainest principles of equity.

Clauson J concurred.

== Significance ==
This affirms a general principle that any change to a fundamental reason for contracting (supervening falsification) must be communicated, where it is known to one party. It does not matter what the reason or motive is for not communicating is, it need not be malicious or fraudulent, but merely known to the representor.

== See also ==
- English contract law
- Misrepresentation in English law
- Brownlie v Campbell 5 AC 925, 950, Lord Blackburn,

"when a statement or representation has been made in the bonâ fide belief that it is true, and the party who has made it afterwards comes to find out that it is untrue, and discovers what he should have said, he can no longer honestly keep up that silence on the subject after that has come to his knowledge, thereby allowing the other party to go on, and still more, inducing him to go on, upon a statement which was honestly made at the time when it was made, but which he has not now retracted when he has become aware that it can be no longer honestly persevered in."
