= Grant v Australian Knitting Mills =

Judgement of the High Court of Australia

Australian Knitting Mills Limited v Grant
- Court: High Court of Australia
- Full case name: Australian Knitting Mills Ltd and John Martin & Co v Grant
- Decided: 18 August 1933
- Citations: [1933] HCA 35, (1933) 50 CLR 387

Case history
- Prior actions: Grant v John Martin & Co and Australian Knitting Mills Limited [1933] SAStRp 3, [1935] SASR 457

Court membership
- Judges sitting: Starke, Dixon, Evatt and McTiernan JJ

Grant v Australian Knitting Mills
- Court: Privy Council
- Decided: 21 October 1935
- Citations: [1935] UKPC 62, [1936] AC 85; [1935] UKPCHCA 1, (1935) 54 CLR 49

Court membership
- Judges sitting: Viscount Hailsham LC, Lord Blanesburgh, Lord Macmillan, Lord Wright Sir Lancelot Sanderson

Grant v Australian Knitting Mills is a landmark case in consumer and negligence law from 1935, holding that where a manufacturer knows that a consumer may be injured if the manufacturer does not take reasonable care, the manufacturer owes a duty to the consumer to take that reasonable care. It continues to be cited as an authority in legal cases, and is used as an example for students studying law.

== Background ==
In the 19th century, an action for negligence was only available if there was a particular relationship between the injured person and the person said to be negligent. The most common founding of the relationship was that of contract, but only where both people were party to the same contract, referred to as privity of contract. Thus in Winterbottom v Wright, Winterbottom had a contract with the Postmaster-General to drive a mail coach, while Wright had a contract with the Postmaster-General to maintain the mail coach. Wright performed his contract negligently and a wheel fell off the coach and Winterbottom was injured. The Court of Exchequer held that because Winterbottom and Wright were not parties to the same contract, such that Wright had no liability in negligence. There was no privity of contract where goods were sold by an intermediary, or where the goods were bought on behalf of another. There were some exceptions, such as Langridge v Levy where the seller fraudulently misrepresented that the gun was safe, knowing that the gun was bought on behalf of the buyers son, and George v Skivington where a chemist negligently compounded a bottle of hair shampoo, knowing it was to be used by the plaintiff's wife. In 1932 the law of negligence however was radically altered by the House of Lords in the decision of Donoghue v Stevenson, where Lord Atkin held that the particular relationships that had hitherto been held to give rise to a duty of care were but instances of a general rule that a person owed a duty of care who ought reasonably have been contemplated as being closely and directly affected by the actions.

=== Facts ===
In June 1931 Dr Grant purchased two pairs of woollen underwear and two singlets from John Martin's There was nothing to say the underwear should be washed before wearing and Dr Grant did not do so. He suffered a skin irritation within nine hours of first wearing them. Dr Grant applied calamine lotion, but continued to wear the underwear for the rest of the week. He then wore the second pair for the next week and washed the first pair. This was in an era when changing his underwear only once a week was "the ordinary custom of ordinary people". The skin irritation got worse and developed into a severe case of dermatitis. Dr Grant blamed the underwear and sued John Martin & Co. for breach of contract, being the statutory warranties that the goods were fit for the purpose and were of merchantable quality. Dr Grant also sued the manufacturer, Australian Knitting Mills, alleging that they had been negligent in failing to take reasonable care in the preparation of the garments. The garments in question were alleged to contain an excess of sulphur compounds, variously described as sulphur dioxide and sulphites.

=== Supreme Court of South Australia ===
The case was heard in the Supreme Court of South Australia before Murray CJ over 20 days in November and December 1932 . The issues to be determined in the case were whether the underwear caused Dr Grant's dermatitis, whether Dr Grant relied on the salesman's skill & judgment, giving rise to the statutory warranty the underwear was fit for purpose, and the extent of the manufacturer's duty of care to the ultimate consumer. Murray CJ accepted evidence that the dermatitis was caused by exposure to sulphur compounds, and that the sulphur compounds were on the underwear from the scouring, bleaching and shrinking processes. Murray CJ held that the retailer was liable under the statutory warranty because Grant had asked for woollen underwear and relied on the salesman's skill in selecting the "golden fleece" brand manufactured by Australian Knitting Mills. The Sale of Goods Act, was founded on the existence of a contract and did not apply to the claim against the manufacturer. Murray CJ applied the landmark decision of Donoghue v Stevenson, which had been decided by the House of Lords less than 12 months previously, holding that the manufacturer owed a duty of care to the consumer because (1) it intended the underwear would reach the consumer for wear in the same condition as when it left the manufacturer, (2) there was no reasonable possibility of testing for the presence of sulphur compounds and (3) Australian Knitting Mills knew that the absence of reasonable care in the preparation of the garments would result in an injury to the purchaser's health. The judgment does not articulate what a reasonable manufacturer would have done differently. Dr Grant was awarded £2,450 in damages.

=== High Court ===
Australian Knitting Mills and John Martin & Co appealed to the High Court, where the case was heard over a further 6 days. The majority, Starke, Dixon and McTiernan JJ, upheld the appeal.

Starke J agreed with the findings of Murray CJ that (1) the manufacturing process was the source of some of the sulphur content, but it was not possible to determine the proportion, and (2) the dermatitis was caused by sulphur compounds in the garments. Starke J however upheld the appeal, finding that Australian Knitting Mills was not negligent as it adopted a process that was prudent and reasonable. Starke J held that it was unreasonable to expect John Martin & Co to exercise skill and judgement that the goods were free from irritant chemicals when they had no means of detecting the sulphur compounds.

Dixon J noted that, on one view the test from Donoghue v Stevenson was limited to circumstances where the manufacturer had excluded interference with or examination of the goods, whilst the other view was that it was sufficient if the manufacturer intended the consumer to receive the article as it left the manufacturer. Dixon J did not determine which view was correct, instead holding that the evidence did not establish that the underwear had the sulphur compounds of such a strength so as to have caused Dr Grant's dermatitis. McTiernan J, as he tended to do, agreed with Dixon J, in this case writing a short concurring judgement.

Evatt J dissented, holding that Dr Grant's dermatitis was caused by sulphur compounds and that the manufacturer had failed to fully or completely carry out its washing process. Evatt J dismissed the contention that there was no "special relationship" between the manufacturer and consumer, noting that the manufacturer provided a "guarantee" to the purchaser that the garments would not shrink if washed in accordance with its directions.

One of the issues was whether specific identified goods were goods "bought by description" within the meaning of the Sales of Goods Act. Dixon J, McTiernan J agreeing, and Evatt J, held that because they were described by Dr Grant as woollen underclothing, the goods were bought by description, even though he was shown specific items.

=== Arguments ===
The hearing before the Privy Council lasted 9 days, bringing the total hearing days to 35. Grant was represented by G.P Glanfield, and argued that the manufacturer's duty was to render the garment safe, in terms reflecting a strict liability rather than a duty to take reasonable care. Australian Knitting Mills and John Martin & Co were represented by Wilfred Greene KC, and the Australian barrister Wilbur Ham KC, who had represented them before the High Court and had made the journey to London for the hearing. The headnote writer in the authorised reports of Donoghue v Stevenson expressed the duty of care as being confined to ‘the manufacturer of an article of food, medicine or the like’, an argument that was adopted for Australian Knitting Mills in seeking to distinguish the case from one in which an item of clothing was to be worn externally. The other way in which they sought to distinguish Donoghue v Stevenson the sealed bottle intentionally excluded interference with or examination of the ginger beer before it reached the consumer, whereas the clothing bought by Dr Grant "might be handled and inspected by others before reaching the" consumer.

== Privy Council ==
At the time there was no provision for dissent or separate judgments in the Privy Council. Instead the advice to the King was determined by a majority of judges who heard the appeal and one judge would be chosen to write the judgment. Decisions of the Privy Council tended to be expressed on narrow grounds, a tendency attributed to the need to reflect the agreement of the majority of judges. Lord Wright delivered the judgment of the Privy Council and identified the aspects of the decision in Donoghue v Stevenson in which the majority, Lord Thankerton, Lord Macmillan and Lord Atkin had agreed, as being the statement by Lord Atkin that:

A manufacturer of products, which he sells in such a form as to show that he intends them to reach the ultimate consumer in the form in which they left him with no reasonable possibility of intermediate examination, and with the knowledge that the absence of reasonable care in the preparation or putting up of the products will result in an injury to the consumer's life or property, owes a duty to the consumer to take that reasonable care.

The Privy Council rejected the attempts to distinguish Donoghue v Stevenson, stating "No distinction however, can be logically drawn for this purpose between a noxious thing taken internally and a noxious thing applied externally", and that "The decision in Donoghue's Case did not depend on the bottle being stoppered and sealed: the essential point in this regard was that the article should reach the consumer or user subject to the same defect as it had when it left the manufacturer."

The judgment took a narrow approach to its expression of the duty of care, limiting it to (1) manufacturers of goods, (2) the presence of deleterious chemicals could not be detected by any examination that could reasonably be made by the consumer, and (3) the risk is known to the manufacturer and unknown to the consumer.

An appellant who seeks to disturb a decision as to the facts must show the decision was wrong, having regard to the advantage of the trial judge of seeing and hearing the witnesses. In this case the Privy Council was not satisfied that the trial Judge was wrong. In relation to the manufacturers breach of the duty, the Privy Council held that "According to the evidence, the method of manufacture was correct: The danger of excess sulphites being left was recognised and guarded against: the process was intended to be fool proof. If excess sulphites were left in the garment, that could only be because someone was at fault".

Dr Grant was held to have relied upon the skill and judgment of the retailer that the garments were fit for wearing, with the Privy Council saying:

It is clear that the reliance must be brought home to the mind of the seller, expressly or by implication. The reliance will seldom be express: it will usually arise by implication from the circumstances: thus to take a case like that in question, of a purchase from a retailer, the reliance will be in general inferred from the fact that a buyer goes to the shop in the confidence that the tradesman has selected his stock with skill and judgment: the retailer need know nothing about the process of manufacture: it is immaterial whether he be manufacturer or not: the main inducement to deal with a good retail shop is the expectation that the tradesman will have bought the right goods of a good make: the goods sold must be, as they were in the present case, goods of a description which it is in the course of the seller's business to supply: there is no need to specify in terms the particular purpose for which the buyer requires the goods, which is none the less the particular purpose within the meaning of the section, because it is the only purpose for which any one would ordinarily want the goods. In this case the garments were naturally intended, and only intended, to be worn next the skin.

Thus the Privy Council upheld the appeal, finding that the decision of the Supreme Court of South Australia was correct in finding that both the manufacturer, Australian Knitting Mills, and the retailer, John Martin & Co, were liable to the plaintiff.
