= Wilsons & Clyde Coal Co Ltd v English =

1937 UK legal case

Wilsons and Clyde Coal Ltd v English
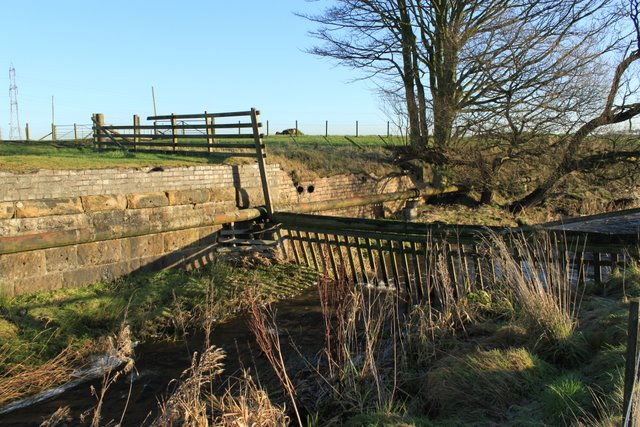
- Court: House of Lords
- Decided: 19 July 1937
- Citations: [1937] UKHL 2, [1938] AC 57, [1937] UKHL 2, [1937] 3 All ER 628

Court membership
- Judges sitting: Lord Atkin, Lord Thankerton, Lord Macmillan, Lord Wright and Lord Maugham

Keywords
- Health and safety, implied terms

Wilsons and Clyde Coal Ltd v English [1937] UKHL 2 is a UK labour law case concerning the employer's duty to provide a safe system of work for all its employees.

== Facts ==
Mr English was employed at Wilsons & Clyde Coal Co Ltd's colliery at Glencraig from 27 March 1933. He was repairing an airway leading off the Mine Jigger Brae, a main haulage road. Between 1:30pm and 2pm he was going to the pit bottom and the haulage plant was put in motion. He tried to escape through one of the manholes, but was caught by a rake of hutches and crushed between it and the side of the road. His family claimed damages. The company claimed that Mr English's own negligence contributed to his death, because he should have told the person in charge of the machinery, or taken an alternative route

== Judgment ==
The House of Lords held unanimously that an employer has a non-delegable duty to create a safe system of work. Even if an employer gives that duty to another person, they still remain accountable for workplace safety.

Lord Atkin said he concurred with the other Lordships, and particularly with opinions given by the ‘Lord President in this case, and by the Lord Justice-Clerk in Bain v Fife Coal Co on the English case of Fanton v Denville.

Lord Thankerton gave a longer judgment saying, ‘when a workman contracts to do work, he is not to be held as having agreed to hold the master immune from the latter’s liability for want of due care in the provision of a reasonably safe system of working.’

Lord Macmillan gave a short judgment concurring with Lord Thankerton, the Lord President in the present case and by Lord Justice-Clerk Aitchison.

Lord Wright gave a longer judgment.

Lord Maugham delivered a short concurring judgment.

== See also ==
- UK labour law
- Unfair dismissal
