= Condictio indebiti =

Legal action to recover what the plaintiff has mistakenly paid the defendant

In Roman law and the civil legal systems descending from it, the condictio indebiti is a legal action (condictio) whereby a plaintiff may recover what he has paid the defendant by mistake; such mistaken payment is known as solutio indebiti. This action does not lie

1. if the sum was due ex aequitate, or by a natural obligation;
2. if he who made the payment knew that nothing was due, for qui consulto dat quod non debet, praesumitur donare (who gives purposely what he does not owe, is presumed to make a gift).

The action is extant in civil (Roman) or hybrid law regimes, e.g. Norway, South Africa and Scotland.

== See also ==
- Condictio causa data causa non secuta

§ 812 I 1 1. Alt BGB (German Civil Code)
