= Infamy =

Notoriety gained from a negative incident or reputation

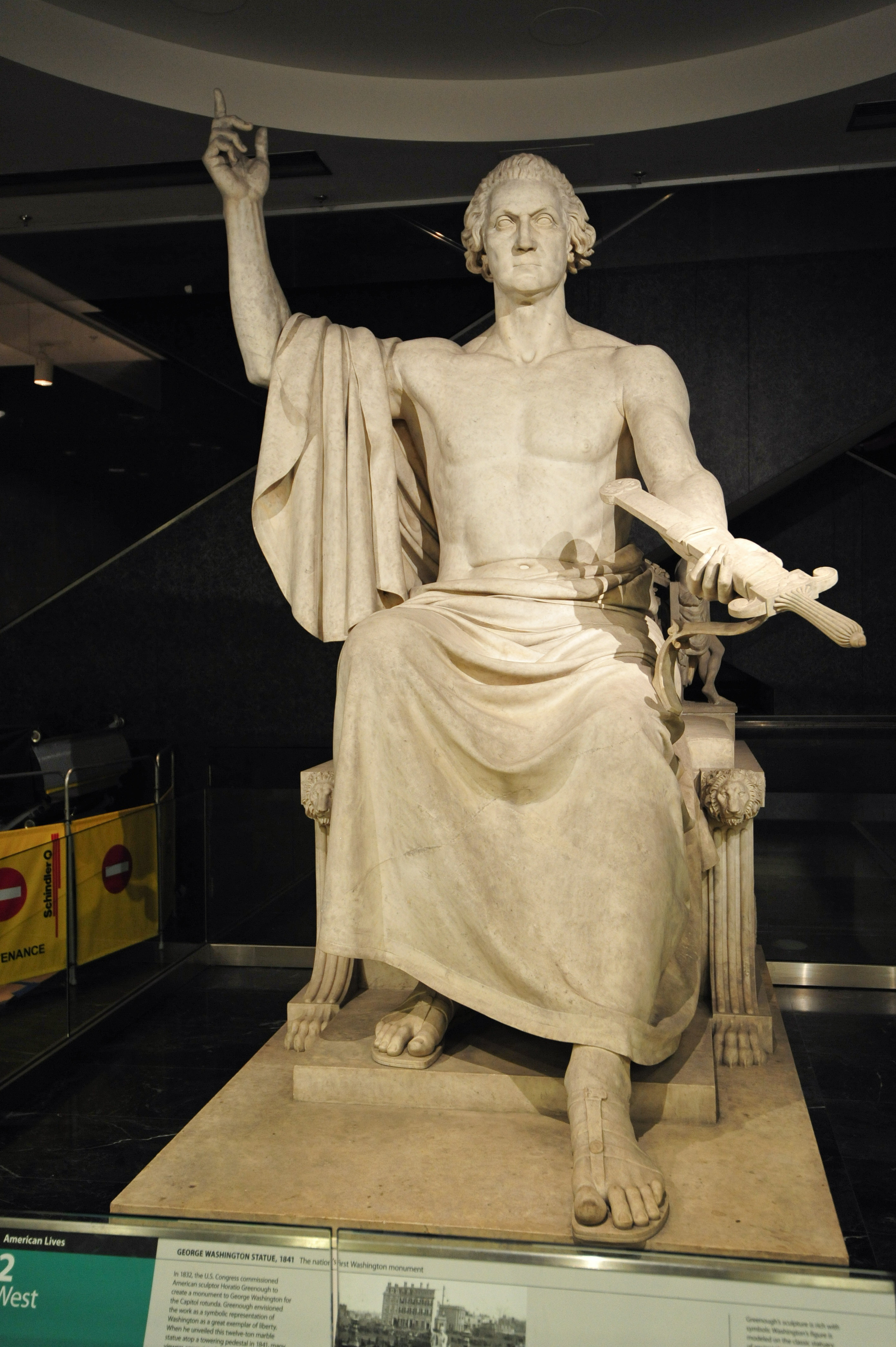
A statue of George Washington, in the Smithsonian. The bare chest was generally considered disrespectful of the great statesman, which earned it the epithet infamous.

Infamy is notoriety gained from actions considered dangerous, disrespectful, immoral, unethical, or otherwise perceived in a negative manner. An infamous person or organization is one considered to have said or done something that provokes public outrage, and often one who is considered blameworthy and deserving of punishment even if no sanction is actually applied. The term has been used in both secular and canon law in Europe since ancient times.

== Etymology ==
The word stems from the Latin infamia. It derives from the Negation in + fame which implies public acclaim for doing something that pleases the public. The Proto-Indo-European root of that word is *bhā- meaning to tell (as in blab or megaphone).

== Roman law ==
In Roman law, infamy was a form of censure on individuals pronounced by the censors on moral grounds, in which the censure was the result of certain actions they had committed which did not rise to the level of an actual crime, or for pursuing a lifestyle that was considered technically legal but nonetheless immoral. Such a censure involved disqualification for certain rights both in public and in private law.

== In canon law ==
Infamy is a term of art in Roman Catholic canon law. According to the Catholic Encyclopedia of 1913, infamy in the canonical sense is defined as the privation or lessening of one's good name as the result of the bad rating he has, even among prudent men. It constitutes an irregularity, a canonical impediment that prevents one being ordained or exercising such orders as he may have already received. There are two types of infamy: infamy of law (infamia juris) and infamy of fact (infamia facti).

=== Infamy of law ===
Infamy of law is contracted in one of three ways. Either the law itself attaches this juridical ineligibility and incapacity to the commission of certain crimes, or makes it contingent upon the decision of a judge, or finally connects it with the penalty imposed by the judge. This kind of infamy is incurred chiefly by those guilty of duelling (whether as principals or seconds), rape (as likewise those who co-operate in it), attempt to marry during the lifetime of the actual consort, heresy, real simony, etc. Infamy of law may be removed either by canonical purging or by application to the Holy See.

=== Infamy of fact ===
Infamy of fact is the result of a widespread opinion, by which the community attributes some unusually serious delinquency, such as adultery or the like, to a person. This is more of an unfitness than an irregularity properly so called, unless sentence in court has been pronounced. It ceases therefore when one has shown by a change of life extending over a period of two or probably three years that his repentance is sincere.

== Historical Polish law ==
In historical Polish law, including that of the Polish–Lithuanian Commonwealth, infamia developed in connection with two other institutions of criminal law: proskrypcja (proscription or outlawry) and banicja (a form of banishment). Its precise origins and meaning are difficult to establish because of inconsistencies in the terminology used in early legal sources and writings.

Proscription entailed complete outlawry, depriving the condemned person of legal personhood, public rights, and legal protection, effectively resulting in civil death. Their property passed to their relatives, and if apprehended, they were subject to the immediate execution of a previously imposed death sentence. By contrast, banicja was primarily used to compel individuals to appear before a court or comply with the enforcement of its judgments. It could be temporary or perpetual (bannitio perpetua). A banished person lost public and civil-law rights but retained their honour. If apprehended, they were to be imprisoned pending a decision about their further fate.

Infamia combined elements of both penalties. It involved the loss of noble honour, public rights, and the privileges associated with those rights, but did not deprive the condemned person of legal personality under private law. It could be imposed either in absentia or following proceedings in which the accused was present. In some circumstances, a person could become an infamis by operation of law, without a judicial sentence. According to legal historian Tomasz Adamczyk, the definition of infamia is necessarily somewhat provisional, since its meaning evolved over time and surviving historical sources do not allow for an entirely unambiguous interpretation. The penalty was also distinguished from exile and should not be equated with it.
