= Muir v Glasgow Corp =

Leading case in the development of the law of negligence

Muir v Glasgow Corporation 1943 SC(HL) 3, is a leading case in the development of the law of negligence and forms part of Scots delict law and English tort law. It embeds the concept of the reasonable person.

== Facts ==
A group of children were having a day out with their Sunday school. They were meant to be having a picnic, but the rain had ruined it. The leader of the trip asked the manager of a tearoom, run by Glasgow Corporation, if she would allow the children to have their picnic on their premises. She agreed and the group entered. In the tearoom there was a tuck shop, the window to which was located midway along a corridor. The children had all started to line up along the corridor to buy sweets at the tuck shop. At this time a large tea urn was being carried along the corridor by two adults, to the main room of the tearoom. For a reason which was not explained, the hold of one of the bearers slipped so that tea was spilt and scalded several children (Muir being one of them).

The parents of the girl sued Glasgow Corporation, claiming that they owed the child a duty of care and that they had breached this.

== Judgment ==
The court held that the manager in charge owed a duty of care, generally, to everyone in the tearoom. However, she did not owe a duty of care to the Sunday school, to take additional precautions to prevent their being injured as a result of her allowing them to enter. So long as the tearoom was run in the same manner as it was day to day, and to the same safety standards, she was not required to take extra steps to prevent the incident which occurred. It was not reasonably foreseeable that allowing the children to come into the premises would result in one of them being scalded. As such, the incident was put down as an accident which could not have been prevented.

Lord Macmillan said, "Legal liability is limited to those consequences of our acts which a reasonable man of ordinary intelligence and experience so acting would have in contemplation. "The duty to take care," as I essayed to formulate it in Bourhill v. Young, "is the duty to avoid doing or omitting to do anything the doing or omitting to do which may have as its reasonable and probable consequence injury to others, and the duty is owed to those to whom injury may reasonably and probably be anticipated if the duty is not observed." This, in my opinion, expresses the law of Scotland, and I apprehend that it is also the law of England."

Lord Macmillan spoke on the test for the reasonable man, saying, "The standard of foresight of the reasonable man is, in one sense, an impersonal test. It eliminates the personal equation and is independent of the idiosyncrasies of the particular person whose conduct is in question. Some persons are by nature unduly timorous and imagine every path beset with lions. Others, of more robust temperament, fail to foresee or nonchalantly disregard even the most obvious dangers. The reasonable man is presumed to be free both from over-apprehension and from over-confidence, but there is a sense in which the standard of care of the reasonable man involves in its application a subjective element. "

== See also ==
- Palsgraf v. Long Island Railroad Co., a similar New York law case.
