= Rapina =

Rapina (theft with violence) was a delict of Roman law.

== Form ==
This was erected into a special delict in the troubled times of the Roman Republic, and the rules became a permanent part of the law. The action was in factum and condemnation involved infamy. The penalty was fourfold, or rather, as this included the value of the thing, for threefold and compensation. As it was penal and praetorian, it was annua, but, as it covered compensation as well, perpetua as to the single value. Hence it was said to be mixta by some jurists and Justinian so decides, but it had the main characteristic of penal actions that it was not available against the heirs of the wrongdoer. As the act was furtum there would always be the condictio furtiva. The principles were in general those of actio furti. Thus it applied only to res mobiles in commercio and owned. The contrectatio must be fraudulosa.

On some points, however, there are slight signs of divergence. Thus we are told that what could be recovered was a multiple of the verum pretium, not of the interest the aggrieved had in the thing (interesse), but as one text tells us this of furtum also, the import is doubtful. Though in general those who could bring it were the same, one text, probably due to Justinian, says that any sort of interesse sufficed in this case; in classical law the rule of interesse was the same as in furtum. One text suggests that mere encouragement was enough to make a man liable for ope consilio, which is consistent with the genesis of the action. The action was a bar to actio furti and any action ad rem persequendam. Probably in classical law it was barred by actio furti, but under Justinian it was still available for any excess recoverable by it. It is plain that, in manifest theft, furti would be the better remedy, but not in other cases. It does not appear that the action could have been barred by vindicatio, at least as to threefold.

== Similar actions ==
This delict involved bad faith, but violent enforcement of claims, even in good faith, needed repression. Such conduct had been criminal from the Republic, and Marcus Aurelius provided that one who seized property to satisfy a claim, without judicial process, should forfeit his claim. In A.D. 389 it was provided that one who seized property under a bona fide claim of right should, if the claim was well founded, forfeit his right, and if it was unfounded should give back the property and its value as well. This penalty applied to land as well as moveables. The actions by which these rules were enforced were no doubt ordinary proprietary actions, at any rate so far as the forfeiture of property was concerned. Whether, where the claim was well founded, the heres of the wrongdoer was equally liable does not appear; presumably he was not, and he could hardly have been liable to penalty in the other case.
