= Damnum iniuria datum =

Damnum iniuria datum was a delict of Roman law relating to the wrongful damage to property. It was created by the lex Aquilia in the third century BC, and consisted of two parts: chapter one, which dealt with the killing of another's slave or certain types of animal; and chapter three which related to other types of property. It was widely extended both by reference to the words of the statute themselves and by the Praetor.

Like similar concepts in the modern law, it had to deal with changes in the way negligence was dealt with, issues of omission, and those of causation.

== Basic form ==
Damnum iniuria datum can be considered wrongful damage to property. The law of the Empire on this topic is mainly based on the lex Aquilia, of which the date is uncertain, but earlier than the introduction of the contract of mandate. It does not seem that, as the Institutes rather suggest, and the Digest actually says, it superseded earlier provisions as matter of law, but it was of overwhelming practical importance and seems to have swamped them. On the other hand there was praetorian legislation on the matter, apart from extensions of this statute. But it is plain that this law. with its extensions, was much the most important part of the scheme of remedies. The words damnum iniuria datum mean damage unlawfully caused, but we get the expression actio damni iniuriae.

The lex Aquilia contained, besides a penalty for adstipulatores who fraudulently released the debtor and, perhaps, a vaguely indicated procedure for multa as an alternative, in the case which does concern us, two important provisions for a civil remedy for damage to property. Its first chapter provided that anyone who unlawfully killed another's slave or beast within the class of pecus, was liable to pay the owner the highest value the thing had had within the previous year. Its third chapter provided that anyone who unlawfully damaged another's property in respects not the coming under the first chapter, by burning, breaking or destroying, was liable to pay him the value the thing had had within 30 days before. The period of time was reckoned back, not from the death, but from the injury. The third chapter did not, like the first, say the highest ("plurimi") value within the 30 days, but the lawyers read this in, in order to give the provision a meaning. So far as the main text goes a man who merely damaged the property had to pay the whole value, but, apart from the bad economics of such a rule, there is a text which implies that what he had to pay was the difference between the highest value and the value after the damage.

== Elements ==
The actio legis Aquiliae was a penal action with the ordinary consequence that it did not lie against the heres, except to the extent of his enrichment, that it was not extinguished by capitis deminutio, and that each of joint wrongdoers was liable in full. It was penal as to the whole of the damages and not merely as to the excess over the harm done, and as there often would be no such excess, it might, like the actio doli, be penal where what was paid was merely compensation. It was penal also in the sense that it was for double damages in case of denial, but this alone did not cause an action to be regarded as penal. The rule that it was duplex contra infitiantem, a result of the original manus iniectio, raises the question whether denial was of the facts or of liability. We are told that one who confesses the fact of killing could not afterwards deny liability, but might prove that the man was not dead, or died from natural causes. The text describes the action in which he has confessed the fact as confessoria.

The damage must be unlawful, but need not be wilful; negligence was enough. But the negligence must be active; mere omission did not suffice. Cases which look like exceptions, as of one who, having lit a fire, neglected to look after it, so that it spread to the next property, were cases in which an act was done with insufficient attention to consequences. The strongest case is that in which A lit a fire and B watched it negligently. B was liable. But he was not a casual passer without privity; he was one who had done something to make himself responsible. In most of the cases of this type the remedy was not the action itself, but a praetorian extension.

The negligence need not be extreme; slight negligence created the liability. This rule raises the question, where there was a contract between the parties in which culpa did not create liability, e.g. deposit, whether damage caused by negligence created the Aquilian liability. There is no decisive text and both views are held. The dominant opinion is that the liability existed.

Contributory negligence of the aggrieved person might be a defence. This is sometimes misleadingly called "culpa-compensation," which suggests both some sort of quantitative relation between them, and the notion of damage to the defendant by the plaintiff, neither of which notions has anything to do with the matter. The true principle is one of causal connexion. The causal nexus was broken if there intervened, between the culpa of the defendant and the damage, some other cause without which the damage would not have occurred. Where a man wounded another not mortally, who died in consequence of being neglected, he was liable for the wounding but not for the death. But if the original act was wilful it is generally held, though there is no explicit text, that intervening negligence of the injured person was no defence, though there was the same breach of causal nexus. The texts dealing with the case where the intervening event was a wrongful act of a third person present some difficulty, but their doctrine seems to be as follows: Where a slave, wounded by A and then by B, died, if each act would certainly have killed, A had wounded, B had killed. If several wounded and it was clear which killed, he alone was liable for the killing. If it was not made out that one killed, more than another, all were liable for killing. If it was clear that A's wound would have killed, but not clear whether B's would or not, apart from A's previous act, both were liable. But there is much controversy on this. It is generally held that the texts cannot be reconciled.

The statute was at first very narrowly construed. At one time it seems that it was inferred from the etymology of the word occido that the act must have been done directly by the person of the wrongdoer or a weapon held by him. But the early lawyers extended this to killing by, e.g., actually administering poison. The rule so understood was expressed in the words that it must be corpori corpore, by the wrongdoer's body to that of the injured thing. Another extension made at civil law by interpretatio, was to understand "rumpere" in the third chapter to mean "corrumpere", so that it covered any form of material damage and the other words became unimportant. Further, in construing the words "highest value" the jurists included what is called damnum emergens, loss due to extrinsic circumstances, and lucrum cessans, profit which the fact prevented the owner from making. The killing of one horse of a pair, of one of a troupe of actors, are instances of the first, as the loss was greater than the value of the thing as a single thing. The second is illustrated by loss of a hereditas on which the slave would have entered. But it must be a material loss: value of affection was not taken into account. Though the statute applied only to res mobiles, its application was extended to land.

Even so extended, the statute was extremely narrow.

== Praetorian extensions ==
It was left to the praetor to make further extensions, not of the action itself, but by providing analogous remedies for analogous cases.

Firstly, the lex applied only where the aggrieved person was the dominus. The praetor provided an actio utilis, or one in factum, to persons with lesser property rights in the thing, e.g. the usufructuary, alongside the owner. Damages would be based on the value of the interest. A bona fide possessor had the action for the full value, but if ultimately sued by the owner, must give up what he had recovered. Under Justinian, but probably not before, a pledgee had it if the debtor was insolvent, or if he had from any cause lost his personal claim against the debtor. In all these cases it lay against the owner himself, as an actio in factum. Secondly, leges did not in themselves apply to persons who were not true Roman citizens but an actio ficticia was given in this case for others. Thirdly, the lex covered only cases of property. Injury of a freeman was thus not within it, as a man was not considered to own his body. The praetor gave an actio utilis to a freeman who, or whose filiusfamilias, had been injured, but not where a freeman was killed.

Lastly, the lex applied only where the damage was done by the body to the body, corpore corpori. The praetor gave an action, utilis or in factum where it was by but not to the body, as by throwing grain into a river: it might not be harmed, but in effect it was destroyed. So too where it was to, but not by, the body, as where one put poison where a slave was likely to take it, but not actually administering it. So too where it was neither, as by opening a stable door so that animals escaped and were lost. It is easy to see that these lines might be difficult to draw. There is no great difference between mixing the seed in the sower's bag, which gives the direct action, and sowing false seed after him which does not. The line between actually administering poison and merely facilitating the taking might be rather fine.

In some of these cases an actio utilis was given; in others an actio in factum. Gaius tells us that it was utilis wherever it was not corpore, but the Institutes say that if it was not corpore or corpori the action was in factum, which would make it utilis if it was corpore but not corpori. When we turn to the texts in the Digest it is difficult to make them conform to any rule. Even the direct action is given in cases which seem to be more appropriate to one of the others, and as between these, any logical scheme is unattainable. This may be because the question was one of procedure, never very important, and practically obsolete in the time of Justinian. In view of the words reddendo actiones in factum accommodatas legi Aquiliae, idque utilitas huius legis exigit, it is to be doubted whether any distinction is intended.
