= Actio Pauliana =

The Actio Pauliana is an action in Roman law intended to protect creditors from fraudulent legal transactions, specifically transactions intended to reduce a debtor's estate by transfers to third parties in bad faith.

== Context in Roman legal history ==
Praetor involvement in shaping Roman law resulted in the creation of several delicts within jus praetorium, one of which was fraus creditorum, or defrauding creditors. This delict covered a wide variety of acts on behalf of the debtor, including transfers of property, freeing slaves or releasing their own debtors from their obligations - all intended to limit the creditor's ability to collect. Starting in the 1st century BCE, praetors began using their imperium to aid creditors affected by fraus creditorum, first by simple restitutio in integrum and a special interdict – interdictum fraudatorium. Eventually, a separate action was created for this purpose – Actio Pauliana, specifically focused on reversing fraudulent transactions undertaken to defraud creditors.

== Details of the action in ancient Roman law ==
The Actio Pauliana can be undertaken by the creditor within a year of the transaction in question taking place. The aim of the actio is the return of property transferred to third parties. The target of the actio can be the debtor themselves, but also any third party that has received property as part of fraus creditorum. Good faith is taken into account - third parties partaking in defrauding creditors with full knowledge are not granted any protection from potential loss as a result of the actio, although transfers at no cost to the third party are not protected even in good faith. The overall aim of the action is the restoration of the material status quo ante - for this reason even the produce of defrauded property must be recovered.

== In modern law ==
The action has found its way (in modernized forms) into some modern legal systems, especially in Europe.

=== Belgium ===
Article 1167 of the old Belgian Civil Code makes a reference to fraus creditorum and constitutes a form of actio Pauliana. Article 5.243 of the Belgian civil code references the actio Pauliana.

=== Brazil ===
Section VI, Chapter IV, Title I of Book III the Brazilian Civil Code of 2002 is dedicated to fraud against creditors, and describes a form of actio Pauliana related to insolvency.

=== France ===
Articles 1341, 1341-1 though 4 of the French Civil Code contain elements reminiscent of the actio Pauliana, including the consideration of good faith on the part of receiving third parties.

=== Italy ===
Article 2901 of the Italian Civil Code mirrors the actio Pauliana, with considerations of good faith both on the debtors as well as the receiving third party.

=== Netherlands ===
Dutch law distinguishes as many as three separate forms of actio Pauliana:

- The "general Pauliana", described in articles 45-48 of Book 3 of the Civil Code,
- The "bankruptcy Pauliana", described in articles 42-51 of the Bankruptcy Act (Faillissementswet),
- The "inheritance Pauliana", described in article 205 of Book 4 of the Civil Code.

=== Poland ===
Article 527 of the Civil Code of Poland is often considered by scholars to be a modern form of the actio Pauliana, and it is commonly referred to as such in legal discourse. It serves the same purpose as the Roman institution, but defines the circumstances in which it can be applied more clearly, including exactly when a transaction by a debtor is fraudulent and a presumption of bad faith for transfers between persons in close contact with one another.

=== Portugal ===
Articles 610 through 618 of the Portuguese Civil Code are titled "Paulian impugnation" (impugnação pauliana) and allow a creditor to attack transactions with third parties that jeopardise their debtor's solvency. If the transaction is not free (i.e. it is not a donation) and is undertaken when the debtor already owes debt to the creditor, the debtor and the third party must have been in bad faith with regard to hurting the former's creditors. If the transaction was undertaken prior to the creditor's credit, the transaction can only be challenged if there was intention or deceipt by both the debtor and the third party to hurt the creditor.

=== Switzerland ===
Article 285ff of Swiss insolvency law (Art. 285 ff. SchKG) has been likened to actio Pauliana, although it is tied strictly to insolvency rather to fraus creditorum on its own, and can only be invoked in case of bankruptcy.

=== Canada ===
In the province of Quebec, whose private law is based on civil law, the civil code refers explicitly in articles 1631-36 to a “Paulian action” where efforts by a debtor to make himself insolvent or to otherwise defraud a creditor are unenforceable vis-a-vis that creditor.
