= Condictio =

Latin legal term for an "action" or "summons"

In Roman Civil Law, a Condictio (plural condictiones) referred to an "action" or "summons"; hence, compounds in legal Latin refer to various types of actions:

- condictio causa data causa non secuta
- condictio cautionis
- condictio certae pecuniae
- condictio certae rei
- condictio certi
- condictio ex causa furtiva
- condictio ex injusta causa
- condictio ex lege
- condictio ex paenitentia
- condictio furtiva
- condictio incerti
- condictio indebiti
- condictio liberationis
- condictio ob causam datorum
- condictio ob injustam causam
- condictio ob rem dati
- condictio ob turpem causam
- condictio possessionis
- condictio sine causa
- condictio triticaria

== See also ==
- Unjust enrichment
