= Infamia =

Loss of social standing in ancient Roman law

In ancient Rome, infamia (in-, "not", and fama, "reputation") was a loss of legal or social standing. As a technical term in Roman law, infamia was juridical exclusion from certain protections of Roman citizenship, imposed as a legal penalty by a censor or praetor. In more general usage during the Republic and Principate, infamia was damage to the esteem (aestimatio) in which a person was held socially; that is, to one's reputation. A person who suffered infamia was an infamis (plural infames).

== As a legal penalty ==
Infamia was a form of censure more disgraceful than ignominia, which in its technical sense resulted from the censors' nota censoria, a figurative branding or marking of a citizen that included removal from the Roman Senate or other reduction of status. Ignominia, however, was an impermanent status that could be ameliorated, for instance by paying off a debt. A debtor who could not meet his obligations might eventually suffer infamia, a penalty that legislation passed under Julius Caesar sought to mitigate through payment options.

In addition to bankruptcy, a judgment of flagrant dishonesty over contractual relations and other business dealings could result in infamia. Examples of legal actions for which infamia was a penalty (called actiones famosae or actiones turpes) generally involved a betrayal of trust, at times as expressed by lack of respect for another's property rights. A successful lawsuit claiming theft (furtum) or seizure of movable goods by force (rapina) could result in infamia for the defendant. In 66 BC, a praetorian edict permitted lawsuits against "fraud by means of deception" (dolus) when no other contractual remedy was available. Dolus was so broadly defined that Cicero characterized this kind of lawsuit as a fishing expedition. A contractual obligation of mandatum was based on friendship and could not involve any payment, but a lawsuit could be brought to seek restitution for loss or damage; a depositum was the contractual placing of property in the keeping of someone who was not supposed to use it, and legal action could be undertaken to show that the depositary did not fulfill his obligation or refused to return it. A conviction for either an actio mandati or an actio depositi resulted in infamia primarily for breaking one's word, beyond material or financial loss.

Iniuria (from which English "injury" derives) was a broad category for a wrongful act that could be penalized by infamia, including bodily harm and damage against property or reputation, as well as "affronts to decency" and what would now be called sexual harassment.

Other grounds for infamia included dishonorable discharge from the military, bigamy, and "misbehavior in family life."

== Consequences ==
Infames shared some conditions of status with slaves: they could not provide testimony in a court of law, and they were liable to corporal punishment. They could not bring lawsuits to the court on behalf of themselves or others, and they could not run for public office.

== The infames ==
Infamia was an "inescapable consequence" for certain kinds of employment, including that of undertakers, executioners, prostitutes and pimps, entertainers such as actors and dancers, and gladiators. The collective infamia of stage performers, prostitutes, and gladiators arose from the uses to which they put their bodies: by subjecting themselves to public display, they had surrendered the right of privacy and bodily integrity that defined the citizen. The infamia of entertainers did not exclude them from socializing among the Roman elite, and entertainers who were "stars", both men and women, sometimes became the lovers of such high-profile figures as Mark Antony and the dictator Sulla.

Charioteers may or may not have been infames; two jurists of the later Imperial era argue that athletic competitions were not mere entertainment but "seem useful" as instructive displays of Roman strength and virtus. The low status of those who competed in public games in Rome stands in striking contrast to athletics in Greece, where Olympic victors enjoyed high honors. A passive homosexual who was "outed" might be subject to social infamia in the colloquial sense without being socially ostracized, and if a citizen he might retain his legal standing.

== Religious infamy ==
In late antiquity, when the Roman Empire had come under Christian rule, infamia was used to punish "religious deviants" such as heretics, apostates, and those who declined to give up their own religious practices and convert to Christianity. The modern Roman Catholic Church has the similar concept of infamy.

== See also ==
- Sexuality in ancient Rome
- Pittura infamante
