= 286 BC =

286 BC in various calendars
Gregorian calendar	286 BC; CCLXXXVI BC
Ab urbe condita	468
Ancient Egypt era	XXXIII dynasty, 38
Pharaoh	Ptolemy I Soter, 38
Ancient Greek Olympiad (summer)	123rd Olympiad, year 3
Assyrian calendar	4465
Balinese saka calendar	N/A
Bengali calendar	−879 – −878
Berber calendar	665
Buddhist calendar	259
Burmese calendar	−923
Byzantine calendar	5223–5224
Chinese calendar	甲戌年 (Wood Dog); 2412 or 2205 — to — 乙亥年 (Wood Pig); 2413 or 2206
Coptic calendar	−569 – −568
Discordian calendar	881
Ethiopian calendar	−293 – −292
Hebrew calendar	3475–3476
- Hindu calendars
Vikram Samvat	−229 – −228
Shaka Samvat	N/A
Kali Yuga	2815–2816
Holocene calendar	9715
Iranian calendar	907 BP – 906 BP
Islamic calendar	935 BH – 934 BH
Javanese calendar	N/A
Julian calendar	N/A
Korean calendar	2048
Minguo calendar	2197 before ROC 民前2197年
Nanakshahi calendar	−1753
Seleucid era	26/27 AG
Thai solar calendar	257–258
Tibetan calendar	阳木狗年 (male Wood-Dog) −159 or −540 or −1312 — to — 阴木猪年 (female Wood-Pig) −158 or −539 or −1311

Year 286 BC was a year of the pre-Julian Roman calendar. At the time it was known as the Year of the Consulship of Corvus (or Potitus) and Paetus (or, less frequently, year 468 Ab urbe condita). The denomination 286 BC for this year has been used since the early medieval period, when the Anno Domini calendar era became the prevalent method in Europe for naming years.

== Events ==
=== By place ===
==== Greece ====
- As Demetrius Poliorcetes and his army are chased across Asia Minor to the Taurus Mountains by the armies of Lysimachus and Seleucus, in Greece his son Antigonus meets with success. Ptolemy's fleet is driven off and Athens surrenders to Antigonus.
- After allowing Pyrrhus of Epirus to remain in possession of Macedonia with the title of king, he is expelled by Lysimachus who declares himself its king in the place of Pyrrhus.

==== Roman Republic ====
- The new law, Lex Aquilia, is enacted. This is a Roman law which provides compensation to the owners of property injured as a result of someone's fault.

==== China ====
- General Sima Cuo of the State of Qin attacks the Henei area of the State of Wei. Wei responds by handing over the major city of Anyi.

== Births ==
- Antiochus II Theos, king of the Hellenistic Seleucid Kingdom from 261 BC (d. 246 BC)
