= Capitis deminutio =

Term used in Roman law

Capitis deminutio or capitis diminutio (diminished capacity) is a term used in Roman law, referring to the extinguishing, either in whole or in part, of a person's former status and legal capacity. There were three changes of state or condition attended with different consequences: maxima, media, and minima.

The greatest, capitis deminutio maxima, involved the loss of liberty, citizenship, and family (e.g., being made a slave or prisoner of war). Capitis deminutio media consisted of a loss of citizenship and family without any forfeiture of personal liberty. Capitis deminutio minima consisted of a person ceasing to belong to a particular family, without loss of liberty or citizenship.

== See also ==
- Diminished responsibility
