= Lex Cornelia =

Lex Cornelia refers to any ancient Roman law (lex) sponsored by an official whose gens name was Cornelius, particularly Sulla. Known examples of a lex Cornelia include:

- Lex Cornelia de iniuriis
- Lex Cornelia de praetoribus
- Lex Cornelia de proscriptione
- Lex Cornelia de provinciis
- Lex Cornelia de repetundis
- Lex Cornelia de sicariis et veneficis
- Lex Cornelia de maiestate
- Lex Cornelia de XX Quaestoribus
