= Auctorati =

Non-enslaved gladiators

Auctorati were free-men of ancient Rome, who hired themselves out as gladiators. Auctorati were referred to by their proper names, which differentiated them from slaves, who were referred to by single word stage names.

According to one source, the earliest evidence of the use of auctorati dates from 122 BC (law of Gaius Gracchus).
