= Rei vindicatio =

Legal action; demand by the plaintiff that the defendant return their property

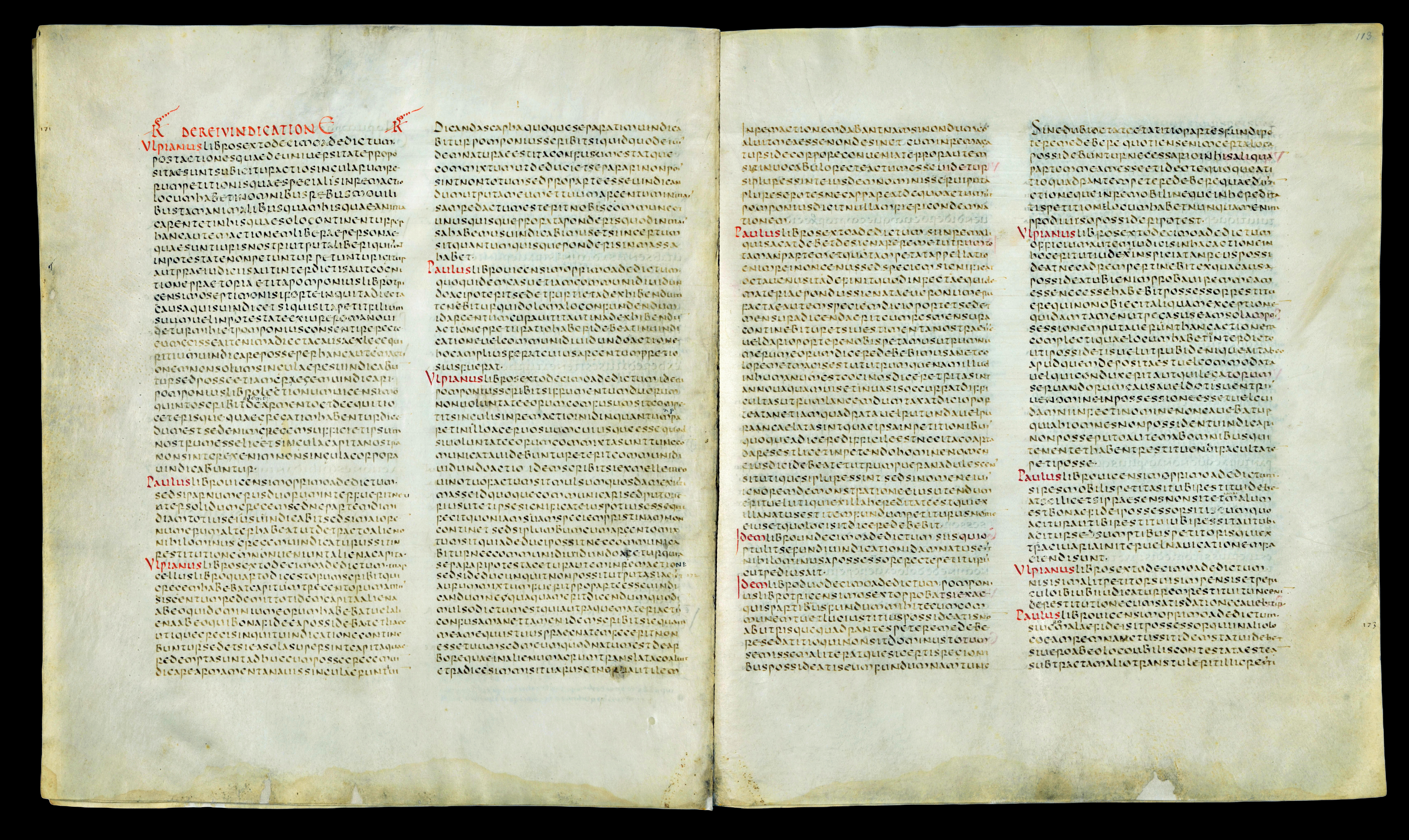
Digest excerpt about the rei vindicatio compiling the opinions of the Ulpian and Paulus from the 6th-century Littera Florentina.

In Roman law, rei vindicatio (from Latin 'claim of the subject') was a legal action by which the plaintiff demands that the defendant return a thing that belongs to the plaintiff. It may be used only when the plaintiff owns the thing, and the defendant has wrongly claimed or assumed possession of the same thing, and is currently impeding the plaintiff's possession of the thing.

The plaintiff could also institute an actio furti (a personal action) to punish the defendant. If the thing could not be recovered, the plaintiff could claim damages from the defendant with the aid of the condictio furtiva (a personal action). With the aid of the actio legis Aquiliae (a personal action), the plaintiff could claim damages from the defendant.

The term originated in ancient Roman law. It was derived from the ius civile, and therefore was available only to Roman citizens.

== Specification of the thing ==
The function of rei vindicatio remains the same in most modern legal systems as it was in ancient Rome. However, Roman law was much more particular about the specification of the "thing". A plaintiff could not have won a case without specifying the thing in question.

At a theoretical level, Roman jurists identified three kinds of "thing":

- Corpus unitum
- Corpus coniunctum
- Corpus ex distantibus was not a single thing, but a bundle of independent things, such as a herd of cattle. Cattle were so important in Roman society that Roman jurists developed the regulation on cattle on a full scale. Corpus ex distantibus was the most disputed of the three.

== Greek influence on Roman legal thought ==
Two law schools in Rome, the Sabinian school and the Proculian school, remained influential from the late Republic throughout the classical period. Most modern Romanists consider these schools to be influenced to some extent by Greek philosophy. They say that the Sabinian school was the student of Stoicism, while the Proculian school followed Aristotle or Peripateticism. Greek influence is especially evident in classical Roman thinking on accession and specification. Sabinians, following Stoicism, argued that in these areas hyle ‘substance’ supersedes eidos ‘form’. Proculians countered that eidos is the decisive factor for a fate of a thing.

== See also ==
- Replevin
- Trover
- Detinue
- Conversion (law)
- Bailment
- In rem
- Bona fide purchaser
