= Condictio causa data causa non secuta =

Roman legal action to recover transferred property

In Roman law, the condictio causa data causa non secuta was a legal action (condictio) for recovery of a transfer of property, where the purpose for the transfer had failed (causa non secuta). During the recognition of innominate contracts, and their enforcement via the actio praescriptis verbis, the condictio causa data causa non secuta still had relevance, however, outside the field of valid contracts. This can be explained by reference to the purpose which failed (the basis of the action): where pacta sunt servanda, the purpose is successful on discharge of the legal duties which flow from the contract, namely transfer of the object of the contract.

The condictio causa data causa non secuta still exists in German Law. Its modern short form is called "condictio ob rem". It has been used in several cases of post-socialist economies of Eastern Europe where the state was selling state owned property to nouveaux riches with an explicit request for the property (usually factories, but also land and other) to be brought for a specific purpose. As such requests were as a rule not fulfilled, in some (but by far not all) cases the public pressure has forced the governments to act upon the initial contract and claim back the property, paying the buyer who had failed to carry out his or her part of the agreement partial (or rarely full) restitution for his or her payment according to the first contract. Such cases were usually related to issues of bribery and embezzlement by state officials in the instances of signing the initial contracts of sale.

Scots law also still recognises the action of condictio causa data causa non secuta among the other condictiones, as was shown in the landmark case, in the field of unjustified enrichment (restitution), of Shilliday v Smith (especially per Lord President Rodger).
