= Debtors (Scotland) Act 1987 =

Act of the Parliament of the United Kingdom

Debtors (Scotland) Act 1987 (Note: Section 109(1).)
- Act of Parliament
- Parliament of the United Kingdom
- Long title: An Act to make new provision with regard to Scotland for an extension of time for payment of debts; to amend the law relating to certain diligences; to make provision in respect of messengers-at-arms and sheriff officers; and for connected purposes.
- Citation: 1987 c. 18
- Territorial extent: Scotland (Note: Section 109(3).)

Dates
- Royal assent: 15 May 1987
- Commencement: By order of the Lord Advocate (Note: Section 109(2).)

Other legislation
- Amends: Lyon King of Arms Act 1592; Lyon King of Arms Act 1669; Lyon King of Arms Act 1672; Subscription of Deeds Act 1681; Bills of Exchange Act 1681; Heritable Jurisdictions (Scotland) Act 1746; Tenures Abolition Act 1746; Bank Notes (Scotland) Act 1765; Bills of Exchange (Scotland) Act 1772; Debtors (Scotland) Act 1838; Citations (Scotland) Act 1846; Harbours, Docks and Piers Clauses Act 1847; Exchequer Court (Scotland) Act 1856; Debts Securities (Scotland) Act 1856; Lyon King of Arms Act 1867; Court of Session Act 1868; Titles to Land Consolidation (Scotland) Act 1868; Writs Execution (Scotland) Act 1877; Debtors (Scotland) Act 1880; Civil Imprisonment (Scotland) Act 1882; Sea Fisheries Act 1883; Sheriff Courts (Scotland) Extracts Act 1892; Merchant Shipping Act 1894; Execution of Diligence (Scotland) Act 1926; Local Government (Scotland) Act 1947; Crown Proceedings Act 1947; Sea Fisheries Act 1968; Law Reform (Miscellaneous Provisions) (Scotland) Act 1966; Social Work (Scotland) Act 1968; Taxes Management Act 1970; Merchant Shipping Act 1970; Sheriff Courts (Scotland) Act 1971; Prevention of Oil Pollution Act 1971; Town and Country Planning (Scotland) Act 1972; Consumer Credit Act 1974; Criminal Procedure (Scotland) Act 1975; Crofting Reform (Scotland) Act 1976; Patents Act 1977; Customs and Excise Management Act 1979; Merchant Shipping Act 1979; Sale of Goods Act 1979; Education (Scotland) Act 1980; Betting and Gaming Duties Act 1981; British Fishing Boats Act 1983; Car Tax Act 1983; Value Added Tax Act 1983; British Fishing Boats Act 1983; Finance Act 1984; Rent (Scotland) Act 1984; Bankruptcy (Scotland) Act 1985; Legal Aid (Scotland) Act 1986; See § Repealed enactments
- Repeals/revokes: See § Repealed enactments
- Amended by: Statute Law (Repeals) Act 1993; Value Added Tax Act 1994; Local Government etc. (Scotland) Act 1994; Merchant Shipping Act 1995; Diligence against Earnings (Variation) (Scotland) Regulations 1995; Employment Rights Act 1996; Planning (Consequential Provisions) (Scotland) Act 1997; Finance Act 1997; Social Security Act 1998; Statute Law (Repeals) Act 1998; Reserve Forces Act 1996 (Consequential Provisions etc.) Regulations 1998; Social Security Contributions (Transfer of Functions, etc.) Act 1999; Abolition of Feudal Tenure etc. (Scotland) Act 2000; Child Support, Pensions and Social Security Act 2000; Debt Arrangement and Attachment (Scotland) Act 2002; Tax Credits Act 2002; Enterprise Act 2002 (Insolvency) Order 2003; Statute Law (Repeals) Act 2004; Civil Partnership Act 2004; Commissioners for Revenue and Customs Act 2005; Armed Forces Act 2006; Diligence against Earnings (Variation) (Scotland) Regulations 2006; Bankruptcy and Diligence etc. (Scotland) Act 2007; Child Maintenance and Other Payments Act 2008; Finance Act 2008; Diligence against Earnings (Variation) (Scotland) Regulations 2009; Diligence against Earnings (Variation) (No. 2) (Scotland) Regulations 2009; Public Services Reform (Scotland) Act 2010; Civil Jurisdiction and Judgments (Maintenance) Regulations 2011; Financial Services Act 2012; International Recovery of Maintenance (Hague Convention 2007) (Scotland) Regulations 2012; Diligence against Earnings (Variation) (Scotland) Regulations 2012; Revenue Scotland and Tax Powers Act 2014; Diligence against Earnings (Variation) (Scotland) Regulations 2015; Bankruptcy (Scotland) Act 2016; Courts Reform (Scotland) Act 2014 (Relevant Officer and Consequential Provisions) Order 2016; Diligence against Earnings (Variation) (Scotland) Regulations 2018; First-tier Tribunal for Scotland Housing and Property Chamber (Incidental Provisions) Regulations 2019; Jurisdiction and Judgments (Family) (Amendment etc.) (EU Exit) Regulations 2019; Diligence against Earnings (Variation) (Scotland) Regulations 2021; Coronavirus (Recovery and Reform) (Scotland) Act 2022; Diligence against Earnings (Variation) (Scotland) Regulations 2023; Bankruptcy and Diligence (Scotland) Act 2024; Diligence against Earnings (Variation) (Scotland) Regulations 2024

Status: Amended

Text of statute as originally enacted

Revised text of statute as amended

Text of the Debtors (Scotland) Act 1987 as in force today (including any amendments) within the United Kingdom, from legislation.gov.uk.

The Debtors (Scotland) Act 1987 (1987 c. 18) is an act of the Parliament of the United Kingdom that made new provision with regard to Scotland for an extension of time for payment of debts, amended the law relating to certain diligences, and made provision in respect of messengers-at-arms and sheriff officers.

== Provisions ==
=== Repealed enactments ===
Section 108(3) of the act repealed 40 enactments, listed in schedule 8 to the act.

Citation	Short title	Extent of repeal
1503 c. 45	Diligence Act 1503	The whole act.
1579 c. 13	Registration Act 1579	The whole act.
1579 c. 45	Hornings Act 1579	The whole act.
1581 c. 26	Convention of Burghs Act 1581	The whole act.
1584 c. 15	Execution of Decrees Act 1584	The whole act.
1587 c. 30	Officers of Arms Act 1587	The whole act.
1592 c. 29	Lyon King of Arms Act 1592	In section (3) the words "messingeris and", the words "and messingeris" and the words from "With power" to the end. In section (5) the words "and incarceratioun" and the words from "vnder the pane" to the end.
1593 c. 34	Hornings Act 1593	The whole act.
1600 c. 22	Hornings Act 1600	The whole act.
1607 c. 13	Convention of Burghs Act 1607	The whole act.
1621 c. 20	Hornings Act 1621	The whole act.
1661 c. 218	Poinding Act 1661	The whole act.
1669 c. 5	Poinding Act 1669	The whole act.
1669 c. 95	Lyon King of Arms Act 1669	The words from "the fourtie sext" to "Together also with"
1672 c. 47	Lyon King of Arms Act 1672	The words from "are judges" to "office and"
1681 c. 5	Subscription of Deeds Act 1681	The word "hornings"
1681 c. 86	Bills of Exchange Act 1681	The words from "Letters of horning" to "and other"
20 Geo. 2. c. 43	Heritable Jurisdictions (Scotland) Act 1746	Section 28
20 Geo. 2. c. 50	Tenures Abolition Act 1746	Sections 12 and 13
5 Geo. 3. c. 49	Bank Notes (Scotland) Act 1765	In section 6 the words from "issuing" to "all other"
12 Geo. 3. c. 72	Bills of Exchange (Scotland) Act 1772	In section 42 the words "by horning or other diligence". In section 43 the words "by horning or other diligence".
1 & 2 Vict. c. 114	Debtors (Scotland) Act 1838	Sections 2 to 15. Sections 23 to 31. In section 32 the words "excepting in the case of poindings". Section 35. All the Schedules.
9 & 10 Vict. c. 67	Citations (Scotland) Act 1846	In section 1 the words "excepting only in cases of poinding as aforesaid"
19 & 20 Vict. c. 56	Exchequer Court (Scotland) Act 1856	In section 28 the words from "except that" to the end. Sections 29 to 34. Section 36. Section 42. Schedules G to K.
19 & 20 Vict. c. 91	Debts Securities (Scotland) Act 1856	In section 6 the words "of hornings"
33 & 34 Vict. c. 63	Wages Arrestment Limitation (Scotland) Act 1870	The whole act.
43 & 44 Vict. c. 34	Debtors (Scotland) Act 1880	In section 4, the proviso, the words from "a warrant" to "or under" and the words "or obligation"
45 & 46 Vict. c. 42	Civil Imprisonment (Scotland) Act 1882	Section 5
55 & 56 Vict. c. 17	Sheriff Courts (Scotland) Extracts Act 1892	Section 7(6)
10 & 11 Geo. 6. c. 43	Local Government (Scotland) Act 1947	Sections 248 and 249. In section 250, the words from "together with" to "goods and effects" where second occurring. Sections 251 and 252.
10 & 11 Geo. 6. c. 44	Crown Proceedings Act 1947	In section 46, proviso (a)
8 & 9 Eliz. 2. c. 21	Wages Arrestment Limitation Amendment (Scotland) Act 1960	The whole act.
1966 c. 19	Law Reform (Miscellaneous Provisions) (Scotland) Act 1966	Sections 2 and 3
1968 c. 49	Social Work (Scotland) Act 1968	In section 80, subsections (2) and (3)
1970 c. 36	Merchant Shipping Act 1970	In section 11(1)(a), the words "or arrestment"
1971 c. 58	Sheriff Courts (Scotland) Act 1971	Section 36(4)
1973 c. 22	Law Reform (Diligence) (Scotland) Act 1973	The whole act.
1979 c. 39	Merchant Shipping Act 1979	In section 39, subsection (2) and in subsection (3) the words "or arrestment" and the words from "and, as" to the end
1979 c. 54	Sale of Goods Act 1979	Section 40
1984 c. 43	Finance Act 1984	Section 16

== Subsequent developments ==
The act has been amended on numerous occasions. Significant amendments were made by the Debt Arrangement and Attachment (Scotland) Act 2002, the Bankruptcy and Diligence etc. (Scotland) Act 2007, the Bankruptcy (Scotland) Act 2016, and the Bankruptcy and Diligence (Scotland) Act 2024. The Scottish Ministers have also periodically made regulations under the powers conferred by Part III of the act to vary the earnings figures used in earnings arrestment, most recently by the Diligence against Earnings (Variation) (Scotland) Regulations 2024 (S.S.I. 2024/293).
