= List of acts of the Parliament of Scotland from 1467 =

This is a list of acts of the Parliament of Scotland for the year 1466.

It lists acts of Parliament of the old Parliament of Scotland, that was merged with the old Parliament of England to form the Parliament of Great Britain, by the Union with England Act 1707 (c. 7).

For other years, see list of acts of the Parliament of Scotland. For the period after 1707, see list of acts of the Parliament of Great Britain.

== 1466 ==
=== October ===
The 1st parliament of James III, held in Edinburgh from 9 October 1466 until 13 October 1466.

Short title, or popular name	Citation	Royal assent
Long title
Church Act 1466 (repealed)	October 1466 c. 1 (Note: This is the citation in the Record Edition.); 1466 c. 1 (Note: This is the citation in the Duodecimal Edition.)	9 October 1466
Of halikirk. Of the holy church. (Repealed by Statute Law Revision (Scotland) Act 1906 (6 Edw. 7. c. 38))
Commission of Parliament Act 1466 (repealed)	October 1466 c. 2 — (Note: This act is not listed in the Duodecimal Edition.)	9 October 1466
Of a commission of Parliament for treating of the mariage of our lorde the king my lady (Note: Mary Stewart, Countess of Arran.) my lordis of Albany (Note: Alexander Stewart, Duke of Albany.) and Marr (Note: John Stewart, Earl of Mar.) and for divers uthir thingis. Of a commission of Parliament for treating of the marriage of our lord the king, my lady, my lords of Albany and Mar, and for diverse other things. (Repealed by Statute Law Revision (Scotland) Act 1906 (6 Edw. 7. c. 38))
Queen's Dowry Act 1466 (repealed)	October 1466 c. 3 —	9 October 1466
Anent the dowry of the queyne. Regarding the dowry of the queen. (Repealed by Statute Law Revision (Scotland) Act 1906 (6 Edw. 7. c. 38))
Benefices Act 1466 (repealed)	October 1466 c. 4 —	9 October 1466
Anent commendis of beneficis religious or seculare. Regarding commends of benefices, religious or secular. (Repealed by Statute Law Revision (Scotland) Act 1906 (6 Edw. 7. c. 38))
Pensions out of Benefices Act 1466 (repealed)	October 1466 c. 5 —	9 October 1466
Of pensionis oute of beneficis. Of pensions out of benefices. (Repealed by Statute Law Revision (Scotland) Act 1906 (6 Edw. 7. c. 38))
Lawburrows Act 1466 (repealed)	October 1466 c. 6 —	9 October 1466
Anentis law borowis and the unlawis of thame that brekis the samyn. Concerning lawburrows and the penalty of those that break the same. (Repealed by Statute Law Revision (Scotland) Act 1906 (6 Edw. 7. c. 38))
Induciæ of Summons Act 1466 (repealed)	October 1466 c. 7 —	9 October 1466
Anentis summondis to be abregeit to xxi dayis. Concerning summons to be shortened to 21 days. (Repealed by Statute Law Revision (Scotland) Act 1906 (6 Edw. 7. c. 38))
Pupils and Minors Act 1466 (repealed)	October 1466 c. 8 —	9 October 1466
Anentis barnes that ar put in feis of landis. Regarding children that are put in fees of land. (Repealed by Statute Law Revision (Scotland) Act 1906 (6 Edw. 7. c. 38))
Benefices (No. 2) Act 1466 (repealed)	October 1466 c. 9 —	9 October 1466
That na Inglis man have benefice within Scotlande. That no Englishman may have any benefice within Scotland. (Repealed by Statute Law Revision (Scotland) Act 1906 (6 Edw. 7. c. 38))
Money Act 1466 (repealed)	October 1466 c. 10 —	9 October 1466
Anent the money and for the haldin of the samyn within the realme. Regarding the money, and for the holding of the same within the realm. (Repealed by Statute Law Revision (Scotland) Act 1906 (6 Edw. 7. c. 38))
Money (No. 2) Act 1466 (repealed)	October 1466 c. 11 —	9 October 1466
For the inbringing of the moneye in the realme. For the importing of money into the realm. (Repealed by Statute Law Revision (Scotland) Act 1906 (6 Edw. 7. c. 38))
Coinage Act 1466 (repealed)	October 1466 c. 12 —	9 October 1466
Of coppir money to be cunyeit and of the cours of all uthir money. Of copper money to be coined and of the circulation of all other money. (Repealed by Statute Law Revision (Scotland) Act 1906 (6 Edw. 7. c. 38))
Hospitals Act 1466 (repealed)	October 1466 c. 13 —	9 October 1466
For the reformacioune of the hospitalis. For the reformation of the hospitals. (Repealed by Statute Law Revision (Scotland) Act 1906 (6 Edw. 7. c. 38))

=== January ===
The 2nd parliament of James III, held in Edinburgh on 31 January 1467.

Short title, or popular name	Citation	Royal assent
Long title
Foreign Trade Act 1466 (repealed)	January 1466 c. 1 (Note: This is the citation in the Record Edition.); 1466 c. 11 (Note: This is the citation in the Duodecimal Edition.)	31 January 1467
That nane sale nor pass in merchandise out of the realme bot fre men. That none sale nor import merchandise out of the realm, but freemen. (Repealed by Statute Law Revision (Scotland) Act 1906 (6 Edw. 7. c. 38))
Craftsmen and Merchants Act 1466 (repealed)	January 1466 c. 2; 1466 c. 12	31 January 1467
That na man of craft use merchandise. That no craftsman undertake trade. (Repealed by Statute Law Revision (Scotland) Act 1906 (6 Edw. 7. c. 38))
Merchants Act 1466 (repealed)	January 1466 c. 3; 1466 c. 13	31 January 1467
That na man sale in merchandise without half a last of gudis. That no man shall sail-in merchandise without half a last of goods. (Repealed by Statute Law Revision (Scotland) Act 1906 (6 Edw. 7. c. 38))
Charter Party Act 1466 (repealed)	January 1466 c. 4; 1466 c. 14	31 January 1467
That na schip be frachtyt without a charter party. That no ship be freighted without a charter party. (Repealed by Statute Law Revision (Scotland) Act 1906 (6 Edw. 7. c. 38))
Restraint on Shipping Act 1466 (repealed)	January 1466 c. 5; 1466 c. 15	31 January 1467
That na schip be frachtit with staple gudis fra the fest of Symondis day and Jude (Note: The feast day of Saints Simon and Jude falls on 28 October.) on to candilmes. (Note: Candlemas falls on 2 February.); That no ship be freighted with staple goods from the feat of Simon's and Jude's Day until Candlemas. (Repealed by Statute Law Revision (Scotland) Act 1906 (6 Edw. 7. c. 38))
Restraint on Trade Act 1466 (repealed)	January 1466 c. 6; 1466 c. 16	31 January 1467
That nane by nor sel na mak merchandise to the Swyn the Sluse the Dam or Bruges. (Note: Bruges, Belgium.); That none buy nor sell nor trade to the Swyn, the Sluice, Amsterdam, or Bruges. (Repealed by Statute Law Revision (Scotland) Act 1906 (6 Edw. 7. c. 38))
Trade with Middleburg Act 1466 (repealed)	January 1466 c. 7 — (Note: This act is not listed in the Duodecimal Edition.)	29 August 1467
Tollerance granted till merchandis to do thar merchandise at Myddilburgh. (Note: Middelburg, Zeeland, the Netherlands.); Tollerance granted to merchants to do their merchandise at Middleburg. (Repealed by Statute Law Revision (Scotland) Act 1906 (6 Edw. 7. c. 38))
Trade with France and Norway Act 1466 (repealed)	January 1466 c. 8; 1466 c. 17	29 August 1467
Licence til merchandis to sale to the Rochel (Note: La Rochelle, France.) Burdeus (Note: Bordeaux, France.) France and Noroway. Licence to merchants to sail to La Rochelle, Bordeaux, France and Norway. (Repealed by Statute Law Revision (Scotland) Act 1906 (6 Edw. 7. c. 38))

=== Sources ===
- Alexander, William (1841). "Acta Parliamentorum Regis Jacobi Tertii". An Abridgement of the Acts of the Parliaments of Scotland. Edinburgh: Adam and Charles Black. p. 442 – via Google Books.
- Alexander, William (1841). "Acta Parliamentorum Regis Jacobi Tertii". An Abridgement of the Acts of the Parliaments of Scotland. Edinburgh: Adam and Charles Black. p. 442 – via Google Books.
- Chronological Table of the Statutes. London: Her Majesty's Stationery Office. 1972. pp. 1319–1320 – via Google Books.
- "Index of Statutes: James III (1460-1488)". Records of the Parliaments of Scotland to 1707. University of St Andrews.

== 1467 ==
=== October ===
The 3rd parliament of James III, held in Edinburgh from 12 October 1467 until 17 October 1467.

Short title, or popular name	Citation	Royal assent
Long title
Foreign Money Act 1467 (repealed)	October 1467 c. 1 (Note: This is the citation in the Record Edition.); 1467 c. 18 (Note: This is the citation in the Duodecimal Edition.)	12 October 1467
Of the course of the mone of uthir realmis and of the blak pennyis. Of the circulation of the money of other realms, and of the black pennies. (Repealed by Statute Law Revision (Scotland) Act 1906 (6 Edw. 7. c. 38))
Currency Act 1467 (repealed)	October 1467 c. 2; 1467 c. 19	12 October 1467
Of the payment of dettis and contractis bigane according to the cours of the mone at the making of the contractis. Of the payment of debts and bygone contracts according to the course of the money at the making of the contract. (Repealed by Statute Law Revision (Scotland) Act 1906 (6 Edw. 7. c. 38))
Ferries Act 1467 (repealed)	October 1467 c. 3; 1467 c. 20	12 October 1467
That briggis of buirdis be maide at ferryis for the eis of schipping of hors. That bridges of boards be made at ferries for the easy of shipping of horses. (Repealed by Statute Law Revision (Scotland) Act 1906 (6 Edw. 7. c. 38))
Currency (No. 2) Act 1467 (repealed)	October 1467 c. 4; 1467 c. 21	12 October 1467
The proposition of the Clergy and burrowis tuiching the payment of subsidis procuracyis custumis and dewteis gif the mone be proclamit to lawer price grantyt be the king. The proposition of the Clergy and burghs touching the payment of subsidy, procuracies, customs and duties if the money be proclaimed to at a lower price granted by the king. (Repealed by Statute Law Revision (Scotland) Act 1906 (6 Edw. 7. c. 38))

=== January ===
The 4th parliament of James III, held in Stirling on 12 January 1468.

Short title, or popular name	Citation	Royal assent
Long title
King's Marriage Act 1467 (repealed)	January 1467 c. 1 (Note: This is the citation in the Record Edition.) — (Note: This act is not listed in the Duodecimal Edition.)	12 January 1468
Anent the mariage of our soverane lord. About the marriage of our sovereign lord. (Repealed by Statute Law Revision (Scotland) Act 1906 (6 Edw. 7. c. 38))
Norway Act 1467 (repealed)	January 1467 c. 2 —	12 January 1468
Anent the mater of Noroway. About the matter of Norway. (Repealed by Statute Law Revision (Scotland) Act 1906 (6 Edw. 7. c. 38))
Currency (No. 3) Act 1467 (repealed)	January 1467 c. 3; 1467 c. 22 (Note: This is the citation in the Duodecimal Edition.)	12 January 1468
Of the cours of the Scottis grote of the croune. Of the circulation of the Scottish groat of the crown. (Repealed by Statute Law Revision (Scotland) Act 1906 (6 Edw. 7. c. 38))
Currency (No. 4) Act 1467 (repealed)	January 1467 c. 4; 1467 c. 22	12 January 1468
Of the cours of the Inglis penny. Of the circulation of the English penny. (Repealed by Statute Law Revision (Scotland) Act 1906 (6 Edw. 7. c. 38))
Currency (No. 5) Act 1467 (repealed)	January 1467 c. 5; 1467 c. 22	12 January 1468
Of the cours of the quhite Scottis pennyis. Of the circulation of the white Scottish penny. (Repealed by Statute Law Revision (Scotland) Act 1906 (6 Edw. 7. c. 38))
Currency (No. 6) Act 1467 (repealed)	January 1467 c. 6; 1467 c. 22	12 January 1468
Of the cours of the blak mone. Of the circulatiuon of the black money. (Repealed by Statute Law Revision (Scotland) Act 1906 (6 Edw. 7. c. 38))
Currency (No. 7) Act 1467 (repealed)	January 1467 c. 7; 1467 c. 22	12 January 1468
Anent the heing of the avale of the crounite grote and Inglis penny. Regarding the raising of the value of the crowned groat and English penny. (Repealed by Statute Law Revision (Scotland) Act 1906 (6 Edw. 7. c. 38))
Import of Bullion Act 1467 (repealed)	January 1467 c. 8 —	12 January 1468
Anent the inbringing of bulyon. About the importation of bullion. (Repealed by Statute Law Revision (Scotland) Act 1906 (6 Edw. 7. c. 38))
Weights and Measures Act 1467 (repealed)	January 1467 c. 9; 1467 c. 22	12 January 1468
Anentis mettis and mesuris. Regarding metts and measures. (Repealed by Statute Law Revision (Scotland) Act 1906 (6 Edw. 7. c. 38))
Assessment on Barons Act 1467 (repealed)	January 1467 c. 10 —	12 January 1468
Anent the taxt of the barouns—Inquisicion to be takin and retourit of the avale of ilk mannis rent. Regarding the tax of the barons: Inquisition to be taken and returned of the value of each man's rent. (Repealed by Statute Law Revision (Scotland) Act 1906 (6 Edw. 7. c. 38))
Receivers of Taxes Act 1467 (repealed)	January 1467 c. 11 —	12 January 1468
The resavouris of the taxt—The personis ordanit to take the said Inquisicions in the several schirefdomis. The receivers of the tax: The persons ordained to take the said Inquisitions of the several sheriffdoms. (Repealed by Statute Law Revision (Scotland) Act 1906 (6 Edw. 7. c. 38))

=== Sources ===
- Alexander, William (1841). "Acta Parliamentorum Regis Jacobi Tertii". An Abridgement of the Acts of the Parliaments of Scotland. Edinburgh: Adam and Charles Black. pp. 442–443 – via Google Books.
- Alexander, William (1841). "Acta Parliamentorum Regis Jacobi Tertii". An Abridgement of the Acts of the Parliaments of Scotland. Edinburgh: Adam and Charles Black. pp. 442–443 – via Google Books.
- Chronological Table of the Statutes. London: Her Majesty's Stationery Office. 1972. p. 1320 – via Google Books.
- "Index of Statutes: James III (1460-1488)". Records of the Parliaments of Scotland to 1707. University of St Andrews.

== See also ==
- List of legislation in the United Kingdom
- Records of the Parliaments of Scotland
