= List of acts of the Parliament of Scotland from 1593 =

This is a list of acts of the Parliament of Scotland for the year 1593.

It lists acts of Parliament of the old Parliament of Scotland, that was merged with the old Parliament of England to form the Parliament of Great Britain, by the Union with England Act 1707 (c. 7).

For other years, see list of acts of the Parliament of Scotland. For the period after 1707, see list of acts of the Parliament of Great Britain.

== 1593 ==
The 13th parliament of James VI, held in Edinburgh from 3 April 1593.

Short title, or popular name	Citation	Royal assent
Long title
Not public and general	1593 c. 1 (Note: This is the citation in the Record Edition.) — (Note: This is the citation in the Duodecimal Edition.) (Note: This act is not listed in the Duodecimal Edition.)	21 July 1593
The decreit of reductioun of the proces sentence and dome of foirfaltour led and deduceit aganis umquhill Johnne Lindsay of Wauchoip.
Not public and general	1593 c. 2 —	21 July 1593
Anent the dispositioun of the giftis of escheat lyfrent or foirfaltour of the erlis of Angus Huntlie Erroll and uthe ris contenit in the summondis of foir faltour execute aganis thame.
Not public and general	1593 c. 3 —	21 July 1593
Act concerning the eschaetis of the personis contenit in the summondis of foir faltour for birning of Dunybirsell and slauchter of the erll of Murray.
Not public and general	1593 c. 4 —	21 July 1593
Act concerning the deletioun of William Gordoun of Auchindore furth of the summondis of foirfaltour.
Not public and general	1593 c. 5 —	21 July 1593
Offeris presentit to the estaitis be the laird of Balquhane in name of the erlis of Angus Huntlie and Erroll and utheris.
Markets on Sundays Act 1593 (repealed)	1593 c. 6; 1593 c. 163	21 July 1593
Act aganis keping of marcattis on the sabboth day. (Repealed by Statute Law Revision (Scotland) Act 1906 (6 Edw. 7. c. 38))
Jurisdiction of Church Act 1593 (repealed)	1593 c. 7; 1593 c. 164	21 July 1593
For puneisment of the contempnaris of the decreittis and judicatoriis of the kirk. (Repealed by Statute Law Revision (Scotland) Act 1906 (6 Edw. 7. c. 38))
Glebes Act 1593 (repealed)	1593 c. 8; 1593 c. 165	21 July 1593
Anent the ministeris gleibis. (Repealed by Statute Law Revision (Scotland) Act 1906 (6 Edw. 7. c. 38))
Ministers Act 1593 (repealed)	1593 c. 9; 1593 c. 166	21 July 1593
Act for releif of ministeris that ar trublit be pensionaris or takismen. (Repealed by Statute Law Revision (Scotland) Act 1964 (c. 80))
Benefices Act 1593 (repealed)	1593 c. 10; 1593 c. 167	21 July 1593
Act anent benefices disponit to ministeris. (Repealed by Statute Law Revision (Scotland) Act 1906 (6 Edw. 7. c. 38))
Mass Act 1593 (repealed)	1593 c. 11; 1593 c. 168	21 July 1593
Aganis the sayaris of messe and ressattaris or interteneyaris of excommunicat papistes. (Repealed by Statute Law Revision (Scotland) Act 1906 (6 Edw. 7. c. 38))
Minsters' Livings Act 1593 (repealed)	1593 c. 12; 1593 c. 169	21 July 1593
Act that na particuler act of parliament sall prejuge the ministeris in thair levingis. (Repealed by Statute Law Revision (Scotland) Act 1964 (c. 80))
Lawburrows Act 1593 (repealed)	1593 c. 13; 1593 c. 170	21 July 1593
Additioun to the panis of lawborrowis and unlawes. (Repealed by Statute Law Revision (Scotland) Act 1906 (6 Edw. 7. c. 38))
Not public and general	1593 c. 14; 1593 c. 171	21 July 1593
Anent annuellis payit out of the propirtie of the croun to prelattis or beneficit personis.
Customs Officers Act 1593 (repealed)	1593 c. 15; 1593 c. 172	21 July 1593
For puneisment of custumaris and sercheouris offending in their offices. (Repealed by Statute Law Revision (Scotland) Act 1906 (6 Edw. 7. c. 38))
Remissions Act 1593 (repealed)	1593 c. 16; 1593 c. 173	21 July 1593
Anent remissionis and respeittis. (Repealed by Statute Law Revision (Scotland) Act 1906 (6 Edw. 7. c. 38))
Vassals of Forfeited Persons Act 1593 (repealed)	1593 c. 17 —	21 July 1593
Explanatioun of the act maid in favour of the vassallis of personis foirfaltit. (Repealed by Statute Law Revision (Scotland) Act 1906 (6 Edw. 7. c. 38))
Crown Lands Act 1593 (repealed)	1593 c. 18; 1593 c. 175	21 July 1593
That infeftmentis of the propirtie without consent of the comptrollar salbe null. (Repealed by Statute Law Revision (Scotland) Act 1906 (6 Edw. 7. c. 38))
Patronage Act 1593 (repealed)	1593 c. 19; 1593 c. 176	21 July 1593
Anent new infeftmentis with richt of patronage. (Repealed by Statute Law Revision (Scotland) Act 1906 (6 Edw. 7. c. 38))
Church Lands Act 1593 (repealed)	1593 c. 20; 1593 c. 190	21 July 1593
Anent confirmationis of kirklandis subscryvit of auld be the king and under the privie seill. (Repealed by Statute Law Revision (Scotland) Act 1906 (6 Edw. 7. c. 38))
Not public and general	1593 c. 21 —	21 July 1593
Act for mending of the calsay of the Cannowgait and outwith the watter yett.
Assault in Courts Act 1593 (repealed)	1593 c. 22; 1593 c. 177	21 July 1593
Act for puneisement of thame that trublis the parliament sessioun and uther jugementis. (Repealed by Statute Law Revision (Scotland) Act 1964 (c. 80))
Remissions (No. 2) Act 1593 (repealed)	1593 c. 23; 1593 c. 178	21 July 1593
Act concerning the disorderis in the wast marche. (Repealed by Statute Law Revision (Scotland) Act 1906 (6 Edw. 7. c. 38))
College of Justice Act 1593 (repealed)	1593 c. 24; 1593 c. 174	21 July 1593
Ratficatioun of the privilegis of the College of Justice. (Repealed by Statute Law Revision (Scotland) Act 1906 (6 Edw. 7. c. 38))
Execution of Deeds Act 1593 (repealed)	1593 c. 25; 1593 c. 179	21 July 1593
That the wreittar insert his name in the body of the wreitt. (Repealed by Statute Law Revision (Scotland) Act 1964 (c. 80))
Benefices Act 1593 (repealed)	1593 c. 26; 1593 c. 186	21 July 1593
Act in favour of personis quha wer provydit to the successorie of benefices befoir the yeir of God 1584. (Repealed by Statute Law Revision (Scotland) Act 1906 (6 Edw. 7. c. 38))
Not public and general	1593 c. 27; 1593 c. 192	21 July 1593
Annexatioun of the abbay of Dumfermling to the croun.
Not public and general	1593 c. 28 —	21 July 1593
Act of the new gift of Dumfermling with the monkis portionis to the Quenis Majestie.
Not public and general	1593 c. 29 —	21 July 1593
Act concerning the Quenis Majesties richt to the thrid of Dumfermling and compensatioun for samekle as presentlie wantis thairof.
Suspensions Act 1593 (repealed)	1593 c. 30 —	21 July 1593
Commissioun anent decyding of suspensionis in the kingis causes. (Repealed by Statute Law Revision (Scotland) Act 1906 (6 Edw. 7. c. 38))
Coinage Act 1593 (repealed)	1593 c. 31 —	21 July 1593
Commissioun anent the cunyie. (Repealed by Statute Law Revision (Scotland) Act 1906 (6 Edw. 7. c. 38))
Not public and general	1593 c. 32; 1593 c. 180	21 July 1593
Annexatioun of the propirtie to the croun that wes nocht annext of befoir.
Burghs Act 1593 (repealed)	1593 c. 33 —	21 July 1593
Ratificatioun of the liberties and privilegis of burrowis. Ratification of the liberties and privileges of burghs. (Repealed by Statute Law Revision (Scotland) Act 1906 (6 Edw. 7. c. 38))
Hornings Act 1593 (repealed)	1593 c. 34; 1593 c. 181	21 July 1593
Act for the better executioun of decreittis and actis. (Repealed by Debtors (Scotland) Act 1987 (c. 18))
Not public and general	1593 c. 35; 1593 c. 187	21 July 1593
Act in favour of the toun of Edinburgh concerning tumultis.
Export of Hides Act 1593 (repealed)	1593 c. 36; 1593 c. 182	21 July 1593
Aganis the transporting of calf kid and certane uther skynnis. (Repealed by Statute Law Revision (Scotland) Act 1906 (6 Edw. 7. c. 38))
Customs Act 1593 (repealed)	1593 c. 37; 1593 c. 183	21 July 1593
Anent the custume to be tane of Englische beir. (Repealed by Statute Law Revision (Scotland) Act 1906 (6 Edw. 7. c. 38))
Dean of Guild Act 1593 (repealed)	1593 c. 38; 1593 c. 184	21 July 1593
Act concerning the deane of gildis jurisdictioun in burrowis. (Repealed by Statute Law Revision (Scotland) Act 1906 (6 Edw. 7. c. 38))
Common Good of Burghs Act 1593 (repealed)	1593 c. 39; 1593 c. 185	21 July 1593
Anent the commoun gude of burrowis. Regarding the common good of burghs. (Repealed by Statute Law Revision (Scotland) Act 1964 (c. 80))
Not public and general	1593 c. 40 —	21 July 1593
Act in favour of the burgh of Edinburgh concerning the reparatioun of thair tolbuith and wallis.
Not public and general	1593 c. 41 —	21 July 1593
Confirmatioun to the burgh of Edinburgh of thair annuellis.
Not public and general	1593 c. 42 —	21 July 1593
Act in favour of the bischope of Abirdene anent the temporall landis thairof.
Not public and general	1593 c. 43 —	21 July 1593
Act of dissolutioun of the personage and vicarage of Kirklistoun.
Not public and general	1593 c. 44 —	21 July 1593
Act in favour of maister Patrik Galloway and Johnne Duncansone ministeris anent the temporalitie of Dumblane.
Ministers' Stipends Act 1593 (repealed)	1593 c. 45 —	
Commissioun anent the ministeris stipendis. (Repealed by Statute Law Revision (Scotland) Act 1906 (6 Edw. 7. c. 38))
Privy Council Act 1593 (repealed)	1593 c. 46 —	
Anent the Kingis Majesties privie counsaill. (Repealed by Statute Law Revision (Scotland) Act 1906 (6 Edw. 7. c. 38))
Not public and general	1593 c. 47 —	
Supplicatioun of the ministeris of Dumfermling remittit to the Quenis Majesties counsaill.
Not public and general	1593 c. 48 —	
Ratificatioun to the erll Merschell anent the college in Abirdene.
Not public and general	1593 c. 49 —	
Act in favour of the erll Merschell anent the heavin of Piterheid.
Not public and general	1593 c. 50 —	
Act in favour of Andro commendater of Jedburgh.
Not public and general	1593 c. 51 —	
Act in favour of Andro lord Stewart of Uchiltrie.
Not public and general	1593 c. 52 —	
Act in favour of the laird of Bass.
Not public and general	1593 c. 53 —	
Ratificatioun to the laird of Edmeistoun.
Not public and general	1593 c. 54 —	
Act in favour of Coline Makenyie of Kintale.
Not public and general	1593 c. 55 —	
Act in favour of the duik of Lennox anent the superioritie of the bischoipries of Sanctandrois and Glasgow.
Not public and general	1593 c. 56 —	
Act in favour of the laird of Polwart.
Not public and general	1593 c. 57 —	
Act in favour of the burgh of Abirdene for ane marcatt.
Not public and general	1593 c. 58 —	
Act in favour of the said burgh of Abirdene for confirmatioun of thair annuellis.
Not public and general	1593 c. 59 —	
Act anent the marcat day of the burgh of Foirfar.

=== Sources ===
- Alexander, William (1841). "Acta Parliamentorum Regis Jacobi Sexti". An Abridgement of the Acts of the Parliaments of Scotland. Edinburgh: Adam and Charles Black. pp. A34 – A35 – via Google Books.
- Alexander, William (1841). "Acta Parliamentorum Regis Jacobi Sexti". An Abridgement of the Acts of the Parliaments of Scotland. Edinburgh: Adam and Charles Black. pp. A34 – A35 – via Google Books.
- Chronological Table of the Statutes. London: Her Majesty's Stationery Office. 1972. pp. 1342–1343 – via Google Books.
- "Index of Statutes: James VI (1567-1625)". Records of the Parliaments of Scotland to 1707. University of St Andrews.

== See also ==
- List of legislation in the United Kingdom
- Records of the Parliaments of Scotland
