= List of acts of the Parliament of Scotland from 1579 =

This is a list of acts of the Parliament of Scotland for the year 1579.

It lists acts of Parliament of the old Parliament of Scotland, that was merged with the old Parliament of England to form the Parliament of Great Britain, by the Union with England Act 1707 (c. 7).

For other years, see list of acts of the Parliament of Scotland. For the period after 1707, see list of acts of the Parliament of Great Britain.

== 1579 ==
The 6th parliament of James VI.

| Short title, or popular name | Citation | Royal assent |
Long title
| Not public and general | 1579 c. 1 (Note: This is the citation in the Record Edition.) — (Note: This act is not listed in the Duodecimal Edition.) | 10 November 1579 |
Forisfactura Joannis Hammilton commendatarii de Abirbrothok Claudii Hammiltoun commissarii de Paislay et aliorum, &c.
| Not public and general | 1579 c. 2 — | 10 November 1579 |
Act in the favouris of Jeane Dischingtoun ane of the airis of Ardros.
| Not public and general | 1579 c. 3 — | 10 November 1579 |
Act in favouris of dame Margret Lyoun Countesse of Cassillis.
| Not public and general | 1579 c. 4 — | 10 November 1579 |
Act in the favour of Margret Cunnynghame relict of umquhile James Cochren of Barbachlaw.
| Not public and general | 1579 c. 5 — | 10 November 1579 |
Tueicheing the disheresing of the posteritie of thame that ar convict of the murtheris of the king our Soverane lordis dearest father and tua Regentis.
| Church Act 1579 still in force | 1579 c. 6; 1579 c. 68 (Note: This is the citation in the Duodecimal Edition.) | 10 November 1579 |
Anent the trew and haly kirk and of thame declarit not to be of the same.
| Church Jurisdiction Act 1579 still in force | 1579 c. 7; 1579 c. 69 | 10 November 1579 |
Anent the iurisdictioun of the kirk. About the jurisdiction of the church.
| Sunday Act 1579 (repealed) | 1579 c. 8; 1579 c. 70 | 10 November 1579 |
Dischargeing of mercattis on sondayis. (Repealed by Statute Law (Repeals) Act 1989 (c. 43))
| Converts to Papacy Act 1579 (repealed) | 1579 c. 9; 1579 c. 71 | 10 November 1579 |
Anent the youth and utheris beyond sey suspectit to have declinit frome the trew religioun. (Repealed by Statute Law Revision (Scotland) Act 1906 (6 Edw. 7. c. 38))
| Bibles Act 1579 (repealed) | 1579 c. 10; 1579 c. 72 | 10 November 1579 |
That househaldaris have bybillis and psalme buikis. (Repealed by Statute Law Revision (Scotland) Act 1906 (6 Edw. 7. c. 38))
| Drawing Teind Act 1579 (repealed) | 1579 c. 11; 1579 c. 73 | 10 November 1579 |
For releiff of the laboraris of the ground troublit for want of tymous teynding of thair cornis. (Repealed by Statute Law Revision (Scotland) Act 1906 (6 Edw. 7. c. 38))
| Beggars and Poor Act 1579 (repealed) | 1579 c. 12; 1579 c. 74 | 10 November 1579 |
For punishment of the strang and ydle beggaris and releif of the pure and impotent. For punishment of strong and idle Beggars, and relief of the poor and impotent. (Repealed by Statute Law Revision (Scotland) Act 1906 (6 Edw. 7. c. 38))
| Registration Act 1579 (repealed) | 1579 c. 13; 1579 c. 75 | 10 November 1579 |
For pwnishment of personis that contempnandlie remanis rebellis and at the horne. (Repealed by Debtors (Scotland) Act 1987 (c. 18))
| Officers at Arms Act 1579 (repealed) | 1579 c. 14; 1579 c. 76 | 10 November 1579 |
For remeid of the fraude and disordour usit amangis officiaris of armes in executioun of criminall lettres. (Repealed by Statute Law Revision (Scotland) Act 1906 (6 Edw. 7. c. 38))
| Lawburrows Act 1579 (repealed) | 1579 c. 15; 1579 c. 77 | 10 November 1579 |
That the panes of lauborrowis salbe devidit betuix the king and the pairty offendit unto. (Repealed by Statute Law Revision (Scotland) Act 1906 (6 Edw. 7. c. 38))
| Criminal Letters Act 1579 still in force | 1579 c. 16; 1579 c. 78 | 10 November 1579 |
Aganis sic as troublis thair nychtbouris be criminale persute saikles.
| Perambulations Act 1579 (repealed) | 1579 c. 17; 1579 c. 79 | 10 November 1579 |
Anent the cheising of inquestis in caussis of perambulatioun. (Repealed by Statute Law Revision (Scotland) Act 1906 (6 Edw. 7. c. 38))
| Subscription of Deeds Act 1579 (repealed) | 1579 c. 18; 1579 c. 80 | 10 November 1579 |
Anent the inserting of witnesses in obligationis and writtis of importance. (Repealed by Requirements of Writing (Scotland) Act 1995 (c. 7))
| Prescription (Ejections) Act 1579 (repealed) | 1579 c. 19; 1579 c. 81 | 10 November 1579 |
Anent prescriptioun in causses of spulyie and eiectionis. (Repealed by Prescription and Limitation (Scotland) Act 1973 (c. 52))
| Prescription (No. 1) Act 1579 (repealed) | 1579 c. 20; 1579 c. 82 | 10 November 1579 |
Anent prescriptioun in caussis of removing. (Repealed by Statute Law Revision (Scotland) Act 1964 (c. 80))
| Prescription Act 1579 (repealed) | 1579 c. 21; 1579 c. 83 | 10 November 1579 |
Anent prescriptioun in certane causses of debt. (Repealed by Prescription and Limitation (Scotland) Act 1973 (c. 52))
| Woods Act 1579 (repealed) | 1579 c. 22; 1579 c. 84 | 10 November 1579 |
Anent the distroyaris of planting hanyng and policie. (Repealed by Statute Law Revision (Scotland) Act 1906 (6 Edw. 7. c. 38))
| Burghs Act 1579 (repealed) | 1579 c. 23; 1579 c. 85 | 10 November 1579 |
Ratificatioun of the privilegis of burrowis. (Repealed by Statute Law Revision (Scotland) Act 1906 (6 Edw. 7. c. 38))
| Sea Fishing Act 1579 (repealed) | 1579 c. 24; 1579 c. 86 | 10 November 1579 |
Anent packing peiling forstalling and transporting of hering and quheit fische. (Repealed by Statute Law Revision (Scotland) Act 1906 (6 Edw. 7. c. 38))
| Firearms Act 1579 (repealed) | 1579 c. 25; 1579 c. 87 | 10 November 1579 |
For executioun of the act of parliament maid anent bering wering and schuting of culveringis and daggis. (Repealed by Statute Law Revision (Scotland) Act 1906 (6 Edw. 7. c. 38))
| Forestallers Act 1579 (repealed) | 1579 c. 26; 1579 c. 88 | 10 November 1579 |
For pwnischement of Regrataris and foirstallaris. (Repealed by Forestalling, Regrating, etc. Act 1844 (7 & 8 Vict. c. 24))
| Salmon Act 1579 (repealed) | 1579 c. 27; 1579 c. 89 | 10 November 1579 |
Anent the distructioun of cruvis and yairis slauchter of reid fische and smoltis be wandis or utherwyse. (Repealed by Statute Law Revision (Scotland) Act 1906 (6 Edw. 7. c. 38))
| Coals Act 1579 (repealed) | 1579 c. 28; 1579 c. 90 | 10 November 1579 |
Anent the transporting of coillis furth of the realme. (Repealed by Statute Law Revision (Scotland) Act 1906 (6 Edw. 7. c. 38))
| Expense of Process Act 1579 (repealed) | 1579 c. 29; 1579 c. 91 | 10 November 1579 |
For pwnischement of thame that tynis the pley within burgh. (Repealed by Statute Law Revision (Scotland) Act 1906 (6 Edw. 7. c. 38))
| King's Revocation Act 1579 (repealed) | 1579 c. 30 — | 11 November 1579 |
Ratificatioun of oure soverane lordis revocatioun off feis and pensionis. (Repealed by Statute Law Revision (Scotland) Act 1906 (6 Edw. 7. c. 38))
| Coinage Act 1579 (repealed) | 1579 c. 31 — | 11 November 1579 |
Anent our soverane lordis counyie. (Repealed by Statute Law Revision (Scotland) Act 1906 (6 Edw. 7. c. 38))
| King's Council Act 1579 (repealed) | 1579 c. 32 — | 11 November 1579 |
Anent the establischeing of the kingis Majesties Counsale. (Repealed by Statute Law Revision (Scotland) Act 1906 (6 Edw. 7. c. 38))
| Forfeitures Act 1579 (repealed) | 1579 c. 33 — | 11 November 1579 |
Anent the dispositioun of the landis and levingis of the forfaltit personis. (Repealed by Statute Law Revision (Scotland) Act 1906 (6 Edw. 7. c. 38))
| Low Countries Act 1579 (repealed) | 1579 c. 34; 1579 c. 96 | 11 November 1579 |
Anent the scottis men using the privilegis of this natioun in the law cuntreis undir the king of Spanys dominionis. (Repealed by Statute Law Revision (Scotland) Act 1906 (6 Edw. 7. c. 38))
| Low Countries (No. 2) Act 1579 (repealed) | 1579 c. 35; 1579 c. 97 | 11 November 1579 |
For avoiding of the greit nowmer of unfremen sailand in the law cuntreis. (Repealed by Statute Law Revision (Scotland) Act 1906 (6 Edw. 7. c. 38))
| Privy Council Act 1579 (repealed) | 1579 c. 36 — | 11 November 1579 |
Commissioun for taking ordour in certane articlis be the lordis of privie counsale. (Repealed by Statute Law Revision (Scotland) Act 1906 (6 Edw. 7. c. 38))
| Court of Session Act 1579 (repealed) | 1579 c. 37; 1579 c. 92 | 11 November 1579 |
Anent the admissioun of privie writtingis charges and commandis be the lordis of Sessioun. (Repealed by Statute Law Revision (Scotland) Act 1964 (c. 80))
| Court of Session (No. 2) Act 1579 (repealed) | 1579 c. 38; 1579 c. 93 | 11 November 1579 |
Anent the admissioun of the ordiner lordis of the Sessioun and Reformatioun of certane abuses. (Repealed by Statute Law Revision (Scotland) Act 1906 (6 Edw. 7. c. 38))
| Not public and general | 1579 c. 39 — | 11 November 1579 |
Revocatioun of the infeftment of the erledome of Lennox to Lord Charlis.
| Not public and general | 1579 c. 40 — | 11 November 1579 |
Confirmatioun of the infeftment to Robert erle of Lennox.
| Regent Act 1579 (repealed) | 1579 c. 41 — | 11 November 1579 |
Exoneratioun of thingis done in the governament of the erle of Murray regent. (Repealed by Statute Law Revision (Scotland) Act 1906 (6 Edw. 7. c. 38))
| Not public and general | 1579 c. 42 — | 11 November 1579 |
Ratificatioun of the discharge grantit to the erle of Mar.
| Not public and general | 1579 c. 43 — | 11 November 1579 |
Approbatioun of the proceidingis of the nobilmen that execut the kingis majesties commissioun at Hammiltoun and Draffen.
| Not public and general | 1579 c. 44 — | 11 November 1579 |
Anent the dimolishing of Hammiltoun and Draffen.
| Hornings Act 1579 (repealed) | 1579 c. 45; 1579 c. 94 | 11 November 1579 |
Declaratioun Anent the preving of lettres of hornyng and executionis thairof be witnesses. (Repealed by Debtors (Scotland) Act 1987 (c. 18))
| Not public and general | 1579 c. 46 — | 11 November 1579 |
Captane Hume contra Laird of Lethingtoun.
| Not public and general | 1579 c. 47 — | 11 November 1579 |
Act tuecheing the proceidingis in the caussis betuix the Gordonis and Forbessis.
| Not public and general | 1579 c. 48 — | 11 November 1579 |
Act betuix the erle of Montrois and the tennentis of the bischoprik of Dumblane.
| Not public and general | 1579 c. 49 — | 11 November 1579 |
Act in the favouris of the fewaris and takismen of the landis and teyndis belanging to the possessouris of the prelacijs forfaltit.
| Not public and general | 1579 c. 50 — | 11 November 1579 |
Confirmatioun of the infeftment of the heavin of kilrynne to Johnne betoun of Balfoure.
| Not public and general | 1579 c. 51 — | 11 November 1579 |
Act in favour of the hospital of Edinburgh.
| Not public and general | 1579 c. 52 — | 11 November 1579 |
Confirmatioun of the infeftment of the town of faythlie.
| Not public and general | 1579 c. 53 — | 11 November 1579 |
Act betuix patrik fortoun and James huntare.
| Regent (No. 2) Act 1579 (repealed) | 1579 c. 54 — | 11 November 1579 |
Approbatioun of the act maid anent proceiding in the kingis majesties name. (Repealed by Statute Law Revision (Scotland) Act 1906 (6 Edw. 7. c. 38))
| Loyal Subjects Act 1579 (repealed) | 1579 c. 55 — | 11 November 1579 |
Act in favouris of oure souerane lordis trew and faythfull subjectis quhilkis hes constantlie remanit at his hienes obedience. (Repealed by Statute Law Revision (Scotland) Act 1906 (6 Edw. 7. c. 38))
| Spirits Act 1579 (repealed) | 1579 c. 56 — | 11 November 1579 |
Anent the making of aquavitie. (Repealed by Statute Law Revision (Scotland) Act 1906 (6 Edw. 7. c. 38))
| Burghs (No. 2) Act 1579 (repealed) | 1579 c. 57 — | 11 November 1579 |
Commissioun to decide the antiquitie and prioritie amangis the burrowis. (Repealed by Statute Law Revision (Scotland) Act 1906 (6 Edw. 7. c. 38))
| Education Act 1579 (repealed) | 1579 c. 58; 1579 c. 98 | 11 November 1579 |
For instructioun of the youth in musik. (Repealed by Statute Law Revision (Scotland) Act 1906 (6 Edw. 7. c. 38))
| Not public and general | 1579 c. 59 — | 11 November 1579 |
Declaratioun upoun the supplicationis presentit be the erlis of Mortoun Mar and Countesse of Athole.
| Not public and general | 1579 c. 60 — | 11 November 1579 |
Act in favouris of the lord boyd.
| Not public and general | 1579 c. 61 — | 11 November 1579 |
Act for remitting of the mater betuix Johnne Gilbert and Robert Gray burgessis of Edinburgh to the lordis of sessioun.
| Not public and general | 1579 c. 62 — | 11 November 1579 |
Ratificatioun of the reformatioun of the universitie of S^{t} androis.
| Not public and general | 1579 c. 63 — | 11 November 1579 |
The benefite of pacificatioun grantit to the lord fleming.
| Not public and general | 1579 c. 64 — | 11 November 1579 |
The benefite of pacificatioun grantit to the erle of Rothes.
| Not public and general | 1579 c. 65 — | 11 November 1579 |
The benefite of pacificatioun grantit to peter martyne.
| Not public and general | 1579 c. 66 — | 11 November 1579 |
The benefite of pacificatioun grantit to Johnne ritchertsone.
| Not public and general | 1579 c. 67 — | 11 November 1579 |
The benefite pacificatioun grantit to the laird of drylaw.
| Not public and general | 1579 c. 68 — | 11 November 1579 |
The benefite of pacificatioun grantit to Williame henrysoun.
| Not public and general | 1579 c. 69 — | 11 November 1579 |
The benefite of pacificatioun grantit to the airis of quhitlaw.
| Not public and general | 1579 c. 70 — | 11 November 1579 |
The benefite of pacificatioun grantit to the laird of pettadro.
| Not public and general | 1579 c. 71 — | 11 November 1579 |
The benefite of pacificatioun grantit to patrik hepburne of kirklandhill.
| Not public and general | 1579 c. 72 — | 11 November 1579 |
The benefite of pacificatioun grantit to the laird of fortoun.
| Not public and general | 1579 c. 73 — | 11 November 1579 |
The benefite of pacificatioun grantit to the lord somerwell.
| Not public and general | 1579 c. 74 — | 11 November 1579 |
The benefite of pacificatioun grantit to Robert melvile of murdocarnye.
| Not public and general | 1579 c. 75 — | 11 November 1579 |
The benefite of pacificatioun grantit to David melvile.
| Not public and general | 1579 c. 76 — | 11 November 1579 |
The benefite of pacificatioun grantit to James spens of Wilmerstoun.

=== Sources ===
- Alexander, William (1841). "Acta Parliamentorum Regis Jacobi Sexti". An Abridgement of the Acts of the Parliaments of Scotland. Edinburgh: Adam and Charles Black. pp. A23 – A24 – via Google Books.
- Alexander, William (1841). "Acta Parliamentorum Regis Jacobi Sexti". An Abridgement of the Acts of the Parliaments of Scotland. Edinburgh: Adam and Charles Black. pp. A23 – A24 – via Google Books.
- Chronological Table of the Statutes. London: Her Majesty's Stationery Office. 1972. pp. 1336–1337 – via Google Books.
- "Acts of the Old Scottish Parliament: 1579". legislation.gov.uk. The National Archives.
- "Index of Statutes: James VI (1567-1625)". Records of the Parliaments of Scotland to 1707. University of St Andrews.

== See also ==
- List of legislation in the United Kingdom
- Records of the Parliaments of Scotland
