= List of acts of the Parliament of Scotland from 1584 =

This is a list of acts of the Parliament of Scotland for the year 1584.

It lists acts of Parliament of the old Parliament of Scotland, that was merged with the old Parliament of England to form the Parliament of Great Britain, by the Union with England Act 1707 (c. 7).

For other years, see list of acts of the Parliament of Scotland. For the period after 1707, see list of acts of the Parliament of Great Britain.

== 1584 ==
=== May ===
The 8th parliament of James VI, held in Edinburgh from 19 May 1584.

Short title, or popular name	Citation	Royal assent
Long title
Church Act 1584 (repealed)	May 1584 c. 1 (Note: This is the citation in the Record Edition.) — (Note: This act is not listed in the Duodecimal Edition.)	22 May 1584
Anent the libertie of the preching of the trew word of God and administratioun of the Sacramentis. (Repealed by Statute Law Revision (Scotland) Act 1906 (6 Edw. 7. c. 38))
Sovereignty Act 1584 still in force	May 1584 c. 2; 1584 c. 129 (Note: This is the citation in the Duodecimal Edition.)	22 May 1584
Ane act confirming the kingis maiesties Royall power over all statis and subiectis within this Realme.
Authority of Parliament Act 1584 (repealed)	May 1584 c. 3; 1584 c. 130	22 May 1584
Anent the auctoritie of the thrie estatis of Parliament. (Repealed by Statute Law Revision (Scotland) Act 1906 (6 Edw. 7. c. 38))
Unlawful Jurisdictions Act 1584 still in force	May 1584 c. 4; 1584 c. 131	22 May 1584
Ane act dischargeing all Jurisdictionis and Jugementis not approuit be Parliament and all assembleis and conventionis without our souerane lordis speciall licence and Commandement.
Deprivation of Ministers Act 1584 (repealed)	May 1584 c. 5; 1584 c. 132	22 May 1584
Ane act establissing the forme of Jugement anent the depositioun and deprivatioun of ministeris and utheris be nefeceit personis fra thair benefices for worthie causis. (Repealed by Statute Law Revision (Scotland) Act 1906 (6 Edw. 7. c. 38))
Disqualification of Ministers Act 1584 still in force	May 1584 c. 6; 1584 c. 133	22 May 1584
That ministeris sall not be Jugeis nor exerce ony vther ordinare office that may abstract thame fra thair office.
Treason Act (Scotland) 1584 (repealed)	May 1584 c. 7	22 May 1584
Ane act ratefeand the declaratour of the kingis majestie and his estatis tueching the tresounable attempt aganis his hie nes at Ruthven and concerning the lait rebellion and ayderis thairof. (Repealed by Statute Law Revision (Scotland) Act 1906 (6 Edw. 7. c. 38))
Treason (No. 2) Act (Scotland) 1584 (repealed)	May 1584 c. 8; 1584 c. 134	22 May 1584
Ane act for punisment of the authoris of the slanderous and untrew calumneis spokin aganis the kingis majestie his counsell and procedingis or to the dis honour and prejudice of his hienes his parentis progenitouris croun and estate. (Repealed by Statute Law Revision (Scotland) Act 1906 (6 Edw. 7. c. 38))
Treason (No. 3) Act (Scotland) 1584 (repealed)	May 1584 c. 9	22 May 1584
Ane act ratefeing and approving the procedingis of the kingis majestie his counsall and officiaris in the tryall prosecutioun and punisment of the lait rebellioun attemptat aganis his hienes and his auctoritie. (Repealed by Statute Law Revision (Scotland) Act 1906 (6 Edw. 7. c. 38))
Revocation Act 1584 (repealed)	May 1584 c. 10	22 May 1584
Ane act for annulling certane alienationis provisionis and dispositionis maid in prejudice of the kingis majesties eschaet. (Repealed by Statute Law Revision (Scotland) Act 1906 (6 Edw. 7. c. 38))
Reduction of Forfeitures Act 1584 (repealed)	May 1584 c. 11; 1584 c. 135	22 May 1584
Aganis reductioun of foirfalturis for nullitie of proces and that nane travell nor gif counsell to that effect without speciall warrand of the kingis majestie and estatis in Parliament. (Repealed by Statute Law Revision (Scotland) Act 1906 (6 Edw. 7. c. 38))
Remissions Act 1584 (repealed)	May 1584 c. 12; 1584 c. 136	22 May 1584
Aganis the granting of respettis and remissionis for slauchteris fire rasing and utheris odious crymis to be committit efter the dait heiroff. (Repealed by Statute Law Revision (Scotland) Act 1906 (6 Edw. 7. c. 38))
King's Guard Act 1584 (repealed)	May 1584 c. 13; 1584 c. 137	22 May 1584
Ane act tuecheing the provisioun to his hienes of a gard and suir pament of thair ordinare wages. (Repealed by Statute Law Revision (Scotland) Act 1906 (6 Edw. 7. c. 38))
Murders Act 1584 (repealed)	May 1584 c. 14; 1584 c. 138	22 May 1584
Ane act anent slauchter and trubling maid be parties in persute and defence of thair actionis. (Repealed by Statute Law Revision (Scotland) Act 1906 (6 Edw. 7. c. 38))
Execution of Decrees Act 1584 (repealed)	May 1584 c. 15; 1584 c. 139	22 May 1584
Ane act anent the better executioun of decreittis. (Repealed by Debtors (Scotland) Act 1987 (c. 18))
Officers of State Act 1584 (repealed)	May 1584 c. 16	22 May 1584
Ane act approving the constitutioun of cer tane the kingis majesties officiaris of the estate. (Repealed by Statute Law Revision (Scotland) Act 1906 (6 Edw. 7. c. 38))
Attendance at Courts of Law Act 1584 (repealed)	May 1584 c. 17; 1584 c. 140	22 May 1584
Additioun to the actis maid of befoir anent the cumming to courtis and compering at the bar in sober maner in persute and defence of criminall caussis. (Repealed by Statute Law Revision (Scotland) Act 1906 (6 Edw. 7. c. 38))
Not public and general	May 1584 c. 18	22 May 1584
Ane act for disherising of the posteritie of the Erll of Gowrie.
Measures Act 1584 (repealed)	May 1584 c. 19; 1584 c. 141	22 May 1584
Anent the gage and standert of salmound hering and quheit fische and principall stapillis thairof. (Repealed by Statute Law Revision (Scotland) Act 1906 (6 Edw. 7. c. 38))
Commissioners in Ecclesiastical Causes Act 1584 (repealed)	May 1584 c. 20	22 May 1584
Commissioun to the Archiebischop of Sanct androis utheris bishoppis and utheris appointit Commissionaris be the kingis majestie in ecclesiasticall caussis. (Repealed by General Assembly Act 1592 (c. 8))
Rebels Act 1584 (repealed)	May 1584 c. 21; 1584 c. 142	22 May 1584
For explicatioun of the act maid befoir for punisment to rebellis contempnantlie remanand at the horne. (Repealed by Statute Law Revision (Scotland) Act 1906 (6 Edw. 7. c. 38))
Ministers' Stipends Act 1584 (repealed)	May 1584 c. 22	22 May 1584
Ane act for suir assignatioun and pamant of the levingis and stipendis appointit for the ministeris of Goddis word and eschewing of the abuse of diuersitie of prices. (Repealed by Statute Law Revision (Scotland) Act 1906 (6 Edw. 7. c. 38))
Not public and general	May 1584 c. 23	22 May 1584
Act ratefeing the domes of foirfaltour led in Jugement aganis umquhill James sum tyme erll of Mortoun and Williame sum tyme erll of Gowrie convict of the crimis of lesemajestie and execute to the deith thairfoir.
Rebels (No. 2) Act 1584 (repealed)	May 1584 c. 24	22 May 1584
Ane act anent the arreisting intromissioun and sequestratioun of the eschaet guidis and debtis of the rebellis befoir they be convict or put to the horn. (Repealed by Statute Law Revision (Scotland) Act 1906 (6 Edw. 7. c. 38))
Not public and general	May 1584 c. 25	22 May 1584
Act for annexatioun of foirfaltit landis and rentis to the Croun.
Revocation (No. 2) Act 1584 (repealed)	May 1584 c. 26	22 May 1584
Ane act of ratificatioun of the kingis majesties lait Revocatioun. (Repealed by Statute Law Revision (Scotland) Act 1906 (6 Edw. 7. c. 38))
College of Justice Act 1584 (repealed)	May 1584 c. 27	22 May 1584
Ane act anent the reformatioun of the College of Justice. (Repealed by Statute Law Revision (Scotland) Act 1906 (6 Edw. 7. c. 38))
Coinage Act 1584 (repealed)	May 1584 c. 28	22 May 1584
Approbatioun of the lait cunyie of allayit money. (Repealed by Statute Law Revision (Scotland) Act 1906 (6 Edw. 7. c. 38))
Coinage (No. 2) Act 1584 (repealed)	May 1584 c. 29	22 May 1584
Ane act for ane new cunyie of gold. (Repealed by Statute Law Revision (Scotland) Act 1906 (6 Edw. 7. c. 38))
Not public and general	May 1584 c. 30	22 May 1584
Ane act annulling ane confirmatioun grantit of the landis of the erldome of gowrie.
Not public and general	May 1584 c. 31	22 May 1584
Act annulling the pretendit excommunicatioun led againis Mr Robert Montgo merie.
Not public and general	May 1584 c. 32	22 May 1584
Pacificatioun to Johnne lord Fleming.
Not public and general	May 1584 c. 33	22 May 1584
Pacificatioun to Sir Johne Maitland of Thirlstane knycht.
Not public and general	May 1584 c. 34	22 May 1584
Pacificatioun to Marie Flemyng and hir bairnis.
Not public and general	May 1584 c. 35	22 May 1584
Pacificatioun to the airis of umquhill Patrik bischop of Murray.
Not public and general	May 1584 c. 36	22 May 1584
Pacificatioun to the bairnis of umquhill James Borthuik.
Not public and general	May 1584 c. 37	22 May 1584
Pacificatioun to maister David Chalmeris of Ormound.
Not public and general	May 1584 c. 38	22 May 1584
Pacificatioun to David Melvill.
Not public and general	May 1584 c. 39	22 May 1584
Ratificatioun off the remissioun to the Erll of Huntlie.
Not public and general	May 1584 c. 40	22 May 1584
Ratificatioun of the remissioun grantit to the servandis of umquhill George erll of Huntlie.
Not public and general	May 1584 c. 41	22 May 1584
Ratificatioun of the remissioun grantit to Sir Thomas Ker of Ferniherst knicht.
Not public and general	May 1584 c. 42	22 May 1584
Ratificatioun of the remissioun grantit to Robert Balfour.
Not public and general	May 1584 c. 43	22 May 1584
Ratificatioun of certane Infeftmentis grantit to Sir Johne Maitland of Thirlstane knycht.
Not public and general	May 1584 c. 44	22 May 1584
Declaratioun anent the foirfalture of umquhill Sir James Balfour of Pettindreich knycht.
Not public and general	May 1584 c. 45	22 May 1584
Ratificatioun of the frerlandis and annuellis of Aberdene to the hospitall thairof.
Not public and general	May 1584 c. 46	22 May 1584
Ratificatioun of the landis of Pottie and Collenowis to David Murray.
Not public and general	May 1584 c. 47	22 May 1584
Revocatioun of the landis pertening to umquhill William Maitland of Lethingtoun youngar.
Not public and general	May 1584 c. 48	22 May 1584
Ratificatioun of the Infeftment maid to Andro lord Dingwel.
Not public and general	May 1584 c. 49	22 May 1584
Commissioun in favour of Colonell William Stewart Capitane of the kingis majesties gardis.

=== August ===
The 9th parliament of James VI, held in Edinburgh from 20 August 1584.

Short title, or popular name	Citation	Royal assent
Long title
Not public and general	August 1584 c. 1 (Note: This is the citation in the Record Edition.) — (Note: This act is not listed in the Duodecimal Edition.)	22 August 1584
Ane act for disheresing of the posteritie of the personis that ar or salhappin to be convicted of the tressounable attemptat at Striveling.
Ministers and Schoolmasters Act 1584 (repealed)	August 1584 c. 2 —	22 August 1584
Ane act for ane uniforme ordour to be observit be the beneficit men ministeris reiddaris and maisteris of collegis and scuilis in obedience of the kingis majesteis lawis and thair ordinaris. (Repealed by Statute Law Revision (Scotland) Act 1906 (6 Edw. 7. c. 38))
Prelacies Act 1584 (repealed)	August 1584 c. 3; 1584 c. 1 (Note: This is the citation in the Duodecimal Edition.)	22 August 1584
Ane act for annulling of the successoriis of prelaciis purchest of his hienes in the trublous tymis by past of his yung aige. (Repealed by Statute Law Revision (Scotland) Act 1906 (6 Edw. 7. c. 38))
Not public and general	August 1584 c. 4 —	22 August 1584
Act of annexatioun of forfaltit landis and rentis to the Croun.
Feuing of Crown Lands Act 1584 (repealed)	August 1584 c. 5; 1584 c. 6	22 August 1584
Anent the dissolutioun of the unioun of landis annext to the Croun to be sett be our soverane lord in fewferme. (Repealed by Statute Law Revision (Scotland) Act 1906 (6 Edw. 7. c. 38))
Forfeited Lands Act 1584 (repealed)	August 1584 c. 6; 1584 c. 2	22 August 1584
Anent landis lordschipis heretages takis and possessionis of landis and teyndis cummand in our soverane lordis handis be foirfaltour and quhairof the evidentis and rychtis of the personis foirfaltit ar maliciuslie abstractit in defraude of his hienes. (Repealed by Statute Law Revision (Scotland) Act 1906 (6 Edw. 7. c. 38))
Lands of Those Accused of Treason Act 1584 (repealed)	August 1584 c. 7 —	22 August 1584
Act in favour of our soverane lordis thesaurare and his deputt concerning factoriis of the landis and possessionis of the personis suspectit and delaitit of treasoun. (Repealed by Statute Law Revision (Scotland) Act 1906 (6 Edw. 7. c. 38))
Church Lands Act 1584 (repealed)	August 1584 c. 8; 1584 c. 7	22 August 1584
Act for confirmatioun of the fewis of kirklandis alsweill of auld as new. (Repealed by Statute Law Revision (Scotland) Act 1906 (6 Edw. 7. c. 38))
Not public and general	August 1584 c. 9; 1584 c. 3	22 August 1584
That the money and victuallis assignit in tyme bypast for keping of the castellis of Edinburgh Dumbritane Striveling and Blaknes sall remane and abyid with the capitanis and keiparis thairoff.
Decrees in Absence Act 1584 (repealed)	August 1584 c. 10; 1584 c. 3	22 August 1584
Anent decreittis gevin vpoun dowbill poinding or horning. (Repealed by Bankruptcy and Diligence etc. (Scotland) Act 2007 (asp 3))
Subscription of Deeds Act 1584 (repealed)	August 1584 c. 11; 1584 c. 4	22 August 1584
Ane act explanand the act of parliament maid of befoir anent subscriving and seling of wryittis of greit importance. (Repealed by Statute Law Revision (Scotland) Act 1964 (c. 80))
Sumptuary Act 1584 (repealed)	August 1584 c. 12; 1584 c. 5	22 August 1584
Ane act prohibiting the eatting of flesche thrie dayis everie oulk. (Repealed by Statute Law Revision (Scotland) Act 1906 (6 Edw. 7. c. 38))
Export Prohibitions Act 1584 (repealed)	August 1584 c. 13; 1584 c. 9	22 August 1584
Act ratefeing all former actis maid for transporting of forbodin guddis out of this realme. (Repealed by Statute Law Revision (Scotland) Act 1906 (6 Edw. 7. c. 38))
Burghs Act 1584 (repealed)	August 1584 c. 14 —	22 August 1584
Ratificatioun of the libertie of burrowis in generall. (Repealed by Statute Law Revision (Scotland) Act 1906 (6 Edw. 7. c. 38))
Sumptuary (No. 2) Act 1584 (repealed)	August 1584 c. 15 —	22 August 1584
Act ratifeing the act of Parliament maid of befoir anent the exces of coistlie clething. (Repealed by Statute Law Revision (Scotland) Act 1906 (6 Edw. 7. c. 38))
Treason (No. 4) Act (Scotland) 1584 (repealed)	August 1584 c. 16 —	22 August 1584
Commissioun to certane of everie estate with the kingis majesties officiaris to proceid in discussing of the remanent summondis of treasoun and of the articlis and supplicationis now presentit. (Repealed by Statute Law Revision (Scotland) Act 1906 (6 Edw. 7. c. 38))
Not public and general	August 1584 c. 17 —	22 August 1584
Act in favour of Sir Richard Maitland of Lethingtoun knicht.
Not public and general	August 1584 c. 18 —	22 August 1584
Commissioun to considre and approve the erectioun off the college of Aberdene.
Not public and general	August 1584 c. 19 —	22 August 1584
Act annulling the pensionis gevin out off the Archibischoprik off Sanctandrois and bischoprik of Aberdene.
King's Revocation Act 1584 (repealed)	August 1584 c. 20 —	22 August 1584
Ratificatioun of the kingis majesteis revocatioun with additionis and exceptionis specifiit thairin. (Repealed by Statute Law Revision (Scotland) Act 1906 (6 Edw. 7. c. 38))
Not public and general	August 1584 c. 21 —	22 August 1584
Ratificatioun to the erll of Arrane and his spous.
Not public and general	August 1584 c. 22 —	22 August 1584
Ratificatioun grantit to the commendatare of Pettinweme.
Not public and general	August 1584 c. 23 —	22 August 1584
Ratificatioun of the Lord Lovettis infeftment of Bewlie and thrid thairof.
Not public and general	August 1584 c. 24 —	22 August 1584
Ratification of ane decreit gevin in favouris of the Erll of Sutherland aganis the Erll of Caithnes.
Not public and general	August 1584 c. 25 —	22 August 1584
Ratificatioun of the decreit arbitrale betuix the merchandis and craftismen of Edinburgh.
Not public and general	August 1584 c. 26 —	22 August 1584
Ratificatioun in favouris of David erll of Crawfurde concerning the erldome of Gowrie and landis of Clene.
Not public and general	August 1584 c. 27 —	22 August 1584
Ratificatioun of the landis of Boncle and Prestoun to Sir Jhonn Maitland of Thirlstane knycht secretair.
Not public and general	August 1584 c. 28 —	22 August 1584
Act in favour of maister Alexander Dunbar dene of murray.
Not public and general	August 1584 c. 29 —	22 August 1584
Act in favour of William Stewart writtair.
Not public and general	August 1584 c. 30 —	22 August 1584
Ratificatioun grantit to Alexander Erskyn of Gogar upoun the discharge of the castell of Edinburgh.
Not public and general	August 1584 c. 31 —	22 August 1584
Act in favour of David Murray ane of the maisteris of stable.
Not public and general	August 1584 c. 32 —	22 August 1584
Ratificatioun of the contract betuix the Kingis Majestie and Eustache Rogh anent the mynis.
Not public and general	August 1584 c. 33 —	22 August 1584
Ratificatioun to the erle of Montrois thesaurair.
Not public and general	August 1584 c. 34 —	22 August 1584
Ratificatioun to the erll of Craufurd of the landis of Abirnethy.
Not public and general	August 1584 c. 35 —	22 August 1584
Ratificatioun to the erll of Huntlie of the landis of Balquhane.
Not public and general	August 1584 c. 36 —	22 August 1584
Ratificatioun of the factoriis grantit to the erll of Huntlie and the maister of Gray of the lord Glammis leving.
Not public and general	August 1584 c. 37 —	22 August 1584
Ratificatioun to the commendatair of Lundoris of the landis of Pettindreich and utheris.
Not public and general	August 1584 c. 38 —	22 August 1584
Pacificatioun grantit to Robert bischope of Dunkeld.

=== Sources ===
- Alexander, William (1841). "Acta Parliamentorum Regis Jacobi Sexti". An Abridgement of the Acts of the Parliaments of Scotland. Edinburgh: Adam and Charles Black. pp. A26 – A28 – via Google Books.
- Alexander, William (1841). "Acta Parliamentorum Regis Jacobi Sexti". An Abridgement of the Acts of the Parliaments of Scotland. Edinburgh: Adam and Charles Black. pp. A26 – A28 – via Google Books.
- Chronological Table of the Statutes. London: Her Majesty's Stationery Office. 1972. pp. 1338–1339 – via Google Books.
- "Acts of the Old Scottish Parliament: 1584". legislation.gov.uk. The National Archives.
- "Index of Statutes: James VI (1567-1625)". Records of the Parliaments of Scotland to 1707. University of St Andrews.

== See also ==
- List of legislation in the United Kingdom
- Records of the Parliaments of Scotland
