= Court order =

Official proclamation by a judge or panel of judges

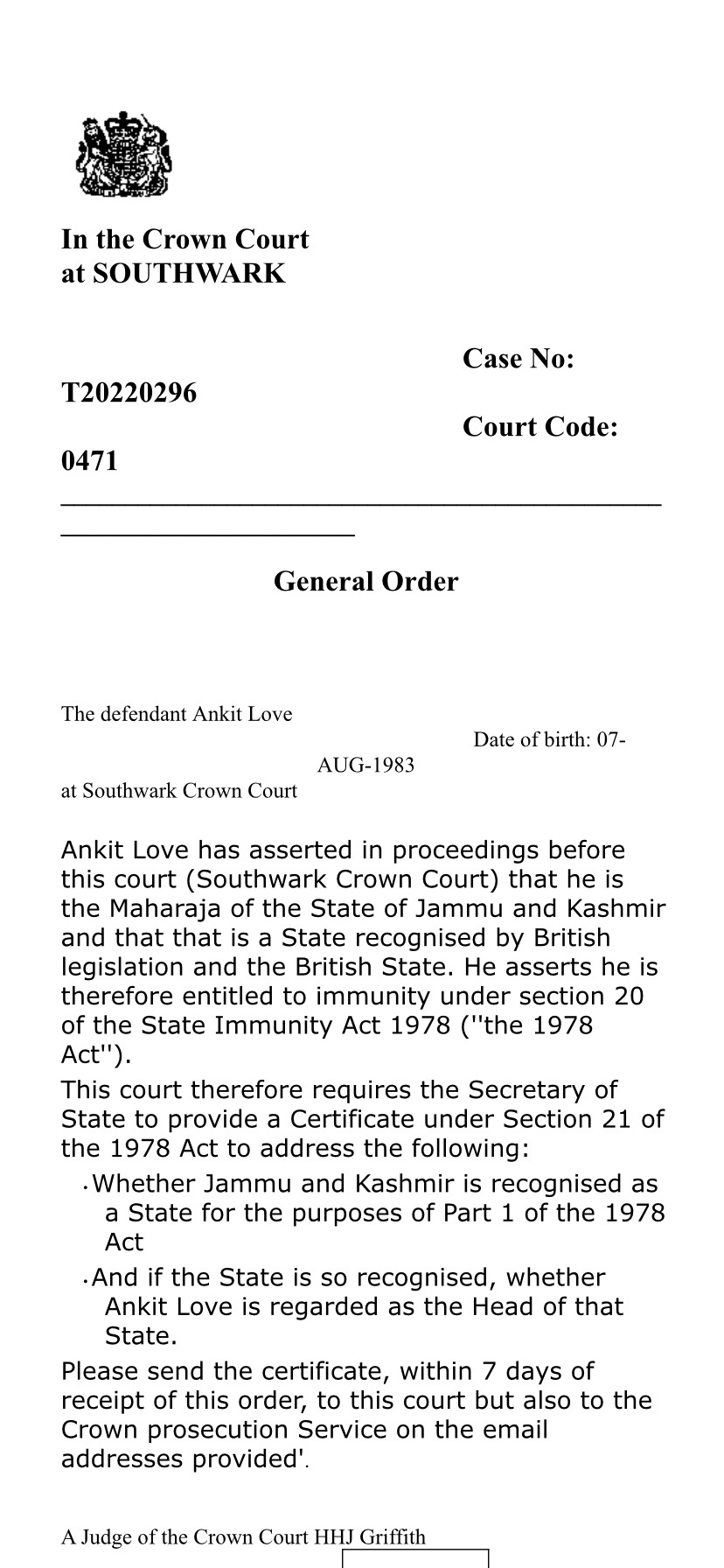
An example of a United Kingdom Crown Court order against the Secretary of State of the Foreign and Commonwealth office, in regards to the sovereignty of Jammu and Kashmir

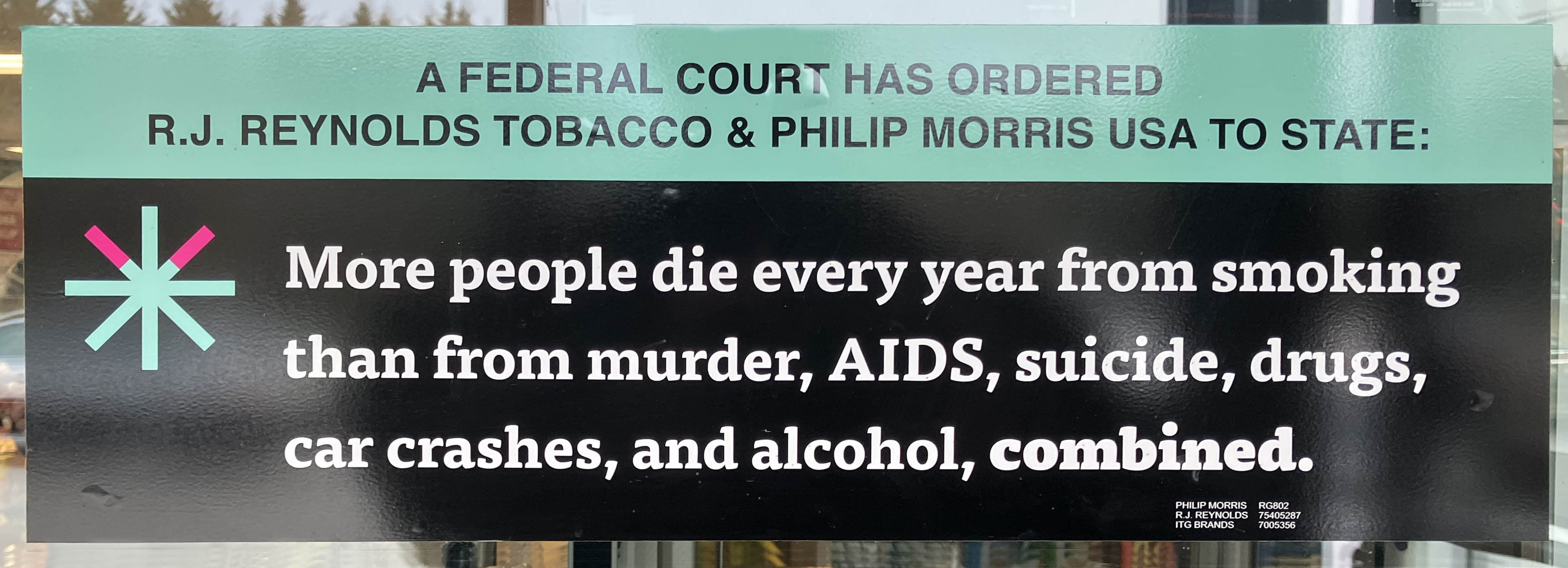
In addition to requiring warnings on cigarette packages, courts have ordered warning statements such as this one on the front window of a convenience store in the US.

A court order is an official proclamation by a judge (or panel of judges) that defines the legal relationships between the parties to a hearing, a trial, an appeal or other court proceedings. Such ruling requires or authorizes the carrying out of certain steps by one or more parties to a case. A court order must be signed by a judge; some jurisdictions may also require it to be notarized. A court order governs each case throughout its entirety. If an individual violates the court order, the judge may hold that person in contempt.

== Content ==
The content and provisions of a court order depend on the type of proceeding, the phase of the proceedings in which they are issued, and the procedural (Note: See e.g., criminal procedure, civil procedure) and evidentiary (Note: See e.g., federal rules of evidence) rules that govern the proceedings.

An order can be as simple as setting a date for trial or as complex as restructuring contractual relationships by and between many corporations in a multi-jurisdictional dispute. It may be a final order (one that concludes the court action), or an interim order (one during the action). Most orders are written, and are signed by the judge. Some orders, however, are spoken orally by the judge in open court, and are only reduced to writing in the transcript of the proceedings.

== Examples ==
The following represents a small sampling of matters that are commonly dictated by the terms of a court order:

- Child custody (United States) (United Kingdom)
- Child support (United States)
- Court dates (United States)
- Criminal sentences (United States)
- Divorce decree (United States)
- Emergency protective order (United States)
- Equitable remedy (United States) (United Kingdom)
- Gag order
- Injunction
- Lawsuit rulings (United States)
- Restitution and unjust enrichment
- Restraining order (United States) (United Kingdom)
- Search warrant (United States) (United Kingdom)
- Stay of execution (United States)
- Temporary protective order (United States) (Republic of Ireland)

=== U.S. interim order ===
One kind of interim court order is a temporary restraining order (TRO), to preserve the status quo. Such an order may later be overturned or vacated during the litigation; or it may become a final order and judgment, subject then to appeal.

In the area of domestic violence, U.S. courts will routinely issue a temporary order of protection (TOP, or temporary protective order, TPO) to prevent any further violence or threat of violence.

In family law, temporary orders can also be called pendente lite relief and may include grants of temporary alimony, child custody, and/or visitation.

== See also ==
- Anti-social behaviour order (United Kingdom)
- Drinking Banning Order (England) (Wales) (Scotland)
- Hearing (law)
- Judge
- Lawburrows (Scotland)
- Lawsuit
- Trial
