= Bank Notes (Scotland) Act 1765 =

Act of the Parliament of Great Britain

Bank Notes (Scotland) Act 1765 (Note: The citation of this act by this short title was authorised by section 1 of, and the first schedule to, the Short Titles Act 1896. Due to the repeal of those provisions it is now authorised by section 19(2) of the Interpretation Act 1978.)
- Act of Parliament
- Parliament of Great Britain
- Long title: An Act to prevent the Inconveniencies arising from the present Method of issuing Notes and Bills by the Banks, Banking Companies, and Bankers, in that Part of Great Britain called Scotland.
- Citation: 5 Geo. 3. c. 49
- Territorial extent: Scotland (Note: Section 1.)

Dates
- Royal assent: 25 May 1765
- Commencement: 15 May 1766
- Repealed: 5 November 1993

Other legislation
- Amended by: Statute Law Revision Act 1867; Statute Law Revision Act 1871; Statute Law Revision Act 1888; Statute Law Revision Act 1948; Common Informers Act 1951; Statute Law Revision Act 1964; Statute Law (Repeals) Act 1973; Debtors (Scotland) Act 1987
- Repealed by: Statute Law (Repeals) Act 1993

Status: Repealed

Text of statute as originally enacted

Revised text of statute as amended

The Bank Notes (Scotland) Act 1765 (5 Geo. 3. c. 49) was an act of the Parliament of Great Britain that introduced restrictions on the use of banknotes by the Scottish banks. The act was from the fourth session of the twelfth Parliament of Great Britain at Westminster; beginning May 19, 1761 and lasting until January 10, 1765.

The Bank of Scotland had introduced an "optional clause" on their banknotes in 1730 whereby its conversion into gold on demand could be delayed for up to 6 months, at which point the face value plus 5% should be payable. By the 1760s similar clauses were being adopted by the competitor banks in Scotland. An observed consequence was that in 1762–4 the banknotes had been trading at 4% below the gold coin value. Use of such clauses was prohibited by the 1765 Act.

The act also stipulated that banknotes should not be issued for sums under £1. Prior to the act, some banks had been issuing notes for amounts as low as one shilling or even one penny.

== Subsequent developments ==
Section 8 of the act was repealed by section 1 of, and the schedule to, the Statute Law Revision Act 1871 (34 & 35 Vict. c. 116), which came into force on 21 August 1871.

Section 2 and in sections 4, 5 and 6, the words " post bill ", " post bills " and " or post bills ", wherever occurring, were repealed by section 1(1) of, and part IV of schedule 1 to, the Statute Law (Repeals) Act 1973, which came into force on 18 July 1973.

The whole act was repealed by section 1(1) of, and group 1 of part IX of schedule 1 to, the Statute Law (Repeals) Act 1993, which came into force on 5 November 1993.
