= List of acts of the Parliament of Scotland from 1621 =

This is a list of acts of the Parliament of Scotland for the year 1621.

It lists acts of Parliament of the old Parliament of Scotland, that was merged with the old Parliament of England to form the Parliament of Great Britain, by the Union with England Act 1707 (c. 7).

For other years, see list of acts of the Parliament of Scotland. For the period after 1707, see list of acts of the Parliament of Great Britain.

== 1621 ==
The 23rd parliament of James VI, held in Edinburgh from 1 June 1621.

Short title, or popular name	Citation	Royal assent
Long title
Articles of Perth Act 1621 (repealed)	1621 c. 1 (Note: This is the citation in the Record Edition.); 1621 c. 1 (Note: This is the citation in the Duodecimal Edition.)	4 August 1621
A Ratificatioun of the fyve articles of the General Assemblie of the kirk haldin at Pearthe in the moneth of August 1618. (Repealed by Confession of Faith Ratification Act 1690 (c. 7))
Supply Act 1621 (repealed)	1621 c. 2; 1621 c. 2	4 August 1621
Anent the taxatioun grantit to his Majestie of threttie schillingis termelie upone the pound land and the tuentie pennie of all annuelrentis. (Repealed by Statute Law Revision (Scotland) Act 1906 (6 Edw. 7. c. 38))
Supply (No. 2) Act 1621 (repealed)	1621 c. 3; 1621 c. 3	4 August 1621
Anent the collecting and inbringing of the taxatione and releif to prelatis. (Repealed by Statute Law Revision (Scotland) Act 1906 (6 Edw. 7. c. 38))
Ratification Act 1621 (repealed)	1621 c. 4; 1621 c. 4	4 August 1621
Ane act of ratieficatioun in favouris of the prince his hieghnes. (Repealed by Statute Law Revision (Scotland) Act 1906 (6 Edw. 7. c. 38))
Plantation of Kirks Act 1621 (repealed)	1621 c. 5; 1621 c. 5	4 August 1621
Anent the plantatioun of kirkis as yet unplantit. (Repealed by Statute Law Revision (Scotland) Act 1964 (c. 80))
Diligence Act 1621 (repealed)	1621 c. 6; 1621 c. 6	4 August 1621
Act anent Comprysingis. (Repealed by Bankruptcy and Diligence etc. (Scotland) Act 2007 (asp 3))
Adjudication Act 1621 (repealed)	1621 c. 7; 1621 c. 7	4 August 1621
Anent adiudicatiounes. (Repealed by Bankruptcy and Diligence etc. (Scotland) Act 2007 (asp 3))
Registration Act 1621 (repealed)	1621 c. 8; 1621 c. 8	4 August 1621
Anent the extractis of infeftmentis past upone comprysingis furth of the previe seale where the same ar not registrated at the great seall. (Repealed by Statute Law Revision (Scotland) Act 1906 (6 Edw. 7. c. 38))
Feuing by Bishops Act 1621 (repealed)	1621 c. 9; 1621 c. 9	4 August 1621
Anent geving of licience to bischopes to sett thair warde landis in fewferme. (Repealed by Statute Law Revision (Scotland) Act 1906 (6 Edw. 7. c. 38))
Glebes to be Teind Free Act 1621 (repealed)	1621 c. 10; 1621 c. 10	4 August 1621
Act declaring summes grasse gevin to the ministeris for thair gleibis to be teyndfrie. (Repealed by Statute Law Revision (Scotland) Act 1964 (c. 80))
Restitution of Chapters Act 1621 (repealed)	1621 c. 11; 1621 c. 11	4 August 1621
Ratificatioun and additioun to the act of Parliament made anent restitution of cheptoures. (Repealed by Statute Law Revision (Scotland) Act 1906 (6 Edw. 7. c. 38))
Packing and Peeling Act 1621 (repealed)	1621 c. 12; 1621 c. 12	4 August 1621
Anent packeing and peeling. (Repealed by Statute Law Revision (Scotland) Act 1906 (6 Edw. 7. c. 38))
Protections Act 1621 (repealed)	1621 c. 13; 1621 c. 13	4 August 1621
Anent the dischargeing of protectiounis. (Repealed by Statute Law Revision (Scotland) Act 1906 (6 Edw. 7. c. 38))
Gaming Act 1621 (repealed)	1621 c. 14; 1621 c. 14	4 August 1621
Anent playing at cardes and dyce and horse races. (Repealed by Betting and Gaming Act 1960 (8 & 9 Eliz. 2. c. 60))
Church Lands Act 1621 (repealed)	1621 c. 15; 1621 c. 15	4 August 1621
Act declaring all takis set for longer space nor thrie yeiris without consent of the patrone be persones under the degrie of prelattis since 1594 to be null. (Repealed by Statute Law Revision (Scotland) Act 1906 (6 Edw. 7. c. 38))
Measures Act 1621 (repealed)	1621 c. 16; 1621 c. 16	4 August 1621
Anent metis and measures. (Repealed by Statute Law Revision (Scotland) Act 1906 (6 Edw. 7. c. 38))
Sale by Measure Act 1621 (repealed)	1621 c. 17; 1621 c. 17	4 August 1621
Anent the dischargeing of a peck to the boll. (Repealed by Statute Law Revision (Scotland) Act 1906 (6 Edw. 7. c. 38))
Bankruptcy Act 1621 (repealed)	1621 c. 18; 1621 c. 18	4 August 1621
A ratificatioun of the act of the lordis of counsell and Sessioun made in Julii 1620 aganis unlauchfull dispositiones and alienationis made be dyvoures and banckruptis. (Repealed by Bankruptcy (Scotland) Act 1985 (c. 66))
Table of Fees Act 1621 (repealed)	1621 c. 19; 1621 c. 19	4 August 1621
Ratificatioun of the act of Counsell anent the pryces of wreates sealis &c. made 1606. (Repealed by Statute Law Revision (Scotland) Act 1906 (6 Edw. 7. c. 38))
Hornings Act 1621 (repealed)	1621 c. 20; 1621 c. 20	4 August 1621
Act ordaning annuelrent to be dew efter Horning. (Repealed by Debtors (Scotland) Act 1987 (c. 18))
Servants Act 1621 (repealed)	1621 c. 21; 1621 c. 21	4 August 1621
Anent servandis going lowse and leving thair maisteris service. (Repealed by Statute Law Revision (Scotland) Act 1906 (6 Edw. 7. c. 38))
Forgery Act 1621 (repealed)	1621 c. 22; 1621 c. 22	4 August 1621
Anent counterfuteing and making of fals wreatis. (Repealed by Statute Law Revision (Scotland) Act 1964 (c. 80))
Pardon Act 1621 (repealed)	1621 c. 23; 1621 c. 23	4 August 1621
A generall pardoun for deidis done aganis penall statutes sum few excepted and a discharge of James Cranstoun his commissioun. (Repealed by Statute Law Revision (Scotland) Act 1906 (6 Edw. 7. c. 38))
Registration Act 1621 (repealed)	1621 c. 24; 1621 c. 24	4 August 1621
Anent evidentis past the gryit seale quhilkis ar not registrated. (Repealed by Statute Law Revision (Scotland) Act 1906 (6 Edw. 7. c. 38))
Sumptuary Act 1621 (repealed)	1621 c. 25; 1621 c. 25	4 August 1621
Anent banqueting and apparell. (Repealed by Statute Law Revision (Scotland) Act 1906 (6 Edw. 7. c. 38))
Houses in Edinburgh Act 1621 (repealed)	1621 c. 26; 1621 c. 26	4 August 1621
Anent thaicking of houses in Edinburgh with sklate and skailyee. (Repealed by Statute Law Revision (Scotland) Act 1906 (6 Edw. 7. c. 38))
Comprisings Act 1621 (repealed)	1621 c. 27; 1621 c. 27	4 August 1621
Anent compryseing frome appeirand airis extendit alsweill to menis awin dettis as thair predicessouris. (Repealed by Statute Law Revision (Scotland) Act 1906 (6 Edw. 7. c. 38))
Usury Act 1621 (repealed)	1621 c. 28; 1621 c. 28	4 August 1621
Anent taking of annuelrent before hand to be usurie. (Repealed by Statute Law Revision (Scotland) Act 1906 (6 Edw. 7. c. 38))
Tradesmen Act 1621 (repealed)	1621 c. 29; 1621 c. 29	4 August 1621
Ratificatione of the act of Secreit Counsell aganis baxteris brewstaris flescheouris and candlemakeris of Edinburgh. (Repealed by Statute Law Revision (Scotland) Act 1906 (6 Edw. 7. c. 38))
Game Act 1621 (repealed)	1621 c. 30; 1621 c. 30	4 August 1621
Act restrayning the bying and selling certane wyild foullis. (Repealed by Statute Law Revision (Scotland) Act 1906 (6 Edw. 7. c. 38))
Hunting and Hawking Act 1621 (repealed)	1621 c. 31; 1621 c. 31	4 August 1621
Act Anent Hunting and Haulking. (Repealed by Statute Law Revision (Scotland) Act 1964 (c. 80))
Hunting and Hawking (No. 2) Act 1621 (repealed)	1621 c. 32; 1621 c. 32	4 August 1621
Anent the harreing of haulk nestis and hounting in snaw. (Repealed by Statute Law Revision (Scotland) Act 1906 (6 Edw. 7. c. 38))
Saving the Rights Act 1621Not public and general	1621 c. 33; 1621 c. 33	4 August 1621
Act Salvo Jure cujuslibet.
Money Act 1621 (repealed)	1621 c. 34 — (Note: This act is not listed in the Duodecimal Edition.)	4 August 1621
Commissioun anent moneyis. (Repealed by Statute Law Revision (Scotland) Act 1906 (6 Edw. 7. c. 38))
Supply (No. 3) Act 1621 (repealed)	1621 c. 35 —	4 August 1621
Commissioun anent the taxt roll within the schirrefdome of Kincardin. (Repealed by Statute Law Revision (Scotland) Act 1906 (6 Edw. 7. c. 38))
Mines and Minerals Act 1621 (repealed)	1621 c. 36 —	4 August 1621
Commissione anent coallis and coilheughis. (Repealed by Statute Law Revision (Scotland) Act 1906 (6 Edw. 7. c. 38))
Commission as to Erected Prelacies Act 1621 (repealed)	1621 c. 37 —	4 August 1621
Commissioun for modiefeing blenche dewties and ministeris stependis in erected prelacies. (Repealed by Statute Law Revision (Scotland) Act 1906 (6 Edw. 7. c. 38))
Measurers Act 1621 (repealed)	1621 c. 38 —	4 August 1621
Reference to the Secreit Counsell anent metsteris. (Repealed by Statute Law Revision (Scotland) Act 1906 (6 Edw. 7. c. 38))
Edinburgh Water Supply Act 1621 (repealed)	1621 c. 39 —	4 August 1621
Another anent the inbringing of water to Edinburgh. (Repealed by Statute Law Revision (Scotland) Act 1906 (6 Edw. 7. c. 38))
Not public and general	1621 c. 40 —	4 August 1621
No record of this act is preserved.
Not public and general	1621 c. 41 —	4 August 1621
No record of this act is preserved.
Not public and general	1621 c. 42 —	4 August 1621
No record of this act is preserved.
Not public and general	1621 c. 43 —	4 August 1621
Ane ratificatioun in favoures of the Merques of Hammiltoun.
Not public and general	1621 c. 44 —	4 August 1621
Ane act uniting the provestrie of Kirkheuch unto the archebischoprik of S_{t} Andros with dyvers exceptiounes.
Not public and general	1621 c. 45 —	4 August 1621
Ratificatione in favoures of the Earle of Angous.
Not public and general	1621 c. 46 —	4 August 1621
Ane act in favores of the Earle off Nithisdale.
Not public and general	1621 c. 47 —	4 August 1621
Act in favoures of the Earle of Wintoun anent the regalitie of S^{t} Andros on the southe syid of Forthe.
Not public and general	1621 c. 48 —	4 August 1621
Ratificatioun and new dissolutioun of Jedburgh and Cannabie in favoures of the Erle off Home.
Not public and general	1621 c. 49 —	4 August 1621
Ratieficatioun in favoures of the Erle of Lowthiane.
Not public and general	1621 c. 50 —	4 August 1621
Ratificatione in favoures of the Earle of Roxburgh anent Kelso and Lesmahago with a new dissolutioun.
Not public and general	1621 c. 51 —	4 August 1621
Ratificatione in favoures of the Earle of Kellie.
Not public and general	1621 c. 52 —	4 August 1621
Ratificatioun in favouris of the Erle of Melros of his infeftment of Bynning.
Not public and general	1621 c. 53 —	4 August 1621
Ane uther of the Erle of Melros of his in feftment of Melros with a new dissolutioun.
Not public and general	1621 c. 54 —	4 August 1621
Act in favoures of the Vicount Lauderdaill anent Boltoun.
Not public and general	1621 c. 55 —	4 August 1621
Dissolutioun of the pryorie of Hadington in favoures of the M^{r} of Lauderdaill.
Not public and general	1621 c. 56 —	4 August 1621
Dissolutioun of the pryorie of Cauldstreame in favoures of S^{r} Jhone Hammiltoun of Trabroun knycht.
Not public and general	1621 c. 57 —	4 August 1621
Annexatioun of the chapell royall to the bischopricke of Dumblane.
Not public and general	1621 c. 58 —	4 August 1621
Ratificatioun to Alex^{r} bischope of Dunkeld of his infeftment of Baltroddie.
Not public and general	1621 c. 59 —	4 August 1621
Ratificatione to the bischope of Dumblane of his infeftment of Kinnuchare.
Not public and general	1621 c. 60 —	4 August 1621
Dissolutioun of the kirk of Kilmachormuk fra the abbacie of Kilwynning and unione thairof to the bischoprik off Argyill.
Not public and general	1621 c. 61 —	4 August 1621
Act in favoures of the lord Kilmaweris anent the kirk of Dreghorne.
Not public and general	1621 c. 62 —	4 August 1621
Ratificatioun in favouris of the lord Spynie.
Not public and general	1621 c. 63 —	4 August 1621
Ratificatioun in favouris of the lord Lowdoun of his infeftment of Kyillismure &c.
Not public and general	1621 c. 64 —	4 August 1621
Ratificatioun to the lord Scone of his infeftment of Drumduffe &c.
Not public and general	1621 c. 65 —	4 August 1621
Act in favoures of S^{r} Andro Ker.
Not public and general	1621 c. 66 —	4 August 1621
Ratificatioun to the lord Carnegye of his baronye of Ferne &c.
Not public and general	1621 c. 67 —	4 August 1621
Act in favouris of Jhone Stewart anent his rehabilitatioun.
Not public and general	1621 c. 68 —	4 August 1621
Erectioun of Coldinghame in favoures of Johne Stewart.
Not public and general		4 August 1621
S^{r} George Homes protestatione aganis Johne Stewartis erectione of Coldinghame.
Not public and general	1621 c. 69 —	4 August 1621
Act in favoures of S^{r} Richert Cockburne lord Previe Seill.
Not public and general	1621 c. 70 —	4 August 1621
Ratificatioun to S^{r} Robert Meluill of his infeftment of Lethame and Monymaill &c.
Not public and general	1621 c. 71 —	4 August 1621
Ratificatioun to S^{r} George Haye off his infeftment of Kinfawnis.
Not public and general	1621 c. 72 —	4 August 1621
Ratificatione to S^{r} William Oliphant and his sones of thair infeftmentis of dyvers landis.
Not public and general	1621 c. 73 —	4 August 1621
Act in favoures of S^{r} Andro Hammiltoun of Reidhous.
Not public and general	1621 c. 74 —	4 August 1621
Ratificatioun in favoures of Jhonne Murray of Lochmaben of tuo infeftmentis.
Not public and general	1621 c. 75 —	4 August 1621
Ratificatione in favoures of Jhone Levingstoun of his infeftment of Kynnairde.
Not public and general	1621 c. 76 —	4 August 1621
Ratificatioun in favouris of John Auchmowtie of his infeftment of Scougall.
Not public and general	1621 c. 77 —	4 August 1621
Ratieficatioun of dyvers infeftmentis grantit to the toun of Edinburgh.
Not public and general	1621 c. 78 —	4 August 1621
Ratificatione to the toun of Edinburgh of the libertie of beiring off a sworde of justiciarie of peace of unlawis the excyse of vine the jadgerie &c.
Not public and general	1621 c. 79 —	4 August 1621
Ratificatioun of divers infeftmentis grantit to the toun of Edinburgh for sustenation of colledge Ministeris and hospitallis.
Not public and general	1621 c. 80 —	4 August 1621
Act disjoyning tho pairtis lying within the poirtis of Edinburgh frome S^{t} Cuthbert and Halierudhous.
King's Castles Act 1621 (repealed)	1621 c. 81 —	4 August 1621
Act in favoures off the Keiparis of the kingis castellis. (Repealed by Statute Law Revision (Scotland) Act 1906 (6 Edw. 7. c. 38))
Burghs Act 1621 (repealed)	1621 c. 82 —	4 August 1621
Declaratioun in favouris of utheris burrowis anent the actis grantit in favoures of Edinburgh. (Repealed by Statute Law Revision (Scotland) Act 1906 (6 Edw. 7. c. 38))
Not public and general	1621 c. 83 —	4 August 1621
Ratificatioun in favoures of M_{r} Alex^{r} Gibsone laird of Durye.
Not public and general	1621 c. 84 —	4 August 1621
Ratificatioun in favoures of the laird of Wauchtoun.
Not public and general	1621 c. 85 —	4 August 1621
Act in favouris of the laird of Lochinvare.
Not public and general	1621 c. 86 —	4 August 1621
Act in favoures of the laird off Caddell.
Not public and general	1621 c. 87 —	4 August 1621
Act in favoures of the laird of Quhittingame.
Not public and general	1621 c. 88 —	4 August 1621
Act in favoures of the laird of Corstorphine
Not public and general	1621 c. 89 —	4 August 1621
Act in favoures of the larde of Buchannane
Not public and general	1621 c. 90 —	4 August 1621
Act in favoures of the lairde of Sanctmonanes.
Not public and general	1621 c. 91 —	4 August 1621
Act in favoures of S^{r} Jhonne Scott of Scottistarvett.
Not public and general	1621 c. 92 —	4 August 1621
Act in favoures of Alex^{r} Cranstoun off Morestoun.
Not public and general	1621 c. 93 —	4 August 1621
Ane uther act in favoures of the said Alex^{r} Cranstoun.
Not public and general	1621 c. 94 —	4 August 1621
Act in favoures of the laird of Rochlaw.
Not public and general	1621 c. 95 —	4 August 1621
Act in favoures of William Berclay of Innergellie.
Not public and general	1621 c. 96 —	4 August 1621
Ratification to M^{r} Thomas Hope of Craig hall of his infeftment of Arnedye.
Not public and general	1621 c. 97 —	4 August 1621
Act anent the unione of the landis of Kynninmonth unto the kirk of Seres.
Not public and general	1621 c. 98 —	4 August 1621
Act in favoures of the universitie of Sanctandros.
Not public and general	1621 c. 99 —	4 August 1621
Act in favoures of M^{r} Williame Forbes of Craigievar.
Not public and general	1621 c. 100 —	4 August 1621
Licence to S^{r} George Hay anent selling off his irne.
Not public and general	1621 c. 101 —	4 August 1621
Ratificatioun to William Maxwell of his infeftment of Justingleyis and viccarage of Kirkbeane.
Not public and general	1621 c. 102 —	4 August 1621
Ratificatione of the gift of the chalmerlanrie of Fyiff grantit to umquhile S^{r} James Hay.
Not public and general	1621 c. 103 —	4 August 1621
Commissione to the Lordis of Sessione in favouris of my Lord Spynie.
Not public and general	1621 c. 104 —	4 August 1621
Act in favouris of James Winrame.
Not public and general	1621 c. 105 —	4 August 1621
Act in favouris of M^{r} Walter Quhytfurde anent the ministrie of Failfurde.
Not public and general	1621 c. 106 —	4 August 1621
Act in favoures of S^{r} George Home off Manderstoun.
Not public and general	1621 c. 107 —	4 August 1621
Act in favouris of M^{r} William Kellie.
Not public and general	1621 c. 108 —	4 August 1621
Act in favoures of Williame Dowglas of Caveris.
Not public and general	1621 c. 109 —	4 August 1621
Ratificatioun in favouris off the toun of Elgine.
Not public and general	1621 c. 110 —	4 August 1621
Act in favouris of S^{r} Johnne Campbell anent the kirk of Lowdoun.
Supply (No. 4) Act 1621 (repealed)	1621 c. 111 —	4 August 1621
Acceptatioun by the Parliament off the offer made by the extraordinarie Lordis off Sessioun anent thair taxatioun. (Repealed by Statute Law Revision (Scotland) Act 1906 (6 Edw. 7. c. 38))
Supply (No. 5) Act 1621 (repealed)	1621 c. 112 —	4 August 1621
Ane act and commissioun grantit by Parliament upoun the offer maid by the Advocatis and utheris memberis of the Colledge of Justice anent thair taxatioun. (Repealed by Statute Law Revision (Scotland) Act 1906 (6 Edw. 7. c. 38))
Not public and general	1621 c. 113 —	4 August 1621
Act in favouris of M^{r} Johnne Hay persone of Renfrew.
Clerks of Session Act 1621 (repealed)	1621 c. 114 —	4 August 1621
Ratificatioun in favouris of the Clerkis of Sessioun. (Repealed by Statute Law Revision (Scotland) Act 1906 (6 Edw. 7. c. 38))

=== Sources ===
- Alexander, William (1841). "Acta Parliamentorum Regis Jacobi Sexti". An Abridgement of the Acts of the Parliaments of Scotland. Edinburgh: Adam and Charles Black. pp. A43 – A45 – via Google Books.
- Alexander, William (1841). "Acta Parliamentorum Regis Jacobi Sexti". An Abridgement of the Acts of the Parliaments of Scotland. Edinburgh: Adam and Charles Black. pp. A43 – A45 – via Google Books.
- Chronological Table of the Statutes. London: Her Majesty's Stationery Office. 1972. pp. 1348–1349 – via Google Books.
- "Acts of the Old Scottish Parliament: 1621". legislation.gov.uk. The National Archives.
- "Index of Statutes: Index of Statutes: James VI (1567-1625)". Records of the Parliaments of Scotland to 1707. University of St Andrews.

== See also ==
- List of legislation in the United Kingdom
- Records of the Parliaments of Scotland
