= List of acts of the Parliament of Scotland from 1681 =

This is a list of acts of the Parliament of Scotland for the year 1681.

It lists acts of Parliament of the old Parliament of Scotland, that was merged with the old Parliament of England to form the Parliament of Great Britain, by the Union with England Act 1707 (c. 7).

For other years, see list of acts of the Parliament of Scotland. For the period after 1707, see list of acts of the Parliament of Great Britain.

== 1681 ==
The 3rd parliament of Charles II, held in Edinburgh from 28 July 1681.

Short title, or popular name	Citation	Royal assent
Long title
Protestant Religion Act 1681 (repealed)	1681 c. 1 (Note: This is the citation in the Record Edition.); 1681 c. 1 (Note: This is the citation in the Duodecimal Edition.)	13 August 1681
Act ratifieing all former Laws for the security of the Protestant Religion. Act ratifying all former Laws for the security of the Protestant Religion. (Repealed by Statute Law Revision (Scotland) Act 1906 (6 Edw. 7. c. 38))
Succession to Crown Act 1681 (repealed)	1681 c. 2; 1681 c. 2	13 August 1681
Act acknowledging and asserting the right of Succession to the Imperial Croun of Scotland. Act acknowledging and asserting the right of Succession to the Imperial Crown of Scotland. (Repealed by Confession of Faith Ratification Act 1690 (c. 7))
Supply Act 1681 (repealed)	1681 c. 3; 1681 c. 3	20 August 1681
Act for a voluntary Offer of a new Supplie to the Kings Majestie. Act for a voluntary Offer of a new Supply to the King's Majesty. (Repealed by Statute Law Revision (Scotland) Act 1906 (6 Edw. 7. c. 38))
Public Peace Act 1681 (repealed)	1681 c. 4; 1681 c. 4	29 August 1681
Act for secureing the Peace of the Countrie. Act for securing the Peace of the Country. (Repealed by Prelacy Act 1689 (June c. 4) and 1690 (c. 65))
Subscription of Deeds Act 1681 (repealed)	1681 c. 5; 1681 c. 5	29 August 1681
Act concerning probative witnesses in writs and Executions. Act concerning probative witnesses in writs and Executions. (Repealed by Requirements of Writing (Scotland) Act 1995 (c. 7))
Religion and the Test Act 1681 or the Scottish Test Act (repealed)	1681 c. 6 — (Note: This act is not listed in the Duodecimal Edition.)	31 August 1681
Act anent Religion and the Test. Act about Religion and the Test. (Repealed by Confession of Faith Ratification Act 1690 (c. 7) and Statute Law Repeal (No. 3) Act 1690 (c. 58))
Summer Session Act 1681 (repealed)	1681 c. 7; 1681 c. 7	2 September 1681
Act discharging the Summer-Session. Act discharging the Summer Session. (Repealed by Court of Session Act 1686 (c. 6))
Not public and general	1681 c. 8 —	2 September 1681
Act in favours of Sir Archibald Cockburn of Langtoun anent the office of Usher to the King. Act in favour of Sir Archibald Cockburn of Langton regarding the office of Usher to the King.
Not public and general	1681 c. 9 —	2 September 1681
Act in favors of Sir Archibald Cockburn of Langtoun for changing a High-way near the toun of Dunse. Act in favour of Sir Archibald Cockburn of Langton for changing the highway near the town of Duns.
Excise Act 1681 (repealed)	1681 c. 10; 1681 c. 8	6 September 1681
Act for continuation of the Excise. Act for continuation of the Excise. (Repealed by Statute Law Revision (Scotland) Act 1906 (6 Edw. 7. c. 38))
Personal Protections Act 1681 (repealed)	1681 c. 11; 1681 c. 9	6 September 1681
Act against personal Protections. Act against personal Protections. (Repealed by Statute Law Revision (Scotland) Act 1906 (6 Edw. 7. c. 38))
Terce Act 1681 (repealed)	1681 c. 12; 1681 c. 10	6 September 1681
Act concerning wives Terces. Act concerning wives' Terces. (Repealed by Succession (Scotland) Act 1964 (c. 41))
Registration Act 1681 (repealed)	1681 c. 13; 1681 c. 11	6 September 1681
Act concerning the registration of seisins and reversions of tenements within burgh. Act concerning the registration of seisins and reversions of tenements within burghs. (Repealed by Burgh Registers (Scotland) Act 1926 (16 & 17 Geo. 5. c. 50))
Not public and general	1681 c. 14 —	6 September 1681
Act in favors of William Earle of Queens berrie for disjoining the Lands of Polvaddock &c. from the Stewartrie of Kirkcudbright and annexing the same to the Shire of Dumfries.
Not public and general	1681 c. 15 —	6 September 1681
Ratification in favors of Charles Duke of Lennox and Richmond of the Dukedome of Lennox &c.
Not public and general	1681 c. 16 —	6 September 1681
Ratification in favors of John Marquis of Atholl of the office of Constabulary and keeping of the Castle of Kinclevin &c.
Not public and general	1681 c. 17 —	6 September 1681
Ratification in favors of James Marquis of Montrose &c. and William Earle of Mon teith and Airth.
Not public and general	1681 c. 18 —	6 September 1681
Ratification in favors of Archibald Earle of Argyle of the lands & barony of Dowart &c.
Not public and general	1681 c. 19 —	6 September 1681
Ratification in favors of James Earle of Perth and James Lord Drummond his son of the Earledome of Perth &c.
Not public and general	1681 c. 20 —	6 September 1681
Ratification in favors of David Viscount of Stormont &c. of the lands of Arngosk &c.
Not public and general	1681 c. 21 —	6 September 1681
Ratification in favors of Sir Alexander Seton of Pitmedden of the lands and barony of Orchardtoun &c.
Not public and general	1681 c. 22 —	6 September 1681
Ratification in favors of Sir Roger Hog of Harcarse of the lands of Harcarse &c.
Not public and general	1681 c. 23 —	6 September 1681
Ratification in favors of Sir George Gordon of Haddo of the lands and barony of Haddo.
Not public and general	1681 c. 24 —	6 September 1681
Ratification in favors of Sir William Sharp of Stoniehill knight of the lands of Naetoun &c.
Not public and general	1681 c. 25 —	6 September 1681
Ratification in favors of M_{r} Alexander Gibson of Paintland of the lands and ba rony of Paintland.
Not public and general	1681 c. 26 —	6 September 1681
Ratification in favors of M_{r} Alexander M^{c}keinzie of Gairloche of the barony of Gairloch &c.
Not public and general	1681 c. 27 —	6 September 1681
Ratification in favors of Andrew Spalding of Ashintully of the mains of Ashintully.
Not public and general	1681 c. 28 —	6 September 1681
Ratification in favors of David Drumond of Cultmalindie of the lands and barony of Cultmalindie.
Not public and general	1681 c. 29 —	6 September 1681
Ratification in favors of Donald Baine of Tulloch of the barony of Tulloch.
Not public and general	1681 c. 30 —	6 September 1681
Ratification in favors of the Trade and Incorporation of Hatmakers and Walkers of Edinburgh.
Not public and general	1681 c. 31 —	6 September 1681
Ratification in favors of M^{r} Roderick Mckeinzie of Findone of the Lands and barony of Findone.
Not public and general	1681 c. 32 —	6 September 1681
Ratification in favors of William Duff his Majesties Chamberlane in the Earledome of Ross of the lands of Drumcudden.
Not public and general	1681 c. 33 —	6 September 1681
Ratification in favors of Thomas Hay of Balhoussie of the lands & barony of Balhoussie.
Not public and general	1681 c. 34 —	6 September 1681
Ratification in favors of Robert Pringle of Cliftoun of the lands of Cliftoun &c.
Not public and general	1681 c. 35 —	6 September 1681
Ratification in favors of Sir William Ker of Greinhead of the town and lands of Softlaw &c.
Not public and general	1681 c. 36 —	6 September 1681
Ratification in favors of George Dallas of S^{t} Martines of the half of the lands of S^{t} Martines &c.
Not public and general	1681 c. 37 —	6 September 1681
Ratification in favors of Sir Archibald Cockburn of Langtoun of the lands and barony of Langtoun &c.
Not public and general	1681 c. 38 —	6 September 1681
Ratification in favors of the Poor of the Town and Burgh of the Chanonrie of Ross.
Not public and general	1681 c. 39 —	6 September 1681
Ratification in favors of Patrick Smith of Braco of the Lands Lordship and Barony of Methven &c.
Not public and general	1681 c. 40 —	6 September 1681
Ratification in favors of Mr Johne Omay minister at Dumbarny of the half of the lands of Monydie &c.
Not public and general	1681 c. 41 —	6 September 1681
Ratification in favors of Mr Thomas Skeen Advocat of the lands & barony of Prestoun.
Not public and general	1681 c. 42 —	6 September 1681
Ratification in favors of David Oliphant of Colcuquhar of the barony of Forgundeny &c.
Not public and general	1681 c. 43 —	6 September 1681
Ratification in favors of M^{r} James Murray Minister at Logierait of the lands of Easter and Wester Doullaries &c.
Not public and general	1681 c. 44 —	6 September 1681
Ratification in favors of William Colquhoun of Craigtoun of the lands of Craigtoun &c.
Not public and general	1681 c. 45 —	6 September 1681
Ratification in favors of Robert Boyd of Portincross of the lands of Arneill &c.
Not public and general	1681 c. 46 —	6 September 1681
Ratification in favors of Coline Campbell of Ormadill of the lands of Auchadaderriffe &c.
Not public and general	1681 c. 47 —	6 September 1681
Ratification in favors of M^{r} Alexander Forbes of Foverane of the barony of Foverane.
Not public and general	1681 c. 48 —	6 September 1681
Ratification in favours of Richard Elphingstoun of Airth of the lands & barony of Airth.
Not public and general	1681 c. 49 —	6 September 1681
Ratification in favors of Alexander Lord Forbes of Pitsligo of the burgh of barony of Roseheartie.
Not public and general	1681 c. 50 —	6 September 1681
Ratification in favors of John Skeen of that Ilk of the lands and barony of Skeen.
Not public and general	1681 c. 51 —	6 September 1681
Ratification in favors of Francis Dugud of Auchinhove of the lands and barony of Auchinhove.
Not public and general	1681 c. 52 —	6 September 1681
Ratification in favors of Thomas Fraser of Streichen of the lands & barony of Streichen.
Not public and general	1681 c. 53 —	6 September 1681
Ratification in favors of Alexander Forbes of Ballogie of the lands & barony of Ballogie.
Not public and general	1681 c. 54 —	6 September 1681
Ratification in favors of Mr James Elphingstone writer to the Signet of the lands of Logie Durnoch &c.
Not public and general	1681 c. 55 —	6 September 1681
Ratification in favors of John Grahame of Claverhouse of the barony of Ogilvie.
Not public and general	1681 c. 56 —	6 September 1681
Ratification in favors of John Grahame of Claverhouse of the barony of Freugh &c.
Not public and general	1681 c. 57 —	6 September 1681
Ratification in favors of Mr James Carnegie Minister at Rogortoun of the half of the toun and lands of Ardoch.
Not public and general	1681 c. 58 —	6 September 1681
Ratification in favors of Mr Patrick Keir of Kinmonth of the half of the lands of Kinmonth.
Not public and general	1681 c. 59 —	6 September 1681
Ratification in favors of Anthonie Murray of Dullarie of the lands of Raith &c.
Not public and general	1681 c. 60 —	6 September 1681
Ratification in favors of John Brown of Braid of the lands and barony of Braid.
Not public and general	1681 c. 61 —	6 September 1681
Ratification in favors of Mr James Brand younger of Babertoun of the Lands of Reidhall &c.
Not public and general	1681 c. 62 —	6 September 1681
Ratification in favors of Lieutennent Collonell Maine, Major Theophilus Ogil =thorp and Captain Henry Cornwall, of the lands and barony of Earlestoun and others.
Not public and general	1681 c. 63 —	6 September 1681
Ratification in favors of Mr Thomas Innes and James Calder of Muirton of the lands of Struthers &c.
Not public and general	1681 c. 64 —	6 September 1681
Ratification in favors of James Calder of Muirtoun of the half coble Salmond fishing upon the water of Inverspey.
Not public and general	1681 c. 65 —	6 September 1681
Ratification in favors of Thomas Moncreiff of that Ilk of the lands and barony of Moncreiff.
Not public and general	1681 c. 66 —	6 September 1681
Ratification in favors of Mistres Grissel Mercer Ladie Aldie of the lands and barony of Meiklour.
Not public and general	1681 c. 67 —	6 September 1681
Ratification in favors of George Marquess of Huntlie &c. of the Marquisate Earle dome Lordship and Barony of Huntlie.
Not public and general	1681 c. 68 —	6 September 1681
Ratification in favors of Sir Richard Maitland of Pittrichie of the Lands and Baronies of Geight and Auchincreive.
Not public and general	1681 c. 69 —	6 September 1681
Ratification in favors of the Incorporation of Hammermen of Edinburgh of their priviledges.
Not public and general	1681 c. 70 —	6 September 1681
Ratification in favors of William Earle of Dumfreis and Charles Lord Crichtoun of a decreit annulling the erection of the new kirk of Cumnock and of a Decreit prorogating a tack of the teinds of the parochin of Cumnock.
Not public and general	1681 c. 71 —	6 September 1681
Ratification in favors of Sir James Dalrymple of Stair President of the Session of the lands and barony of Stair and of the barony of Dalmellington.
Not public and general	1681 c. 72 —	6 September 1681
Ratification in favors of Charles Maitland of Haltoun the Lord Thesaurer deput of the barony of Dundee &c.
Not public and general	1681 c. 73 —	6 September 1681
Ratification in favors of Mungo Halden of Glenagies of the lands & barony of Glenagies.
Not public and general	1681 c. 74 —	6 September 1681
Ratification in favours of Walter Riddel and of M^{r} Gilbert Elliot of several chartors and infeftments of the lands and barony of Minto.
Not public and general	1681 c. 75 —	6 September 1681
Ratification in favors of George Gordoun of Boigs of Darley of the lands of Boigs of Darley &c.
Not public and general	1681 c. 76 —	6 September 1681
Ratification in favors of Sir John Schaw of Greenock of the lands & barony of Greenock.
Not public and general	1681 c. 77 —	6 September 1681
Act in favors of James Earle of Airly against M^{r} John Dempster of Pitliver anent a Prescription.
Trade Act 1681 (repealed)	1681 c. 78; 1681 c. 12	9 September 1681
Act for encouraging Trade and Manufacturies. Act for encouraging Trade and Manufacturing. (Repealed by Statute Law Revision (Scotland) Act 1906 (6 Edw. 7. c. 38))
Declinature Act 1681 still in force	1681 c. 79; 1681 c. 13	13 September 1681
Act concerning Declinatures. Act concerning Declinatures.
Sumptuary Act 1681 (repealed)	1681 c. 80; 1681 c. 15	13 September 1681
Act restraining the exorbitant expence of Marriages Baptisms and Burials. Act restraining the exorbitant expense of Marriages, Baptisms and Burials. (Repealed by Statute Law Revision (Scotland) Act 1906 (6 Edw. 7. c. 38))
Assassinations Act 1681 (repealed)	1681 c. 81; 1681 c. 15	13 September 1681
Act against Assassinations. Act against Assassinations. (Repealed by Statute Law Revision (Scotland) Act 1906 (6 Edw. 7. c. 38))
Admiralty Court Act 1681 (repealed)	1681 c. 82; 1681 c. 16	14 September 1681
Act concerning the Jurisdiction of the Admiral Court. Act concerning the Jurisdiction of the Admiralty Court. (Repealed by Statute Law Revision (Scotland) Act 1964 (c. 80))
Judicial Sale Act 1681 (repealed)	1681 c. 83; 1681 c. 17	14 September 1681
Act concerning the Sale of Bankrupts Lands. Act concerning the Sale of Bankrupts' Lands. (Repealed by Statute Law (Repeals) Act 1973 (c. 39))
Royal Prerogative Act 1681 (repealed)	1681 c. 84; 1681 c. 18	16 September 1681
Act asserting His Majesties Prerogative in point of Jurisdiction. Act asserting His Majesty's Prerogative in point of Jurisdiction. (Repealed by Statute Law Repeal (No. 3) Act 1690 (c. 58))
Oaths of Minors Act 1681 (repealed)	1681 c. 85; 1681 c. 19	16 September 1681
Act concerning the Oaths of Minors. Act concerning the Oaths of Minors. (Repealed by Age of Legal Capacity (Scotland) Act 1991 (c. 50))
Bills of Exchange Act 1681 still in force	1681 c. 86; 1681 c. 20	16 September 1681
Act concerning Bills of Exchange. Act concerning Bills of Exchange.
Election of Commissioners Act 1681 (repealed)	1681 c. 87; 1681 c. 21	17 September 1681
Act concerning the Election of Commissioners for Shires. Act concerning the Election of Commissioners for Shires. (Repealed by Statute Law Revision (Scotland) Act 1906 (6 Edw. 7. c. 38))
Quorum of Justice Court Act 1681 (repealed)	1681 c. 88; 1681 c. 22	17 September 1681
Act appointing the Quorum of the Justice Court in time of Vacance. Act appointing the Quorum of the Justice Court in time of Vacancy. (Repealed by Statute Law Revision (Scotland) Act 1906 (6 Edw. 7. c. 38))
St. Andrews University Act 1681 (repealed)	1681 c. 89; 1681 c. 23	17 September 1681
Act in favours of the Universitie of Saint Andrews appointing halfe a Moneths Cess to be raised for their use. Act in favour of the University of Saint Andrews, appointing half a Month's Cess to be raised for their use. (Repealed by Statute Law Revision (Scotland) Act 1906 (6 Edw. 7. c. 38))
Bread and Meat Act 1681 (repealed)	1681 c. 90; 1681 c. 24	17 September 1681
Act ordaining Bread and Butcher-flesh, to be sold by Weight. Act ordaining Bread and Meat, to be sold by Weight. (Repealed by Statute Law Revision (Scotland) Act 1906 (6 Edw. 7. c. 38))
Test Act 1681 (repealed)	1681 c. 91; 1681 c. 25	17 September 1681
Additional Act concerning the Test. Additional Act concerning the Test. (Repealed by Statute Law Revision (Scotland) Act 1906 (6 Edw. 7. c. 38))
Public Debt Act 1681 (repealed)	1681 c. 92; 1681 c. 26	17 September 1681
Act concerning Publick Debts. Act concerning Public Debts. (Repealed by Statute Law Revision (Scotland) Act 1906 (6 Edw. 7. c. 38))
Salt Act 1681 (repealed)	1681 c. 93; 1681 c. 27	17 September 1681
Act anent the prices of French and Spanish Salt. Act regarding the price of French and Spanish Salt. (Repealed by Statute Law Revision (Scotland) Act 1906 (6 Edw. 7. c. 38))
Revision of Laws Act 1681 (repealed)	1681 c. 94 —	17 September 1681
Commission for revising the Laws. Commission for revising the Laws. (Repealed by Statute Law Revision (Scotland) Act 1906 (6 Edw. 7. c. 38))
Lyon King at Arms Act 1681 (repealed)	1681 c. 95 —	17 September 1681
Act anent the Lyone King at Arms. Act about the Lyon King at Arms. (Repealed by Statute Law Revision (Scotland) Act 1906 (6 Edw. 7. c. 38))
Not public and general	1681 c. 96 —	17 September 1681
Act in favors of the Town of Edinburgh anent the Conduit of water brought therto.
Thatching Houses Act 1681 (repealed)	1681 c. 97 —	17 September 1681
Act anent theiking of Houses in Edinburgh and some other Burghs Royall with Lead Sclates &c. Act about the roofing of Houses in Edinburgh and some other Royal Burghs with Lead, Slates, etc. (Repealed by Statute Law Revision (Scotland) Act 1906 (6 Edw. 7. c. 38))
Not public and general	1681 c. 98 —	17 September 1681
Act anent the Mortification made by Thomas Mudie of Dalry for Building a Kirk in Edinburgh.
Not public and general	1681 c. 99 —	17 September 1681
Act and Commission in favors of William Earle of Queensberrie anent the deliverie of ane blank band alleged to be in Barkskimings Chartor-Chist.
Not public and general	1681 c. 100 —	17 September 1681
Act in favors of the Shire and Burgh of Dumfreis anent a Custome upon the water of Nith.
Nyth Salmon Fishing (Scotland) Act 1681; Not public and general (repealed)	1681 c. 101 —	17 September 1681
Act anent the Salmond fishing in the water of Nith. Act about the Salmon fishing in the water of Nith. (Repealed by Nyth Salmon Fishing (Scotland) Act 1681 Repeal Act 1759 (33 Geo. 2. c. 21 Pr.)
Not public and general	1681 c. 102 —	17 September 1681
Act in favors of the Commissioners of the shire of Dumfreis anent their Fees. Act in favour of the Commissioners of the shire of Dumfries about their Fees.
Not public and general	1681 c. 103 —	17 September 1681
Act declaring the suggarworks at Glasgow to be a Manufactury. Act declaring the sugarworks at Glasgow to be a Manufactory.
Not public and general	1681 c. 104 —	17 September 1681
Act declaring the woolen work of Searge called Searge de Mein and other Stuffs erected be James Armonr, to be a Manufactury.
Not public and general	1681 c. 105 —	17 September 1681
Act in favors of George Earle of Wintoun anent the disjunction of the lands of Wintoun from Pencaitland and annexing the same to Tranent and for exeeming his Coal and Salt from publict burdings.
Not public and general	1681 c. 106 —	17 September 1681
Act and Decreit in favors of Lady Lockhart, against Cromwell Lockhart of Lee her sone. Act and Decree in favour of Lady Lockhart, against Cromwell Lockhart of Lee, her son.
Not public and general	1681 c. 107 —	17 September 1681
Act and Remit to the Convention of Burrows in favors of the Town of S_{t} Andrews, Anent their proportion of Stent. Act and Referral to the Convention of Burghs in favour of the Town of St. Andrews, Regarding their proportion of Stent.
Coal and Salt Act 1681 (repealed)	1681 c. 108 —	17 September 1681
Act for rectification of valuations of the Shires and declaring Coal and Salt not to bear any part of the supplie. (Repealed by Statute Law Revision (Scotland) Act 1964 (c. 80))
Advocates, etc. Act 1681 (repealed)	1681 c. 109 —	17 September 1681
Act rescinding some Articles of the Regulation concerning Advocats, Clerks, & Writers. Act rescinding some Articles of the Regulations concerning Advocates, Clerks, and Writers. (Repealed by Statute Law Revision (Scotland) Act 1906 (6 Edw. 7. c. 38))
Not public and general	1681 c. 110 —	17 September 1681
Act in favors of the Burgh of Inverness, for exacting a small Custom at the Bridge thereof. Act in favour of the Burgh of Inverness, for exacting a small Custom at the Bridge thereof.
Not public and general	1681 c. 111 —	17 September 1681
Act in favors of Andrew Fraser of Kinmundie, for exacting a small Custom at the Bridge of Dye.
Not public and general	1681 c. 112 —	17 September 1681
Act in favors of John Marqueis of Atholl, for exacting a small Custom at the Bridge of Almond.
Not public and general	1681 c. 113 —	17 September 1681
Act in favors of Charles Earle of Marr, for exacting a small Custom at the Bridge of Tillibody.
Not public and general	1681 c. 114 —	17 September 1681
Act and Recommendation in favors of the Litsters of Edinburgh.
Not public and general	1681 c. 115 —	17 September 1681
Act and Warrand to John Hope of Hoptoun for changing a High-way at the Toun of Winchburgh.
Not public and general	1681 c. 116 —	17 September 1681
Act and Recommendation in favours of Mungo Grahame of Gorthie, for reparation of his losses.
Not public and general	1681 c. 117 —	17 September 1681
Protection to Mr William Dick grand son to the deceist Sir William Dick of Braid.
Not public and general	1681 c. 118 —	17 September 1681
Protection to Sir Andrew Dick Executor of the late Sir William Dick.
Not public and general	1681 c. 119 —	17 September 1681
Recommendation to the Councill in favours of the Toun of Dalkeith, anent their Bridge.
Not public and general	1681 c. 120 —	17 September 1681
Recommendation to the Privy Councill, in favours of Katherin Cant Ladie Comistoun.
Not public and general	1681 c. 121 —	17 September 1681
Reference to the Councill, anent the Earles of Caithnes and Braid Albain.
Not public and general	1681 c. 122 —	17 September 1681
Reference to the Councill, anent payment of the Cess by the Towns of Anstrutherwester and Kilrinnie.
Not public and general	1681 c. 123 —	17 September 1681
Reference to the Councill anent payment of the Cess by the Toun of Cromartie.
Not public and general	1681 c. 124 —	17 September 1681
Recommendation to the Lords of the Thesaurie in favors of the Lady Bogie relict of Sir John Weymes of Bogie.
Not public and general	1681 c. 125 —	17 September 1681
Ratification in favors of John Earle of Erroll of the Office of Great Constabularie of Scotland.
Not public and general	1681 c. 126 —	17 September 1681
Ratification in favors of William Earle of Queensberrie of the Earledome Lordship and Regality of Drumlanrig.
Not public and general	1681 c. 127 —	17 September 1681
Ratification in favors of Andrew Lord Rollo of the lands and barony of Duncrub.
Not public and general	1681 c. 128 —	17 September 1681
Ratification in favors of Sir George M^{c}Kenzie of Rosehaugh Lord Advovocat of the Lands of Killeane and others.
Not public and general	1681 c. 129 —	17 September 1681
Ratification in favors of Sir George M^{c}kenzie of Rosehaugh, Lord Advocat of the barony of Bute.
Not public and general	1681 c. 130 —	17 September 1681
Ratification in favors of Sir George M^{c}kenzie of Tarbet Sir Alex^{r} M^{c}Kenzie of Coull and Coline M^{c}Kenzie of Redcastle conjunctlie of the lands and baronies perteaning to umquhile George Earle of Seaforth.
Not public and general	1681 c. 131 —	17 September 1681
Ratification in favors of Sir George M^{c}Kenzie of Tarbett and John M^{c}Kenzie his sone of the Lands and Barony of Tarbet &c.
Not public and general	1681 c. 132 —	17 September 1681
Ratification in favors of Sir David Balfour of Forret of the lands of Easter and Wester Forret.
Not public and general	1681 c. 133 —	17 September 1681
Ratification in favors of the Lord Register of his Gift for printing the Acts and Ordinances of the Parliaments of Scotland &c.
Not public and general	1681 c. 134 —	17 September 1681
Ratification in favors of Collonell James Dowglas of the barony of Machrimoir.
Not public and general	1681 c. 135 —	17 September 1681
Ratification in favors of Sir William Paterson of his office of one of the two Clerks of His Majesties Privy Councill.
Not public and general	1681 c. 136 —	17 September 1681
Ratification in favors of Mr Patrick Menzies of his office of one of the two Clerks of His Majesties Privy Councill.
Not public and general	1681 c. 137 —	17 September 1681
Ratification in favors of his Majesties Master Smith Mason Wright and other Servants of their exemption from Taxations &c.
Not public and general	1681 c. 138 —	17 September 1681
Ratification in favours of William Craick of Arbigland of the lands of Duchraw &c.
Not public and general	1681 c. 139 —	17 September 1681
Ratification in favors of Robert Ferguson of Craigdarroch of the lands of Dunreggane and Barboy.
Not public and general	1681 c. 140 —	17 September 1681
Ratification in favors of the Incorporation of Weavers in Glasgow.
Not public and general	1681 c. 141 —	17 September 1681
Ratification in favours of the Burgh of Aberdeen of their Charters and Infeftments.
Not public and general	1681 c. 142 —	17 September 1681
Ratification in favors of Robert Hamilton of Pressmennan of the lands of Goslingtoun &c.
Not public and general	1681 c. 143 —	17 September 1681
Ratification in favors of John Johnstoun of Elschiesheills of the lands of Esbie and Elschiesheills.
Not public and general	1681 c. 144 —	17 September 1681
Ratification in favors of James Carnegie of Balnamoon of parts of the Common mure of Brechin.
Not public and general	1681 c. 145 —	17 September 1681
Ratification in favors Sr Patrick Houstoun of that Ilk of the barony of Houstoun.
Not public and general	1681 c. 146 —	17 September 1681
Ratification in favors of William Hamilton of Orbistoun of the Lordship and Barony of Erskine &c.
Not public and general	1681 c. 147 —	17 September 1681
Ratification in favors of Sir Patrick Ogilvie of Boyn of the Lands Barony and Thaindome of Boyn.
Not public and general	1681 c. 148 —	17 September 1681
Ratification of ane Act of the Town Council of the Burgh of Dumbartan in favors of the trades thereof.
Not public and general	1681 c. 149 —	17 September 1681
Ratification in favours of Robert Milne of Barntoun of the Lands and Barony of Over Barntoun.
Not public and general	1681 c. 150 —	17 September 1681
Ratification in favours of William Gordoun Shireff Clerk of Aberdeen of the Lands of Newtyle &c.
Not public and general	1681 c. 151 —	17 September 1681
Ratification in favors of Laurence Oliphant Writer to the Signet of the office of Clerk to the admission of Nottars.
Not public and general	1681 c. 152 —	17 September 1681
Ratification in favors of the Incorporation of freemen Fleshers of Edinburgh of their privileges.
Not public and general	1681 c. 153 —	17 September 1681
Ratification in favors of Ninian Bannatine of Kaims of the Barony of Kaims.
Not public and general	1681 c. 154 —	17 September 1681
Ratification of the Submission and Decreet arbitrall betuixt the Burgh of Selkirk and Robert Earle of Roxburgh and others anent the division of the Commonty of Selkirk.
Not public and general	1681 c. 155 —	17 September 1681
Ratification in favors of John Hamilton of Cowbardie of the Lands and Baronie of Cowbardie.
Not public and general	1681 c. 156 —	17 September 1681
Ratification in favours of John Lord Elphinstoun of the Lands Lordship and Barony of Elphinstoun.
Not public and general	1681 c. 157 —	17 September 1681
Ratification of ane Act of Convention of Burrowes empowering the Magistrats and Counsell of the Burgh of Glasgow to sett out in few their Common Muir, &c.
Not public and general	1681 c. 158 —	17 September 1681
Ratification in favors of Sir William Purves of that Ilk Knight Baronet of the Barony of Purves &c.
Not public and general	1681 c. 159 —	17 September 1681
Ratification of severall Acts and Decreets of his Majesties Privy Councill, anent the New buildings, at the entrie to the Parliament-House.
Not public and general	1681 c. 160 —	17 September 1681
Ratification in favors of Sir Charles Halket of Pitfirren Knight and Baronet of the Barony of Pitfirren.
Not public and general	1681 c. 161 —	17 September 1681
Ratification in favors of Robert Lord Nairn of the barony of Nairn.
Not public and general	1681 c. 162 —	17 September 1681
Warrand to George Marques of Huntley for two yeerlie faires and a weekly mercat at Fochabirs.
Not public and general	1681 c. 163 —	17 September 1681
Warrand to Sir George Gordon of Haddo for two yeerlie faires and a weeklie mercat at the Kirktoun of Methlick &c.
Not public and general	1681 c. 164 —	17 September 1681
Warrand to James and David Bethouns of Balfour for a weeklie mercat and two yeirlie faires at Kennoway.
Not public and general	1681 c. 165 —	17 September 1681
Warrand to William Buchannan of Drumakill for changing the fairs and mercat at Drymen.
Not public and general	1681 c. 166 —	17 September 1681
Warrand to James Gordon younger of Lessmore for holding a weeklie mercat and two yeirlie fairs at the Park of Sliach.
Not public and general	1681 c. 167 —	17 September 1681
Warrand to Sir George Gordon of Edinglassie for a yearlie fair and weekly mercat at the Kirk of Glass.
Not public and general	1681 c. 168 —	17 September 1681
Warrand to Alexander Burnet of Craigmyles for two yearlie faires and a weekly mercat at the Kirktoun of Skeen.
Not public and general	1681 c. 169 —	17 September 1681
Warrand to Sir William Graham of Gartmore for four yearlie faires and a weeklie mercat at the Midlethrid of Gartmore.
Not public and general	1681 c. 170 —	17 September 1681
Warrand to Mr John Abercrombie of Glassach for two yearlie faires upon the muir of Glassach.
Not public and general	1681 c. 171 —	17 September 1681
Warrand to Thomas Kirkpatrick of Closeburne for two yeirlie faires and a weekly mercat at the towne of Closeburne.
Not public and general	1681 c. 172 —	17 September 1681
Warrand to David Fothringhame of Ballegerno for two yeirlie faires at the village of Ballegarno.
Not public and general	1681 c. 173 —	17 September 1681
Warrand to John Lord Belhaven for holding two yeirlie faires and a weekly mercat at Stentoun.
Not public and general	1681 c. 174 —	17 September 1681
Warrand to Sir James Dalrymple of Stair for changeing two faires at the kirk of Glenluce.
Not public and general	1681 c. 175 —	17 September 1681
Warrand to Sir Patrick Ogilvie of Boyne for two yeirlies faires on the muirs of Whitehills and Culfin and a weekly mercat at Portsoy.
Not public and general	1681 c. 176 —	17 September 1681
Warrand to John Earle of Tweeddale for two yearlie faires and a weekly mercat at the town of Giffart.
Not public and general	1681 c. 177 —	17 September 1681
Warrand to Sir James Campbell of Lawers for two yearlie fairs at Easter Aberlednock.
Not public and general	1681 c. 178 —	17 September 1681
Warrand to the Burgh of Montrose for a yearlie fair and a weekly mercat.
Not public and general	1681 c. 179 —	17 September 1681
Warrand to M^{r} Robert Harvy of Mameula for two yearlie faires at Mameula near the kirk of Monicabeck.
Not public and general	1681 c. 180 —	17 September 1681
Warrand to the Earle of Airly for two faires at Alyth and two fairs at Cortachie yearlie with a weekly mercat at the kirktoun of Cortachie.
Not public and general	1681 c. 181 —	17 September 1681
Warrand to Anna Countes of Traquair for two yearly faires and a weekly mercat at Inverleithen.
Not public and general	1681 c. 182 —	17 September 1681
Warrand to Charles Lord Creichtoun for three yeirlie faires and a weekly mercat at the town of Cumnock.
Not public and general	1681 c. 183 —	17 September 1681
Warrand to William Blair of that Ilk for a weekly mercat at the village of Dalry.
Not public and general	1681 c. 184 —	17 September 1681
Warrand to William Earle of Queensberrie for two yearlie faires at Dornoch.
Not public and general	1681 c. 185 —	17 September 1681
Warrand to Mr Robert Baillie of Jerviswood for two yearlie faires at Mellarstaines.
Not public and general	1681 c. 186 —	17 September 1681
Warrand to Robert Campbell of Glenlyon for two yearlie faires at Innerwick.
Not public and general	1681 c. 187 —	17 September 1681
Warrand to Andrew Lord Rollo for a yearly fair at the town of Doning.
Not public and general	1681 c. 188 —	17 September 1681
Warrand to Archibald Earl of Argyle for two yearlie faires at Torsiikbeg in Torsa in the Isle of Mull.
Not public and general	1681 c. 189 —	17 September 1681
Warrand to the Marques of Atholl for two faires yearlie at Mullin.
Not public and general	1681 c. 190 —	17 September 1681
Warrand to Sir George Mckenzie of Tarbet for two yearlie faires at the kirk of Fodertie and at Milnetoun.
Not public and general	1681 c. 191 —	17 September 1681
Warrand to Sir George Mckenzie of Rosehaugh for two yearlie faires at the bridge of Avach.
Saving the Rights Act 1681	1681 c. 192; 1681 c. 28	17 September 1681
Act Salvo Jure Cujuslibet. Act Salvo Jure Cujuslibet.
Adjournment Act 1681 (repealed)	1681 c. 193 —	17 September 1681
Act of Adjournment. Act of Adjournment. (Repealed by Statute Law Revision (Scotland) Act 1906 (6 Edw. 7. c. 38))

=== Sources ===
- Alexander, William (1841). "Acta Parliamentorum Regis Caroli Secundi". An Abridgement of the Acts of the Parliaments of Scotland. Edinburgh: Adam and Charles Black. pp. A67–A70 – via Google Books.
- Alexander, William (1841). "Acta Parliamentorum Regis Caroli Secundi". An Abridgement of the Acts of the Parliaments of Scotland. Edinburgh: Adam and Charles Black. pp. A67–A70 – via Google Books.
- Chronological Table of the Statutes. London: Her Majesty's Stationery Office. 1972. pp. 1350–1357 – via Google Books.
- "Acts of the Old Scottish Parliament: 1681". legislation.gov.uk. The National Archives.
- "Index of Statutes: Index of Statutes: Charles II (1649-1685)". Records of the Parliaments of Scotland to 1707. University of St Andrews.

== See also ==
- List of legislation in the United Kingdom
- Records of the Parliaments of Scotland
