= Lawburrows =

Type of protective order (Scots law)

Lawburrows is a little-known civil action in Scots law initiated by one person afraid of another's possible violence. The term is derived from law-borrow, where borrow is used in the archaic sense of a pledge, guarantee, or surety (souerte in the act below). Hence, it is a "legal security" that a person "will not injure the person, family, or property of another".

== Lawburrows Act 1429 ==
Lawburrows Act 1429
- Act of Parliament
- Parliament of Scotland
- Long title: Of soverte askit be ony of the kingis liegis that hes doute of his life.
- Citation: 1429 c. 20 (12mo ed: c. 129)

Dates
- Royal assent: 6 March 1430

Other legislation
- Amended by: Statute Law Revision (Scotland) Act 1906; Statute Law Revision (Scotland) Act 1964

Status: Amended

Text of the Lawburrows Act 1429 as in force today (including any amendments) within the United Kingdom, from legislation.gov.uk.

The Lawburrows Act 1429 (c. 20) remains in force and says:

It is statute ande ordanit that gif ony of the kingis liegis haf ony doute of his life outhir be dede or manance or violent presumpcioun ande he ask souerte of thaim that he doutis the schiref sal tak souerte of the party that the complante is maid apoun sa that the party playntife mak prufe of the dede or of manance or of the violent presumpcioun maid or done till hym

== Threats of violence and Scots civil law ==
Normally, where there is a fear of violence from certain known people, the normal recourse is through Scots criminal law and police. However, because of the need to involve the police and the Procurator Fiscal Service to seek remedies in criminal law; this recourse may be lengthy with no direct control by the complainer (in other jurisdictions, the complainant). There is also a need in criminal proceedings to provide witnesses and evidence to satisfy the corroboration requirement and to establish the guilt of the accused beyond reasonable doubt in order to secure a criminal conviction. As such, remedies available in criminal law may be limited if the threats of violence struggle to meet the criminal law's burden of proof.

Civil law primarily deals the enforcement of private rights and obligations between individuals and/or property. Lawburrows, as a civil law remedy, enables people to "take the law into their own hands" by exercising their rights under civil law. The burden of proof in civil cases is much less onerous than that of criminal law, only requiring that there is a likelihood of violence on the balance of probabilities and accordingly so too is the standard required of the evidence.

=== Interdicts ===
The most common action against someone who threatens violence is interdict, in other jurisdictions, an injunction, but this is awarded at the discretion of judge or sheriff. Since public interest (the general effects of the action on the welfare of society) is involved, corroborative witnesses may be required. Interdict may require the defender to refrain from a specific conduct. Although provisional, or interim, interdicts can be granted speedily, obtaining a perpetual interdict may be very time-consuming and costly. A great disadvantage of interdict is the uncertainty about what happens should the defender disobey the interdict. If it is a first offence, a mild or nominal punishment, such as contempt of court, may be imposed or a warning given.

=== Lawburrows ===
In Scotland an alternative to interdicts is lawburrows. Lawburrows in a civil action allows a pursuer, in other jurisdictions termed a plaintiff, to require the defender to make a deposit of money as a guarantee they will not harm the pursuer. If the pursuer is later harmed by the defender, the deposit is forfeit and is split between the court and the pursuer. This was first passed by a Parliament of James I in 1429 as a remedy against threats to the safety of members of the public. The aim of Lawburrows was stated in the act "...to prevent such delinquences (the issuing of threats) and terrify evil doers..." The process is remarkable for its simplicity, speed of execution, low cost of process and the absolute certainty of the exact penalty should the order be contravened. Neither the police nor the procurator fiscal is involved unless there is a contravention of lawburrows.

Very roughly: If Alice is put in fear by Bob, Alice asks a Sheriff to hear the case against Bob (this is a civil action and so standard of proof is low). If proven, the Sheriff shall require a deposit from Bob. If, later, Alice shows the Sheriff that Bob has continued to put Alice in fear, the deposit is forfeited and divided equally between Alice and the Court. This does not preclude a criminal action being taken against Bob.

== The process of lawburrows ==
In an initial writ to the sheriff court, the pursuer asserts that he fears harm to either his person, property, family, tenant or employees from the defender. He asks the sheriff to obtain a certain sum of money (a "caution") or a bond as security against being molested or troubled further by the defender.

As soon as this writ is received, the sheriff clerk must immediately order it to be served on the defender and a date for an early hearing has to be fixed at the same time. At the court hearing, the standard of proof is on the balance of probabilities, so the pursuer need only show that on the balance of probabilities it is likely that harm may occur. This is a summary procedure—with no civil jury present and the Sheriff alone deciding on the facts of the case.

If the pursuer is successful, the sheriff can order a sum of money to be found (or a bond to be given) and he can order that, should the defender fail to provide this, he shall be imprisoned for up to six months. If the defender does any harm of the kind specified in the initial writ, the pursuer may (with the consent of the Procurator Fiscal) raise an action for "contravention of lawburrows" asking that the money, or bond, be forfeited and divided equally between the Crown and himself.

The action for contravention of lawburrows does not preclude any other remedies, such as a civil action for damages for assault, or criminal proceedings by the Procurator Fiscal.

=== Characteristics ===
- One action can encompass not only the person of the pursuer, but also his family, property and employees.
- Only the pursuer has to offer evidence to show that his fear of harm is rational and well-founded.
- Proof is at the level of balance of probability.
- If judgment cannot be given immediately, then it has to be delivered by a date specified at the time of the hearing.
- The nature of the threat does not have to be specified in detail, only that vindictive persecution is feared.
- The penalty is lodged in advance of any contravention, and its amount does not depend on the circumstances in which any contravention took place.
- The specific sum to be lodged as security is not predetermined. The pursuer may suggest an amount, but the sheriff has discretion to determine it. The amount is intended to deter contravention of the order.
- The process is straightforward at every stage, there is no room for defences, preliminary pleas, debates, and continuations.
- The process is speedy, the date of proof is fixed at the outset.
- The rules of summary criminal procedure apply so there are no written pleadings.
- The objective of the action is clear and simple. It is to keep the pursuer harmless from illegal violence of which he alleges he is in dread at the time of the application.

== Application ==
The remedy of lawburrows has a very long history. Its application is very narrow, referring only to people being put in fear and there are many alternative remedies in the criminal law, involving the police to whom people put in fear are most likely to appeal in the first instance. Many attempts to obtain remedies in this way are thwarted by the reluctance of the police to get involved in domestic disputes and quarrels between neighbours, often because of the difficulty of obtaining the witnesses needed in criminal proceedings. Such a need is largely circumvented in actions of lawburrows. Although little known to the public, and even to some solicitors, lawburrows is still in use in the present time.

Several cases in the 1980s failed because lawburrows was misapplied and, consequently, in 1988, the case for the repeal or the overhaul of lawburrows was argued cogently by W J Stewart.

Civil Judicial Statistics Scotland records 25 instances in the four-year period 1999–2002, 17 of which were in 2001. A freedom of information request in 2017 showed there were no civil actions of this type in the preceding three years.

The simplicity of lawburrows actions has attracted some vexatious litigation. In one case in 2012, a lawburrows action was sought against an accountant by a pursuer who was themselves the subject of a sequestration (bankruptcy) action, apparently to delay the latter.

== See also ==
- Injunction
- court order
- Anti-social behaviour order
- List of acts of the Parliament of Scotland
