= Registers of Scotland =

Scottish Government department

- Scottish Gaelic: Clàran na h-Alba

Non-ministerial government department overview
- Formed: 1617
- Jurisdiction: Scotland
- Headquarters: Meadowbank House, 153 London Road, Edinburgh EH8 7AU
- Employees: ~ 1,300
- Minister responsible: Ben Macpherson, Cabinet Secretary for Finance
- Non-ministerial government department executive: Jennifer Henderson, Keeper of the Registers of Scotland
- Website: www.ros.gov.uk

Registers of Scotland (RoS) (Scottish Gaelic: Clàran na h-Alba) is the non-ministerial department of the Scottish Government responsible for compiling and maintaining records relating to property and other legal documents. They currently maintain 23 public registers. The official responsible with maintaining the Registers of Scotland is the Keeper of the Registers of Scotland (known simply as the Keeper). Ex officio, the Keeper of the Registers of Scotland is also the Deputy Keeper of the Great Seal of Scotland. The Keeper of the Registers of Scotland should not be confused with the Keeper of the Records of Scotland.

== History of public records and registration ==
The first official tasked with the care and administration of the public registers was first recorded in the role of Clericus Rotulorum (Clerk of the Rolls) in the Kingdom of Scotland in 1286. Registers, rolls and records were kept in Edinburgh Castle from about the 13th century. The role of the Clerk of the Rolls eventually became known as the Lord Clerk Register, the oldest surviving great offices of state in Scotland. However, records held by the Scottish Crown did not typically include personal data such as birth, death and marriage records. Instead, the clergy and other officials of the Church of Scotland kept parish records, which recorded personal data such as baptisms and marriages, but only for their own church members so parish records were limited in scope. In 1551, a council of Scottish clergy enacted that all parish ministers should keep a record of baptisms, burials and marriages.

In 1806, a royal warrant established the office of Deputy Clerk Register, effectively reducing the record keeping duties of the Lord Clerk Register to an honorary title with no day-to-day management of the Registers and Records of Scotland. In 1854, the Deputy Clerk Register's duties were also extended to the care of the records of births, deaths and marriages in the role of Registrar General under the Registration of Births, Deaths and Marriages (Scotland) Act 1854, which established the General Register Office of Births, Deaths and Marriages.

The Lord Clerk Register (Scotland) Act 1879 (42 & 43 Vict. c. 44) further provided that the office of Lord Clerk Register would remain as a ceremonial Great Officer of State, with all record keeping duties passing to the Deputy Clerk Register. In 1909 by Sir James Patten McDougall was appointed as Deputy Clerk Register, the last holder of the combined offices of Registrar General and Deputy Lord Clerk Register. The Registrar General (Scotland) Act 1920 provided for the appointment by the Secretary of State for Scotland of a full-time Registrar General, separate from the Deputy Clerk Register. The recording of personal data was in effect severed from the Deputy Clerk Register, who continued to maintain the records and registers of Scotland. Dr James Crawford Dunlop, who had served as medical superintendent of statistics since 1904, first held the office of Registrar General from 1921 to 1930. The 12 subsequent registrars-general were drawn from the civil service in Scotland and headed the General Register Office for Scotland independently from the Deputy Clerk Register.

In 1928, the office of Deputy Clerk Register itself was abolished by the Reorganisation of Offices (Scotland) Act 1928, becoming the Keeper of the Registers and Records of Scotland. However, it came to be recognised that the keeping of records and the keeping of registers was too cumbersome a task to be entrusted to a single department. In 1948, the Public Registers and Records (Scotland) Act 1948 provided that the Registers of Scotland and Records of Scotland were to be split into two separate government organisations with two separate officials:

1. the Keeper of the Registers of Scotland and
2. the Keeper of the Records of Scotland.

The Keeper of the Registers of Scotland was given the duties to maintain and preserve the General Register of Sasines, the Register of Hornings, the Register of Inhibitions and Adjudications, the Register of Deeds and other chancery and judicial registers. The Keeper of the Records of Scotland, was given the duties by the Public Registers and Records (Scotland) Act 1948 to preserve the public registers, records and rolls of Scotland.

From 1949, the Keeper of the Registers headed the Department of the Registers of Scotland. The Keeper of the Records of Scotland headed the Records Office, later called the National Archives of Scotland. This left three departments and their respective officials managed the following:

- Personal Data: The Registrar General and the General Register Office for Scotland.
- Records: The Keeper of the Records of Scotland and the Records Office, later the National Archives of Scotland.
- Registers: The Keeper of the Registers of Scotland and Registers of Scotland.

=== Recent mergers ===
The National Records of Scotland (NRS) was created on 1 April 2011 by the merger of the General Register Office for Scotland and National Archives of Scotland and is a non-ministerial government department of the Scottish Government. NRS is part of the National Collections of Scotland and falls with the ministerial portfolio of the Cabinet Secretary for Culture, Europe and External Affairs. The Registers of Scotland remain a separate organisation and fall within the ministerial portfolio of the Cabinet Secretary for Finance.

=== Location of the public registers ===
After storage in Edinburgh Castle, the registers and records were later moved to the old Parliament House at the end of the 17th century. The Laigh (Old) Parliament House became the home of the national records and registers from 1662 to 1692, was regarded as unsatisfactory and inadequate. In its place, Robert Adam was commissioned to design the building now known as Register House in Princes Street. Over time, Registers of Scotland outgrew Register House and moved to the Meadowbank House site in 1976 and as of 2013 also operates additional offices in Glasgow.

== Structure ==
Registers of Scotland is the non-Ministerial government department statutorily responsible for registering a variety of legal documents in Scotland. It is part of the Scottish Government and is associated with the Finance and Sustainable Growth portfolio.

Registers of Scotland is headed by the Keeper of the Registers of Scotland (the Keeper), who is a non-ministerial office holder in the Scottish administration and who also acts as chief executive of Registers of Scotland. The keeper is appointed by the First Minister with the consent of the Lord President of the Court of Session. The keeper is accountable to the Lands Tribunal for Scotland and higher Scottish civil courts in respect of the exercise of their statutory functions. The keeper is accountable to the Scottish Ministers for achieving financial objectives as determined by them.

The keeper's main duty is responsibility for the running of Registers of Scotland and for the statutory functions placed upon her in relation to the management, control and maintenance of the following public registers of legal documents and deeds relating to property.

With a staff of over 1,200 people located in offices in Edinburgh and Glasgow, the keeper is assisted by the operations director and accountable officer. The keeper chairs the management board of Registers of Scotland which is the main decision making body. The board meets quarterly to confirm the strategic direction. The members of the board of Registers of Scotland are as follows:

- Jennifer Henderson, Keeper of the Registers of Scotland
- Chris Kerr, Director of Policy and Corporate Services and Accountable Officer
- Tracy Mcintyre, Director of People and Operational Services
- Martin Burns, Director of Digital, Data and Technology
- David Blair, Director for Customer and Business Development
- Dónall Curtin, Non-Executive Director and Audit and Risk Committee Chair
- Neil Mackay, Non-Executive director
- Mhairi Kennedy, Non-Executive director
- Asim Muhammad, Non-Executive director
- Elaine Melrose, Non-Executive director

== The public registers ==
The Keeper of the Registers of Scotland, known simply as the Keeper, is the Scottish Government civil servant tasked with the management of the public registers of Scotland. Today, there are now twenty one public registers under the Keeper's care. These are:

=== The Land Register of Scotland ===
This is an Ordnance Survey map-based register introduced under the Land Registration (Scotland) Act 1979, now largely governed by the Land Registration etc. (Scotland) Act 2012 as the replacement to the Sasine Register. As a Torrens-based registration system, it is a register of ownership (termed title) rather than a register of deeds concerning land, like the General Register of Sasines. The Land Register of Scotland is held in Edinburgh at the Registers of Scotland's offices at Meadowbank House alongside the other public registers, rather than decentralised and stored in local government registers in Scotland. It is available for public viewing online at ScotLIS – Scotland's Land Information Service and title sheets for land can be obtained via e-mail upon payment of a modest fee. In 2016, a Registers of Scotland report found that 60% of titles are on the Land Register, which is 1.6 million titles or 29% of the land mass of Scotland. Therefore 40% of titles remain to be transferred from the General Register of Sasines which equates to 1.1 million titles. The Keeper projects to be 100% by 2024 due to the closure of the Sasine Register, in a process known as the Completion of the Land Register. However, academics are sceptical that a complete closure of the General Register of Sasines can be achieved by 2024, with Gretton and Reid noting that Completion could take "centuries".

=== The General Register of Sasines ===
==== Early history ====
After the introduction of the feudal system of land tenure in Scotland under the Davidian Revolution, formal ceremonies were conducted on the land itself by a sasine ceremony, where an owner gives sasine to another (from the Old French seiser, "to seize"). The Registration Act 1617 (c. 16 (S)), stipulated that the instrument of sasine required registration in order to create or transfer real rights in Scots law:

"HIS Maiestie with aduyis and consent of the estaittis of Parliament statutes and ordanis That thair salbe ane publick Register In the whiche all Reuersiounes regresses bandis and writtis for making of reuersiounes or regresses assignatiounes thairto dischargis of the same renunciatiounes of wodsettis and grantis off redemptioun and siclyik all instrumentis of seasing salbe registrat ..."

The result of 1617 act was the creation of the Register of Sasines which was one of the most advanced systems of land registration at the time in Europe. The Register of Sasines operated by the registration of deeds transferring land, such as feudal grants and dispositions, being registered publicly in order to give rise to a real right of ownership under the 1617 act. Few other European countries introduced any form of registration until the 19th century and in England and Wales some areas had no system of public registration until 1990.

==== 19th–20th century ====
During the 19th century, important reforms were made to the Sasine conveyancing process itself. The Infeftment Act 1845 (8 & 9 Vict. c. 35) removed the requirement of carrying out the sasine ceremony. The Titles to Land Consolidation (Scotland) Act 1868 (31 & 32 Vict. c. 101) also provided that the instrument of sasine (the deed recording the ceremony) was no longer necessary with the conveyance [contained in a formal deed, the disposition] itself being registrable.

The passage of the Land Registers (Scotland) Act 1868 further reformed the General Register of Sasines, introducing a sorting system for deeds by the counties in Scotland. Search sheets, listing the deeds in registered in a property, were also introduced to simplify the registration and search process. However, by this stage, due to the developments in cartography, many legal systems such as Australia and Germany began to use title registration, or Torrens System, based on cadastre maps of the land outlining the plots of ownership. The General Register of Sasines, in contrast, relied on deeds alone and the extent of the land transferred was narrated into the deed. This made it difficult to identify what exactly had been transferred in practice, especially with examination of historic deeds using historic measurement units. The General Register of Sasines began to appear outdated and even by 1900 the debate commenced about its replacement. The final legislation to introduce a new map-based system was the Land Registration (Scotland) Act 1979 (c. 33) which introduced a map-based Land Register of Scotland.

==== Closure of the Sasine Register ====
The Land Registration (Scotland) Act 1979 provided that each county's General Register of Sasines would transfer over to the new Land Register. The 'live' date for each county was:

1. Renfrew - 6 April 1981
2. Dumbarton - 4 October 1982
3. Lanark - 3 January 1984
4. The Barony and Regality of Glasgow - 30 September 1985
5. Clackmannan - 1 October 1992
6. Stirling - 1 April 1993
7. West Lothian - 1 October 1993
8. Fife - 1 April 1995
9. Aberdeen - 1 April 1996
10. Kincardine - 1 April 1996
11. Ayr - 1 April 1997
12. Dumfries - 1 April 1997
13. Kirkcudbright - 1 April 1997
14. Wigtown - 1 April 1997
15. Angus - 1 April 1999
16. Kinross - 1 April 1999
17. Perth - 1 April 1999
18. Berwick - 1 October 1999
19. East Lothian - 1 October 1999
20. Peebles - 1 October 1999
21. Roxburgh - 1 October 1999
22. Selkirk - 1 October 1999
23. Argyll - 1 April 2000
24. Bute - 1 April 2000
25. Midlothian - 1 April 2001
26. Inverness - 1 April 2002
27. Nairn - 1 April 2002
28. Banff - 1 April 2003
29. Caithness - 1 April 2003
30. Moray - 1 April 2003
31. Orkney & Zetland - 1 April 2003
32. Ross & Cromarty - 1 April 2003
33. Sutherland - 1 April 2003
34. The Seabed of Scotland - 8 December 2014 (this was only introduced following the passage of the Land Registration etc. (Scotland) Act 2012).

Following the 'live' date for each county, it was no longer competent to record deeds concerning a property in that county in the General Register of Sasines. Instead a new voluntary application had to be made to the Land Register of Scotland. Over time the Land Register began to be filled as property changed hands, necessitating a new application in the Land Register. Under the Abolition of Feudal Tenure (Scotland) Act 2000, the abolition of feudalism also took place on 28 November 2004, ending the historic feudal nature of the Register of Sasines.

However, large swathes of land in Scotland still remained registered in the General Register of Sasines, and this coupled with the working problems of the Land Registration (Scotland) Act 1979 led to the Scottish Law Commission's Report on Land Registration (2010, SLC Report 222). The result of this report was the recommendation of the whole-scale reform of the Land Register. The recommendations of the report were accepted by the Scottish Government and the Land Registration etc. (Scotland) Act 2012 was passed by the Scottish Parliament. The GRS is now projected to close by 2024, with all recorded land moved to the Land Register.

Unregistered land still found in the Register of Sasines includes land such as large estates that have remained in the same family for generations, land owned by local authorities historically owned by other local government bodies such as burghs or town councils (this is commonly the case with parks managed by local authorities) and land owned by the Forestry and Land Scotland and other public bodies etc. The 2012 act has gone further to initiate this transfer, such as the introduction of keeper-induced registration. However it remains to be seen whether the Sasine Register will be closed by 2024.

=== Registers of Moveable Transactions ===
The Moveable Transactions (Scotland) Act 2023 has modernised the law in Scotland in relation to transferring claims and taking security over moveable property through the creation of two new RoS registers.

The Register of Assignations (RoA) and the Register of Statutory Pledges (RSP) were launched on 1 April 2025.

RoA allows claims to payment to legally transfer in Scotland through registration of an assignation in that register.

RSP allows a fixed security over physical moveable property, intellectual property, or financial instruments to be created without first giving up ownership or possession by registering a statutory pledge in that register.

Ensure you read our guidance before registering or searching.

You can:

read our online guidance search the registers make a submission

Access the RoA

Access the RSP

=== Register of Statutory Pledges ===
The Register of Statutory Pledges (RSP) allows the legal creation of statutory pledges in Scotland under the Moveable Transactions (Scotland) Act 2023.

This means that physical moveable property, intellectual property, and financial instruments can be used as security for loans and can be registered as a Statutory Pledge on the RSP.

=== Register of Assignations ===
The Register of Assignations (RoA) allows claims, typically for payment, to legally transfer in Scotland through registration of an assignation in the RoA.

This registration alternative to intimation was introduced by the Moveable Transactions (Scotland) Act 2023.

=== The Register of Community Interests in Land ===
There are two parts to this register (1) the community body interests and (2) Agricultural bodies right to buy. The register came into force on 14 June 2004.

The community body interests part was introduced under the Land Reform (Scotland) Act 2003 Part 2 required that the Keeper should set up and keep a Register of Community Bodies Interests in Land. Community Bodies have a pre-emptive right to buy land in Scotland. The three community right to buy in total are: (1) The pre-emptive right to buy (2) the absolute right to buy land for further sustainable development, and (3) the absolute right to buy Abandoned, Neglected or Detrimental Land.

The agricultural bodies part was established under the Agricultural Holdings (Scotland) Act 2003, this register allows agricultural tenants to register an interest in the tenanted land so that the tenant can buy it if the property is put up for sale.

=== Register of Applications by Community Bodies to Buy Land (RoACBL) ===
This is the newest register, it records all abandoned, neglected or detrimental land acquired by community bodies under the Land Reform Scotland Act 2003 Part 3A (Right to buy abandoned, neglected or detrimental land).

=== The Crofting Register ===
Established under the Crofting Reform (Scotland) Act 2010, this register allows crofters to register an interest in the crofting land. Registration is required in certain circumstances.

=== Register of Sites of Special Scientific Interest ===
Established under the Nature Conservation (Scotland) Act 2004, this register lists all holds information on all SSSIs across Scotland.

An SSSI is an area of land that NatureScot considers to be special for its plants, animals, habitats, its rocks or landforms, or a combination of such natural features. The purpose of SSSIs is to safeguard and represent the diversity and geographic range of the natural features of Scotland, Great Britain and the EU member states.

The Register, as with most open registers, is available to both the public and legal profession and searching of the Register is free of charge. Users can find SSSIs using either a map or by entering search criteria such as a town name or postcode.

=== Register of Persons Holding a Controlled Interest in Land ===
RCI is a RoS register, required by law, that was launched on 1 April 2022. It is free to submit and free to search.

The register shows who controls the decisions of owners or tenants (for more than 20 years) of land and property in Scotland, where this information may not be publicly transparent elsewhere.

=== Scottish Landlord Register ===
Established by the Antisocial Behaviour etc. (Scotland) Act 2004, this register records all registered landlords in Scotland who lease residential property. Operating as an unregistered residential landlord is a criminal offence in Scotland.

=== Scottish Letting Agent Register ===
Established by the Housing (Scotland) Act 2014, this register records all registered letting agents in Scotland who act as letting agents for residential property. Operating as an unregistered residential letting agent is a criminal offence in Scotland.

=== Register of Inhibitions and Adjudications ===
An inhibition is a freeze method of diligence (ie: judicial enforcement of debt) that prohibits a debtor from selling or burdening his or her land and an adjudication is a seize diligence allowing a creditor to sell the debtor's land in payment of a debt. Both types of diligence must be recorded in the Register of Inhibitions and Adjudications. The purpose of this register is to give notice to the public that the persons inhibited are unable to grant a good title.

As a normal method of due diligence, purchasers of heritable property always insists upon a search in this register to ensure that the seller is not legally prevented from selling the property.

NB: If Part 4 of the Bankruptcy and Diligence (Scotland) Act 2007 is brought into force, adjudications will be replaced with a new form of diligence, known as 'land attachment' and the Register of Adjudications will close.

=== Registers of Judgments ===
This register of a register for foreign judgments passed in England, Ireland, Commonwealth, the European Union and other countries, that have been registered and enforced in Scottish courts. This register, along with the registers of deeds and protests originally passed to the care of the Lord Clerk Register, and later the Keeper.

=== Register of Deeds and Probative Writs in the Books of Council and Session ===
Known as the Books of Council and Session, this register, set up in 1554, is used for the registration of an original traditional documents. It also acts as a safe deposit for important documents that parties wish to place in the public domain. Extracts of documents are available to be extracted from the Books of Council and Session upon payment of a fee.

=== Register of Protests ===
Under a bill-of-exchange, a form of negotiable instrument, a protest can be lodged demanding payment of the sum specified in the bill of exchange under the Bills of Exchange Act 1882. This register records all protests of the bills of exchange where the obligations have not been fulfilled. However, with the disuse of bills of exchange in favour of other financial methods, no registration has taken place for over 10 years.

=== Register of Entails ===
Under the Entail Act 1685 (c. 26 (S)), an entail or tailzie (pronounced: 'tailie') ensured that a heritable property could descend to a series of heirs or substitutes specified, even though the heirs may not have been inherited the property under Scots succession law. Entails were abolished under the Abolition of Feudal Tenure etc. (Scotland) Act 2001 and the Keeper of the Registers closed the Register of Entails on 28 November 2004. The register was then transmitted to the Keeper of the Records for preservation.

=== Register of the Great Seal ===
The Acts of Union 1707 directed that the Great Seal of Scotland would be replaced by the Great Seal of the United Kingdom. However, for the authentication of Crown Writs relating to lands or offices in Scotland, it made provision for a new “seal to be kept and used in Scotland in place of the Great seal formerly used there.” The seal is affixed to letters patent, commissions issued to King's Counsel, the Lord Advocate, the Lord High Commissioner of the General Assembly of the Church of Scotland and other royal appointments. The register records these appointments.

=== Register of the Quarter Seal ===
This register records heritable property which fall to the Crown as ultimus haeres (property with no living heir to inherit) or bona vacantia (abandoned land).

=== Register of the Cachet Seal ===
The Register of the Cachet Seal records all notaries public in Scotland. The Cachet Seal is a silver-made facsimile of the Sovereign's signature, which was first established in 1603 following the Union of the Crowns. The Cachet Seal itself is still used in disposing of property from the Crown that has fallen to it by virtue of the Crown's role as recipient of ultimus haeres and bona vacantia property, a role which is managed by the Crown's representative, the Queen's and Lord Treasurer's Remembrancer.

=== Register of Prince's Seal ===
The heir apparent to the Crown in Scotland was known as the Prince and Great Steward of Scotland, similar to the title of dauphin in Ancien France. The current Prince and Great Steward of Scotland is the Duke of Rothesay, Prince William. This register records any lands granted by the Prince and Great Steward of Scotland. However no new entry has been made in this register since 1887.

=== Register of Crown Grants ===
This register contains deeds such as conveyances, leases, agreements or renunciations relating to Crown property in Scotland which were granted by or to certain government departments. The Crown owned certain rights to property in the inter regalia, which can be granted to individual as a separate legal tenement. The register was closed by the Land Tenure Reform (Scotland) Act 1974.

=== Register of Sheriff's Commissions ===
This register records all commissions issued to individuals to become sheriffs in Scotland. This register was brought into force by the Heritable Jurisdictions (Scotland) Act 1746 (20 Geo. 2. c. 43).

=== Register of Service of Heirs ===
Service of heirs is legal process in which an heir to an estate proves he is the heir of an intestate estate or of a legacy left to an ancestor in a will. Established by the Service of Heirs Act 1847, this register records all individuals who have used the process successfully to become entitled to an estate. Although service of heirs was abolished by the Succession (Scotland) Act 1964, service of heirs is still competent in relation to an ancestor who died before 10 September 1965.

=== Register of Hornings ===
This register was used to record letters of horning obtained from the Scottish courts denouncing the debtor as an outlaw. Originally in Scotland, imprisonment for debt was enforceable only in certain cases, but a custom gradually grew up of taking the debtor's oath to pay. If the debtor broke his oath, he became liable to the discipline of the Church. The civil power could step in to aid the ecclesiastical, denouncing the debtor as an outlaw, imprisoning his person and confiscating his goods. The method of declaring a person a rebel was by giving three blasts on a horn and publicly proclaiming the fact; hence the expression "put to the horn".

The subsequent process, a warrant directing a messenger-at-arms to charge the debtor to pay or perform in terms of the letters, was called letters of horning. This system of execution was simplified by the Debtors (Scotland) Act 1838, and execution was thereafter usually by diligence (see writ of execution).

The granting of letters of horning, letters of horning and poinding, letters of poinding, and letters of caption all ceased to be competent following the Debtors (Scotland) Act 1987. The Register is therefore closed.
