= Officer of the court =

Term for legal professionals in common law jurisdictions

Officer of the court is a term of art which has multiple meanings. In common law jurisdictions it is often defined as any person who has an obligation to promote justice and uphold the law. As such, officers of the court usually have legal and ethical obligations. They are tasked to participate to the best of their ability in the functioning of the judicial system to forge justice out of the application of the law and the simultaneous pursuit of the legitimate interests of all parties and the general good of society.

The term is also used to describe specific officials and individuals who some degree in the function of their professional or similar qualifications have a part in the legal system, or alternatively is used to describe a specific set of individuals involved with the legal system. Officers of the court may include entities such as judges, lawyers, clerks, and other court personnel. It is sometimes used synonymously with court officer, although this may also refer to a police officer or a similar official, who may or may not be an officer of the court.

In French-speaking jurisdictions, officers of the court, excluding judges, are known as auxiliaires de justice (literally, auxiliaries of justice), not to be confused with judicial assistants.

== Examples ==
The following individuals are usually considered officers of the court:

- Judges, including magistrates and coroners
- Lawyers are usually considered officers of the court. In the United States the Supreme Court held in Ex parte Garland that "Attorneys and counselors are not officers of the United States; they are officers of the court, admitted as such by its order upon evidence of their possessing sufficient legal learning and fair private character." In England and Wales, however, barristers are not officers of the court, whereas solicitors are. In other jurisdictions, such as Ontario, Canada, advocates like paralegals are recognised as officers of the court.
- Court clerks and other personnel employed by the court
- Individuals appointed by the court to perform certain legal functions, such as liquidators (in England and Wales, in compulsory liquidations), trustees in bankruptcy, executors and administrators
- Medical examiners, and other medical and psychiatric professionals
- Police officers, including sheriffs, constables, and other enforcement personnel such as bailiffs, sheriff officers, messengers-at-arms and tipsaves (who may also be administrative officials)
- Interpreters/translators are generally considered officers of the court. They render their services to the parties in the interests of the court proceedings. Some interpreters may be employed on a permanent basis by courts to act as interpreters when called upon, e.g. International Court of Justice and the European Court of Justice. In some jurisdictions, interpreters may also be deemed as officers of the court pro tempore. Court interpreters and translators have an absolute ethical duty to tell judges the truth and avoid evasion.
- Process servers are, in some jurisdictions, appointed by a court and are considered appointed officers of the court.

== Sources and references ==
- Law.com
- Publications bibliography
