= Alimony =

Legal obligation to provide financial support to one's spouse due to marital separation

Alimony, also called aliment (Scotland), maintenance (England, Republic of Ireland, Northern Ireland, Wales, Canada, New Zealand), spousal support (U.S., Canada) and spousal maintenance (Australia), is a legal obligation on a person to provide financial support to their spouse before or after marital separation or divorce. The obligation varies depending on the divorce law or family law of each country and prenuptial agreements. In most jurisdictions, it is distinct from child support, where, after divorce, one parent is required to contribute to the support of their children by paying money to the child's other parent or guardian.

== Etymology ==
The term alimony comes from the Latin word alimonia 'nourishment, sustenance', from alere 'to nourish'. Also derived from this word are the terms alimentary (of, or relating to food, nutrition, or digestion), and aliment (a Scots Law rule regarding sustenance to assure the wife's lodging, food, clothing, and other necessities after divorce).

== History ==
The Code of Hammurabi (1754 BC) declares that a man must provide sustenance to a woman who has borne him children so that she can raise them:

137. If a man wish to separate from a woman who has borne him children, or from his wife who has borne him children: then he shall give that wife her dowry, and a part of the usufruct of field, garden, and property, so that she can rear her children. When she has brought up her children, a portion of all that is given to the children, equal as that of one son, shall be given to her. She may then marry the man of her heart.

The above law only applies to women who had children with her husband. This fits more closely with the definition of child support in some jurisdictions.

Alimony is also discussed in the Code of Justinian.

The modern concept of alimony is derived from English ecclesiastical courts that awarded alimony in cases of separation and divorce. Alimony pendente lite was given until the divorce decree, based on the husband's duty to support the wife during a marriage that still continued. Post-divorce or permanent alimony was also based on the notion that the marriage continued, as ecclesiastical courts could only award a divorce a mensa et thoro, similar to a legal separation today. As divorce did not end the marriage, the husband's duty to support his wife remained intact.

== Fault-based alimony ==
Liberalization of divorce laws occurred in the 19th century, but divorce was only possible in cases of marital misconduct. As a result, the requirement to pay alimony became linked to the concept of fault in the divorce. Alimony to wives was paid because it was assumed that the marriage, and the wife's right to support, would have continued but for the misbehavior of the husband. Ending alimony on divorce would have permitted a guilty husband to profit from his own misconduct. In contrast, if the wife committed the misconduct, she was considered to have forfeited any claim to ongoing support. However, during this period, parties could rarely afford alimony, and so it was rarely awarded by courts. As husbands' incomes increased, and with it the possibility of paying alimony, the awarding of alimony increased, generally because a wife could show a need for ongoing financial support, and the husband had the ability to pay.

== No-fault alimony ==
No-fault divorce led to changes in alimony. Whereas spousal support was considered a right under the fault-based system, it became conditional under the no-fault approach. According to the American Bar Association, marital fault is a "factor" in awarding alimony in 25 states and the District of Columbia. The no-fault alimony has been criticized in some cases where a domestic violence survivor was required to pay alimony to their abuser.

== Permanent or rehabilitative alimony ==
Permanent alimony has begun to fall out of favor because it encourages the alimony recipient to not find employment or remarry so that they will continue to receive money from their ex-spouse. However, many states still have permanent alimony awards.

Some countries are replacing alimony that maintain a spouse's standard of living with rehabilitative alimony.

== Gender bias ==
In the 1970s, the United States Supreme Court ruled against gender bias in alimony awards. According to the U.S. Census Bureau, the percentage of alimony recipients who are male rose from 2.4% in 2001 to 3.6% in 2006. In states like Massachusetts and Louisiana, the salaries of new spouses may be used in determining the alimony paid to the previous partners. Most recently, in several high-profile divorces, women such as Britney Spears, Victoria Principal, and Jessica Simpson have paid multimillion-dollar settlements in lieu of alimony to ex-husbands. According to divorce lawyers, aggressive pursuit of spousal support by men is becoming more common, as the stigma associated with asking for alimony fades.

== Procedure ==
Procedure varies by country. Once dissolution proceedings commence, either party may seek interim or pendente lite support during the course of the litigation. Where a divorce or dissolution of marriage (civil union) is granted, either party may ask for post-marital alimony. It is not an absolute right, but may be granted, the amount and terms varying with the circumstances. If one party is already receiving support at the time of the divorce, the previous order is not automatically continued (although this can be requested), as the arguments for support during and after the marriage can be different.

Unless the parties agree on the terms of their divorce in a binding written instrument, the court will make a determination based on the legal argument and the testimony submitted by both parties. This can be modified at any future date based on a change of circumstances by either party on proper notice to the other party and application to the court. The courts are generally reluctant to modify an existing agreement unless the reasons are compelling. In some jurisdictions the court always has jurisdiction to grant maintenance should one of the former spouses become a public charge.

== By country ==
=== Canada ===
Types of spousal support

In Canada, spousal support may be awarded upon divorce, under the federal Divorce Act, or upon separation without divorce under provincial statutes. There are generally three different forms of spousal support awarded:

1. Compensatory support – This form of support compensates an individual for her or his contributions to the relationship as well as for any losses that individual has suffered;
2. Non-compensatory support – In some cases support may be awarded on a needs basis. This form of support may be awarded by a Court where an individual is sick or disabled; and
3. Contractual support (divorce agreement) – This form of support upholds a contract between the parties which governs support payments.

Married spouses and common-law spouses

Both married spouses and common-law spouses may be entitled to spousal support. An important distinction between the two is that common-law spouses must start an action claiming spousal support within one year of the breakdown of the relationship. A second important distinction is that only married couples may divorce under the federal Divorce Act; common-law spouses may only separate under provincial legislation, such as Ontario's Family Law Act or British Columbia's Family Relation's Act. No such limitation arises for married individuals. In addition to being in a marriage or common-law relationship, courts will look at the conditions, means, needs and other circumstances of each spouse. This includes:

1. The length of time the spouses cohabited;
2. The functions performed by each spouse during the relationship; and
3. Any existing orders or agreements.

This is by no means an exhaustive list of factors which the court will consider when determining entitlement. Each case is determined on its own unique set of circumstances.

Factors for awarding spousal support

The federal Divorce Act at s.15.2 (6) states that there are four objectives of spousal support orders:

1. Recognize any economic advantages or disadvantages to the spouses arising from the marriage or its breakdown;
2. Apportion between the spouses any financial consequences arising from the care of any child of the marriage over and above any obligation for the support of any child of the marriage;
3. Relieve any economic hardship of the spouses arising from the breakdown of the marriage; and
4. In so far as practicable, promote the economic self-sufficiency of each spouse within a reasonable period of time.

Amount and duration

The longer the length of cohabitation and the greater the disparity between each party's incomes, the larger an award of spousal support will be and the longer the duration will be. Although there is no set formula to determine the exact amount and duration of spousal support, there are guidelines, referred to as the Spousal Support Advisory Guidelines, which provides ranges for both. the Spousal Support Advisory Guidelines calculate ranges for support after taking into account the relevant factors. Although the courts are not required to abide by the Spousal Support Advisory Guidelines, they are required to take them into account when deciding on the issue of spousal support. The length of the relationship will be taken into account when determining how long spousal support should be paid for. Awards for spousal support can be for a limited term or indefinite.

While declaring bankruptcy does not absolve Canadians of obligations to pay alimony or child support, a 2011 ruling by the Supreme Court of Canada established that under current laws "equalization payments agreed to as part of a divorce are considered debts, and are wiped off a person's balance sheet when they declare bankruptcy."

=== Czech Republic ===
Laws of the Czech Republic provide for spousal maintenance both during marriage and after divorce. As main principle, both spouses have the right for generally equal standard of living during the marriage.

The same "generally equal standard of living" applies also to post-divorce period in special cases, when the payee wasn't mostly responsible for the failure of marriage or did not agree with the divorce and the payee suffered serious harm due to the divorce and hadn't committed an act of domestic violence against the payer. In such case the payee may request alimony in amount providing "generally equal standard of living" for a period adequate to circumstances, but no longer than three years.

If those special conditions are not met, both of the divorced have mutual spousal maintenance obligation in case that one of them is not able to provide for themselves due to circumstances originating in marriage, if payment of alimony is reasonable under general circumstances that each of the divorced found themselves in.

=== England ===
English courts award spousal maintenance, either in a lump sum or in installments, when one party cannot support themselves without payments from the other party.

Under traditional English common law, a woman gave up her personal property rights on marriage (see Coverture). Upon separation from marriage, the husband retained the right to the wife's property, but, in exchange, had an ongoing responsibility to support the wife after dissolution of the marriage. English law was amended by legislation including the Married Women's Property Act 1870 and Married Women's Property Act 1882 which reformed women's property rights relating to marriage, by, for example, permitting divorced women to regain the property they owned before marriage.

=== India ===
Alimony in India is governed by personal laws based on religion:

Hindus: the Hindu Marriage Act, 1955.

Muslims: the Dissolution of Muslim Marriages Act, 1939, the Muslim Personal Law (Shariat) Application Act, 1937, Muslim Women (Protection of Rights on Divorce) Act, 1986 and Muslim Women (Protection of Rights on Marriage) Act, 2019.

Christians: the Divorce Act, 1869

Parsis: the Parsi Marriage and Divorce Act, 1936

Secular: the Special Marriage Act, 1954

=== Italy ===
The duty of mutual assistance of the spouses turns into an obligation of maintenance following the personal separation. The spouse who is not responsible for the separation has, in fact, the right to receive from the other "what is necessary for its maintenance" (Article 156 of the Italian Civil Code).

In case of dissolution of the marriage, art. 5, paragraph 6, of Law 898/1970 provides for the obligation for a spouse to periodically provide the other with a check "when the latter does not have adequate means or in any case cannot obtain them for objective reasons", the determination of which it is entrusted to certain specific parameters (conditions of the spouses, reasons for the decision, personal and economic contribution given by each to the family management and to the formation of the patrimony of each or the common one, income of both, duration of marriage).

=== Japan ===
Under the Japanese Civil Code, spousal support is available while the parties are married, but terminates upon divorce. Japanese courts typically award a one-time payment of isha-ryo, or consolation money, to the "wronged" spouse in the divorce, a type of compensation which does not exist in some other jurisdictions such as most U.S. states.

=== United States ===
In the U.S., state law establishes requirements regarding alimony (and child support) payments, recovery and penalties. A spouse trying to recover back alimony sometimes may use only the collection procedures that are available to all other creditors, such as reporting the amount due to a collection agency, or seek enforcement through contempt of court proceedings against an obligor who is able to pay but has failed to do so. Alimony obligations are not dischargeable in bankruptcy.

The determination of alimony varies greatly from state to state within the U.S. Some state statutes, including those of Texas, Montana, Kansas, Utah, Kentucky and Maine, give explicit guidelines to judges on the amount and/or duration of alimony. In Texas, Mississippi and Tennessee, for example, alimony is awarded only in cases of marriage or civil union of ten years or longer and the payments are limited to three years unless there are special, extenuating circumstances.

In Texas, there is a legal presumption that alimony is not appropriate. Only after the requesting spouse can reasonably demonstrate that they have given the best effort in good faith to secure an independent income but failed is a petition for alimony taken into consideration. The amount of spousal support in that may be awarded is limited to the lesser of $5,000 per month or 20% of the payee's gross income.

Some states, including California, Nevada and New York, have spousal support statutes that list factors that a judge should consider when determining alimony. In these states, the determination of duration and amount of alimony is left to the discretion of the family court judges as limited by legal precedent. In 2012, Massachusetts enacted alimony reform that set limits on alimony and eliminated lifetime alimony. In 2013, Colorado signed into law alimony reform, creating a standardized non-presumptive guideline upon which courts can rely.

In general, there are four types of alimony:

1. Temporary alimony: Support ordered when the parties are separated prior to divorce. Also called alimony pendente lite, which is Latin, meaning, "pending the suit".
2. Rehabilitative alimony: Support given to a lesser-earning spouse for a period of time necessary to acquire work outside the home and become self-sufficient.
3. Permanent alimony: Support paid to the lesser-earning spouse until the death of the payor, the death of the recipient, or the remarriage of the recipient.
4. Reimbursement alimony: Support given as a reimbursement for expenses incurred by a spouse during the marriage (such as educational expenses).

==== Prenuptial agreements ====
Prenuptial agreements are recognized in all fifty states and the District of Columbia, and every jurisdiction allows parties to agree to spousal support and alimony terms in a premarital or postnuptial agreement, if their marital agreement is prepared in accordance with state and federal law requirements. Divorce courts retain the discretion to refuse to enforce prenuptial agreement terms restricting a party's right to seek alimony if that party would have to seek public assistance as a result of the alimony waiver, or if the restriction on the right to seek alimony is unconscionable or unfair when the divorce occurs. Lack of financial disclosure prior to signing a prenuptial agreement or a post-nuptial agreement by the party against whom alimony is sought may also cause a court to invalidate a waiver of alimony provision. Prenuptial Agreements with valid alimony waivers or restrictions entered into in one state should be fully enforceable by the courts of another state in the event of a divorce, unless the terms of the prenuptial agreement violate the foreign jurisdiction's laws.

California is the only state with a law that requires that the parties be represented by counsel if spousal support (alimony) is limited by the agreement.

Instead of a complete waiver of the right to seek alimony, prenuptial agreements and post-nuptial agreements can also contain terms where the parties agree to a set amount of guaranteed alimony for the lower wage earner at the time of divorce, or a cap/limit on the amount of alimony either party can seek in the event of a divorce.

==== Reform ====
In the United States, family laws and precedents as they relate to divorce, community property and alimony vary based on state law. Also, with new family models, "working couples", "working wives", "stay-at-home dads", etc., there are situations where some parties to a divorce question whether traditional economic allocations made in a divorce are fair and equitable to the facts of their individual case. Some groups have proposed various forms of legislation to reform alimony parameters (i.e. amounts and term). Alimony terms are among the most frequent issues causing litigation in family law cases. Eighty percent of divorce cases involve a request for modification of alimony.

Some states (e.g. Florida, Texas, Maine) are moving away from permanent alimony awards that are intended to maintain a spouse's standard of living enjoyed during the marriage and are moving towards durational or rehabilitative alimony. In other states, like Mississippi and Tennessee, alimony is usually awarded for life.

Some of the critical issues that proponents and opponents of alimony reform disagree upon are:

- Whether alimony should be temporary or permanent
- Regardless of duration, should alimony payers have the unquestionable right to retire?
- Does the lesser earning spouse deserve alimony to meet his or her basic needs (sustenance) or enough to sustain "the lifestyle accustomed to during the civil union or marriage"?
- Should the income and assets of a new spouse be used in determining how much alimony gets paid?
- How clear and prescriptive should state statutes be versus allowing a larger degree of Judicial Discretion?

In 2012, bills were introduced in the New Jersey Assembly and Senate. The Assembly passed a bill calling for a Blue Ribbon Commission to address Alimony Reform. The Senate has a similar bill pending that has not yet been posted in the Judiciary Committee. The NJ Matrimonial Bar Association has been vehemently fighting against Alimony Reform, led by Patrick Judge Jr. chairman of the Family Law section of the New Jersey State Bar Association. Attorney Judge stated that the New Jersey State Bar Association ("NJSBA") objected to the inclusion of individuals with a vested interest in reforming alimony on the Blue Ribbon Commission and that the NJSBA supported the "establishment of a commission [to study alimony reform] but only as long as the commission is constituted so that a fair and unbiased review of the current alimony laws takes place…[and] should not be predisposed to an outcome…."

In 2023 Florida passed an alimony reform bill (SB 1416) which eliminated permanent alimony and established a process for allowing alimony payers to request modifications when they want to retire. The bill allowed judges to reduce or terminate alimony obligations based on a number of factors. The passage came after decades of contentious debate garnering three vetoes of similar bills. Some groups that were previously major opponents of the reform approved of the 2023 policy, such as Florida Family Fairness and The Florida Bar.

California, Connecticut, Georgia, Illinois, Oklahoma, New York, South Carolina, Tennessee, Utah, and West Virginia have all passed laws that allow for the modification or termination of alimony upon demonstration that the recipient is cohabitating with another person. In April 2009, the Governor of New Jersey, Jon Corzine, signed into law changes in the alimony statutes for his state which would bar alimony payments to parents who kill, abuse, or abandon their children.

== See also ==
- Filial responsibility laws, similar to alimony but the money is paid by children to impoverished parents
- Men's rights
- Palimony
- Women's rights
