= Diligence (Scots law) =

Term in Scots Law

Diligence is a term in Scots law with no single definition but is commonly used to describe debt collection and debt recovery proceedings against a debtor by a creditor in Scottish courts. The law of diligence is part of the law of actions in Scots private law. Accordingly, it is within the devolved competence of the Scottish Parliament.

Diligence is usually executed by Sheriff court officers but may also be carried out by messengers-at-arms.

There are many forms of diligence, largely involving creditors and debtors. The newest form of diligence, land attachment, will be introduced into Scots law when Part 4 of the Bankruptcy and Diligence (Scotland) Act 2007 is brought into force.

== Definition ==
Diligence has no single definition in Scots law, but it is recognised that there were at least four broad forms of 'diligence' proceedings. These include:

- Diligence for enforcement of a monetary obligation (e.g.: a personal right to repayment of a debt, a delictual obligation to pay damages)
- Diligence for enforcement of a non-monetary obligation recognised by a court decree (pronounced 'Dee Cree', known in other jurisdictions as a court order) (e.g.: an obligation to deliver property to a litigant).
- Diligence in security of future or contingent debts owed to a creditor, where the debtor is insolvent or likely to dispose of the property.
- Diligence on the dependence, a form of interim order by a court issued where a future court decree (i.e.: court order) is unlikely to be satisfied.

The history of diligence is obscure, with the first substantial historical research carried out in the 18th century. Subsequent research was undertaken in the 19th century, and in the 20th century.

In modern usage, the term diligence relates mainly to enforcement of monetary obligations (i.e.: debts). There are many forms of debt related diligences, but it is common for them to be categorised as either 'seize' diligence or 'freeze' diligence because of the nature of the legal effect of each form of diligence. Historically, it was required for the debtor to have letters of horning issued against them and their name placed in the Register of Hornings, but modern law has replaced that.

=== Debt related diligence ===
Debt related diligences, as an enforcement of a monetary obligation owed by a debtor to a creditor, usually form part of the third stage of debt collection. This is often the type of diligence discussed when the term diligence is used in Scotland. The three stages of debt recovery in Scotland are:

1. The 'informal stage' in which a creditor pursuers the debtor for payment of the debt informally.
2. The 'court stage' in which a creditor sues the debtor for payment of a debt in a Scottish court.
3. The 'diligence stage'' in which a creditor seeks to recover the debt by raising a subsequent action of diligence against the debtor.

Despite being the final stage in debt recovery proceedings, diligence is commonly used by creditors as a final means falling the exhaustion of obtaining payment of a debt in the first or second stages. Between 2018 and 2019, 272,692 actions of diligence were carried out in Scotland. These statistics are collected by the [[Accountant in BankruptcyAccountant-in-Bankruptcy], on behalf of the Lord Advocate, based on the statutory reporting obligation by Sheriff court officers and Messengers-at-Arms, the court officers of Scotland.

== Current Sources of Law ==
There are many statutes dealing with the law of debt-related diligences, these include:

- Debtors (Scotland) Act 1987
- Abolition of Poindings and Warrant Sales Act 2001
- Debt Arrangement and Attachment (Scotland) Act 2002
- Bankruptcy and Diligence (Scotland) Act 2007

For older forms of diligence, such as adjudication, common law rules continue to apply.

== Debtor protections from debt-related diligence ==
=== Debt Advice and Information Package (DAIPs) ===
A debtor who is a natural person is entitled to receive a Debt Advice and Information Package when diligence proceedings are raised against him. First introduced under the Debt Arrangement and Attachment (Scotland) Act 2002, the document sets out the debtor's legal rights and where professional support and guidance on debt issues is available. The current DAIP booklet can be viewed on the Accountant-in-Bankruptcy website. While each form of diligence has specific requirements for the services of a DAIP, they generally must be issued at least 12 weeks prior to the commencement of diligence.

=== Debt Arrangement Schemes (DAS) ===
A debtor can avoid diligence by entering into a debt arrangement scheme (DAS). The scheme allows a debtor to arrange repayment of debt under a statutory debt payment programme administered by the DAS Administrator, part of the Accountant-in-Bankruptcy. This is the only statutory debt repayment scheme available in the United Kingdom.

However, before debtors enter into a DAS, they must have obtained advice from a money adviser. The Scottish Financial Health Service provides such money advice, as well as other advisory and charitable organisations such as the Citizens Advice Bureau. a debtors makes a DAS application, it must be accompanied by a declaration from a money adviser that advice has been provided.

A DAS usually must have the consent of the creditor to be approved. However where consent by the creditor is not given, the DAS Administrator must approve the application where the proposed programme is "fair and reasonable".

Where a DAS has been approved, the debtor is immune from the commencement of diligence proceedings. The DAS Administrator maintains a DAS Register, recording information relating to debt payment programmes, including the debtor's personal information.

=== Time to Pay Directions ===
Another protection available to debtors are Time to Pay Directions. Time to Pay Directions are available to debtors at the commencement of court proceedings, the award of a decree against them through to the service of a charge to pay (see below). They allow a debtor to ask the court for a period of time to repay the debt sued for by instalments or lump sum payments.

The court must take into account a number of factors, including the debtor's financial position, in making Time to Pay Directions.

Time to Pay Directions are not available for debts:

- That exceed £10,000 or other amount prescribed by the Lord Advocate in secondary legislation.
- relating to divorce proceedings.
- connected to maintenance orders or liability orders, typically dealing with child maintenance.
- from actions commenced by HM Revenue and Customs or Revenue Scotland.
- relating to the payment of road tax.

Where a court makes the Time to Pay Direction or Order, the debtor is immune from the commencement of diligence against it.

== Forms of debt-related diligence ==
=== Diligence Against Property ===
==== Attachment ====
Attachment is a form of diligence that allows a creditor to seize and sell a debtor's corporeal moveable property (i.e..: property that can be physically moved such as cars, jewellery and clothes). Only corporeal moveable property that is owned by the debtor can be seized and removed. However, a sheriff court officer is entitled to proceed on the assumption that any property in possession of debtors is also owned by them.

Attachment replaced the diligence of poinding after a sustained political campaign by the Scottish Socialist Party leader, Tommy Sheridan MSP.

===== Process of Attachment =====
====== Charge to pay ======
Prior to the commencement of attachment proceedings, a charge to pay must be served on debtors to call on them to make payment within a certain number of days. Upon expiry of the charge days without payment, creditors may launch legal proceedings against debtors.

====== Debt Advice and Information Package (DAIP) ======
A DAIP, as discussed above, must be served on the debtor who is a natural person at least 12 weeks in advance of the execution of the attachment.

====== Valuation and Service of Schedule of Goods ======
Following service of the charge to pay and DAIP, the creditor may instruct sheriff officers to attend a debtor's premises. Thereafter, sheriff officers will attend the debtor's premises to value property for sale. Sheriff officers are allowed to enter shut and locked premises for the purposes of valuation. Property should be valued at the price that it could obtain if it were sold on the open market.

Following valuation of the corporeal moveable property, sheriff officers must immediately make a schedule identifying all corporeal moveable property owned by the debtor. The schedule must then be given to the debtor or a copy of it left at the premises. All property listed in the schedule is known as the attached articles. Any person interfering with an attached article is liable to conviction for contempt of court and liable to the creditor for the value of the interfered attached article.

Thereafter, a report signed by the sheriff officer]] must be submitted to the Sheriff court, including a copy of the Schedule of Goods, within 14 days of execution.

===== Circumstances where attachment cannot take place =====
====== Certain days ======
Attachment is not possible on certain days. This includes:

- Sundays
- Local or National public holidays in the area where the Attachment is to be executed
- Any other days prescribed by Act of Sederunt

====== Certain Times ======
Attachment may be carried out only between 8am to 8pm unless the sheriff court has specially authorised attachment outwith those times.

===== Exempt Articles =====
Certain property is exempt from being attached. This includes:

- Any articles inside the debtor's dwellinghouse require a further exceptional attachment;
- Any articles inside mobile homes and the mobile home itself;
- Any implements, tools of trade, books or other equipment reasonably required for the use of the debtor in the practice of the debtor's profession, trade or business and not exceeding in aggregate total value £1,000;
- any vehicle, the use of which is so reasonably required by the debtor, not exceeding in value £1,000 or such amount as may be prescribed in regulations made by the Scottish Ministers;
- any tools or other equipment reasonably required for the purpose of keeping in good order and condition any garden or yard adjacent to, or associated with, a dwellinghouse in which the debtor resides;
- any money, which can be attached under money attachment.

===== Removal and Auction =====
Following submission of the valuation report to the sheriff court, the Sheriff Officer has six months in which to remove the attached articles from the debtor's premises and sell the attached articles at roup (Scots term for a public auction). Following the roup, the sheriff officer must submit another report to the sheriff court that ends the diligence process.

==== Attachment of articles inside a dwelling house: Exceptional attachment ====
A special form of attachment exists to recover corporeal moveable property inside a debtor's home, which is known as exceptional attachment and can be legally executed following the creditor obtaining an exceptional attachment order from the debtor's local Sheriff Court. The rules for exceptional attachment are found in Part 3 of the Debt Arrangement and Attachment (Scotland) Act 2002.

===== Obtaining an Exceptional Attachment Order =====
To obtain articles kept inside a debtor's home, the creditor must raise diligence proceedings in the sheriff court. Obtaining an exceptional attachment order allows the creditor to:

1. Attach, remove and auction at roup any of the debtor's non-essential assets kept in his/her dwellinghouse.
2. Carry out the attachment process during a specified period of time during the order
3. Open and shut any lockfast dwellinghouses, or part of it, for the purpose of carrying out the attachment process.

However, to grant the order, the sheriff must be satisfied that there are exceptional circumstances to merit the granting of the order. MacNeil describes these exceptional circumstances in short as "essentially, there must be no other way for the creditor to recoup the debt".

===== Essential Assets =====
An exceptional attachment order allows only non-essential assets to be removed from the debtor's home. Schedule 2 of the Debt Arrangement and Attachment (Scotland) Act 2002 outlines what is classified as essential goods. Essential assets include the following property that is reasonably required:

- Clothing
- Trade tools, books or other equipment used in a debtor's, or family member''s, profession, trade or business
- Medical aids and medical equipment
- Books or other property reasonably required for use by the debtor, or family members.
- Items reasonably required for the care or upbringing of a child who is a member of the debtor's household
- Beds
- Bedding
- Linens
- Chairs
- Settees
- Food
- Lights or light fittings
- Heating appliances
- Curtains
- Floor coveringss
- Furniture, equipment or utensils used for storing, cooking or eating food
- Refrigerators
- Equipment for cleaning, drying, mending or pressing clothes
- Cleaning equipment
- Storage furniture for clothing, bedding or linen
- Storage furniture for cleaning equipment
- Storage furniture for utensils for food cooking or eating
- Safety appliances
- DIY tools
- Computers and its accessories
- Microwave Ovens
- Radios
- Telephones
- Televisions

Where the above items are reasonably required by the debtor, they are exempt for attachment, removal and auction by the creditor.

===== Process =====
Similar to general attachment, exceptional attachment authorises a court officer to open shut and lockfast homes. However, the officer must give at least four days' notice of the intended time of entry to the home. The notice period can be removed under authorisation of the sheriff. Importantly, a person must be present in the home at the time of the officer's entry who is over 16 years old and has legal capacity to understand the consequences of the attachment procedure.

==== Money Attachment ====
For monies, that is cash (coin and banknotes) and banking instruments (cheques, money orders, promissory notes and postal orders), seizure may occur through the diligence of money attachment. The rules for money attachment are found in the Diligence and Bankruptcy (Scotland) Act 2007.

Money attachment can be raised where a debt has been recognised judicially by a court decree (order) or document and the debtor has been charged to pay. Money attachment cannot take place in relation to monies kept within a debtor's home.

===== Process of Money Attachment =====
====== Charge to Pay ======
Prior to the commencement of attachment proceedings, a charge to pay must be served on debtors that calls on them to make payment within a certain number of days. Upon expiry of the charge days without payment, the creditor may launch legal proceedings against the debtor. However, the creditor must also wait 12 weeks after the service of a DAIP.

====== Debt Advice and Information Package (DAIP) ======
A DAIP, discussed above, must be served on a natural person debtor at least 12 weeks in advance of the execution of the money attachment.

====== Seizure ======
Following the making of a money attachment order by the relevant court, court officers may go to a debtor's premises (other than the debtor's home) to attach any monies kept there. The officer is entitled to a presumption that the debtor owns any money found in the premises. However, prior to seizing the monies, the officer must make enquiries as to the ownership of the monies sought. The officer is not prevented from relying on the presumption by an assertion is made that the money is not owned by the debtor.

The court officer must deposit any cash attached (i.e.: seized) into a bank account. A court officer is entitled not to attach banking instruments other than cheques (i.e.: money orders, promissory notes and postal orders) unless expressly instructed by the creditor.

===== Circumstances where money attachment cannot take place =====
====== Certain days ======
Money attachment is not possible on certain days. This includes:

- Sundays
- Local or National Public holidays
- Any other days prescribed by Act of Sederunt

====== Certain times ======
Attachment may be carried outonly between 8am to 8pm unless the Sheriff Court has specially authorised attachment outwith those times.

===== Schedule of Money Attachment =====
Following the completion of the seizure of any monies, the court officer must immediately complete a document known as a schedule of money attachment, which must be in a manner stipulated by an Act of Sederunt. It must be signed by the court officer. Following the completion of the schedule, a copy must be given to the debtor or left at the debtor's premises.

===== Report of Money Attachment =====
Within 14 days of the seizure of the monies, the court officer must send a report of money attachment to the sheriff court. which must be in a manner stipulated by an Act of Sederunt. It must be signed by the court officer. A copy must also be given to the debtor. If the report is refused by the sheriff, the money attachment ceases to have effect.

===== Payment Order =====
Following the lodging of the Report by the court officer, a creditor may apply for a Payment Order allowing the creditor to have the attached monies paid to him. A debtor is entitled to oppose the application and have his representations heard. Without any opposition, and the sheriff is satisfied there is no material irregularity in the above processes and that the monies are owned by the debtor; the sheriff must approve the application. Thereafter, the monies attached may be paid to the creditor.

==== Arrestment ====
Arrestment is a form of diligence that initially attaches (i.e.: 'freezees' property owned by the debtor) and subsequently 'seizes' any incorporeal moveable or corporeal moveable property owned by the debtor but is in possession of a third party. Accordingly, there are three parties in the diligence proceedings: the creditor (termed the arrester), the debtor (termed the common debtor) and the third party (termed the arrestee).

Following attachment of the property, which importantly includes any incorporeal property such as a contractual right to payment, arrestment allows an action of furthcoming to be raised in Scottish courts compelling the third party to deliver the property or make payment to the creditor in place of the debtor. The rules of the diligence of arrestment originate in Scots common law but are largely now found in the Debtors (Scotland) Act 1987.

===== Process of Arrestment =====
====== Basis for Arrestment ======
Arrestment is may be raised only in execution of court decree or a document of debt.

Decrees that are permitted include those from Courts of Scotland, as well as judgments of foreign courts that are enforceable in Scotland under Scots private international law.

Documents of debt are typically legal documents such as contracts and deeds registered in the Books of Council and Session, allowing the arrester to avoid the second stage of debt recovery, the court stage (see above).

====== Arrestment Proceedings Based on a Decree ======
Following the obtention of a court decree, the creditor may commence diligence provided that certain requirements are met to protect the debtor, see above. For arrestment, that is the service of a charge to pay on the debtor in advance of the commencement of legal proceedings. Upon expiry of the charge days without payment, the creditor may launch legal proceedings against the debtor. Thereafter, the creditor may serve a formal document on the third party (the arrestee) known as a Schedule of Arrestment. The document must be in a manner stipulated by the Scottish Ministers, currently found in Schedule 7 of the Diligence (Scotland) Regulations 2009.

After receipt of the Schedule of Arrestment, the third party (arrestee) has three weeks in which to complete and send to the creditor, the debtor and any other interested party a formal document known as Form of Disclosure by Arrestee. The document sets out what property the arrestee (third party) holds for the debtor and the value of such property. The Form of Disclosure by Arrestee must be in a manner stipulated by the Scottish Ministers, currently found in Schedule 8 of the Diligence (Scotland) Regulations 2009.

====== Property Subject to Arrestment ======
Two classes of property in Scots law are capable of arrestment: corporeal moveable (i.e.: physical property that can be moved) and incorporeal moveable (i.e.: property with no physical presence). In practice, hat means a broad range of property held by a third party can be arrested, such as:

- Corporeal property in possession of a third party.
- An obligation held by the debtor enforceable against a third party.
- Money held in a bank account, the third party in those circumstances being the bank. However, any arrestment of bank accounts is subject to a Protected Minimum Balance. a minimum amount of money in a debtor's bank account that is exempt from arrestment, which is currently £529.90.

====== Action of Furthcoming ======
Following arrestment of the corporeal moveable property, the creditor can raise an action of furthcoming to have the sheriff court authorise the sale of the property, with the proceeds paid to the creditor.

==== Diligence Against Earnings ====
Diligence against earnings allows a creditor to recover debt via the debtor's wages paid by an employer. The rules for diligence against earnings are found in Part 3 of the Debtors (Scotland) Act 1987. The rules are similar to arrestment by service of a formal document on the debtor's employer. There are three forms of diligence against earnings, namely:

1. Earnings Arrestment. This can be launched by a single creditor against a debtor's employer.
2. Conjoined Arrestment. This form of diligence can be raised by two or more creditors, which avoids the use of sequestration.
3. Current Maintenance Arrestment. This form of diligence can be used where the debtor is liable to pay child maintenance, also known as aliment.

The amount of instalments and proportion of a debtor's wages that an employer (the arrestee) must pay to the creditor is determined in legislation.

===== Charge to Pay =====
Prior to the commencement of arrestment proceedings, a charge to pay must be served on the debtors and calls on them to make payment within a certain number of days. Upon expiry of the charge days without payment, the creditor may commence diligence against the debtor. However, the creditor must also wait 12 weeks after the service of a DAIP.

===== Debt Advice and Information Package (DAIP) =====
A DAIP, discussed above, must be served on a natural person debtor at least 12 weeks in advance of the execution of the earnings arrestment.

==== Admiralty Arrestment ====
Admiralty arrestment allows a creditor to arrest any ships owned by the debtor, including any cargo on board. The ship and cargo will be prevented from leaving a Scottish port until payment of the debt is received by the creditor. The rules for admiralty arrestment are found in the Bankruptcy and Diligence (Scotland) Act 2007.

==== Inhibition ====
Inhibition allows a creditor to inhibit (i.e.: 'freeze') any real rights a debtor holds in corporeal heritable property (land), such as a right of ownership. It is an old form of diligence with a substantial history in Scots law. There are two forms of inhibition, namely:

- Inhibition in execution of a court decree.
- Inhibition on a document of debt. Documents of debt are typically legal documents such as contracts and deeds registered in the Books of Council and Session, which allows the arrester to avoid the second stage of debt recovery, the court stage (see above)

The rules for each form of inhibition are similar and regulated by Part 5 of the Bankruptcy and Diligence (Scotland) Act 2007.

===== Inhibition Process =====
A creditor must serve on the debtor a schedule of inhibition (and a DAIP, see above, where the debtor is a natural person) through a court officer. The court officer must then complete a certificate of service. Both the certificate and schedule must then be registered in the Register of Inhibitions. Alternatively, a notice of inhibition can first be registered in the Register of Inhibitions and the schedule of inhibition served on the debtor within 21 days.

Inhibition prevents a debtor from creating or delivering a deed to a grantee in relation to the inhibited property. A creditor with inhibition may seek reduction (i.e.: rescission) of a deed made in breach of the inhibition. The inhibition will prescribe after five years. However, the creditor's right to reduce a deed made in breach of an inhibition will prescribe after 20 years.

==== Adjudication for Debt ====
Adjudication for debt, commonly termed adjudication, allows a creditor to obtain a security in a debtor's property and a later power to sell the debtor's property. It was first introduced into Scots law under the Adjudications Act 1672, replacing an older form of diligence known as apprising or comprising.

==== Adjudication Process ====
Adjudication must be raised in the Court of Session, contrary to other forms of diligence, which may be carried out after the initial court stage. If satisfied, the Outer House of the Court of Session will issue a decree for adjudication, which for adjudicated land must then be registered in the Land Register. Upon registration in the Land Register, the creditor obtains a security in the property. The creditor mau eject the debtor and let out the property for up to seven years. If the property is residential property, with the debtor still living in it as home, the creditor must also comply with the provisions of the Home Owner and Debtor Protection (Scotland) Act 2010.

The creditor may not sell the property for a period of ten years. Afterward, a creditor may raise an action of declarator of expiry of the legal in the Court of Session to obtain ownership of the property. Upon sale of the property, the creditor will receive payment of the debt (offset against any rents paid by a tenant) to satisfy any remaining debt. The remaining proceeds of the sale will be paid to the debtor.

===== Abolition of Adjudication : Land Attachment and Residual Attachment =====
The Bankruptcy and Diligence (Scotland) Act 2007 provides for the abolition of adjudication for the debt and its replacement with a new form of diligence, land attachment. For other classes of property, the new diligence to replace adjudication will be known as residual attachment. This will also change the Registers of Inhibitions and Adjudications into the Register of Inhibitions alone. However, the relevant provisions of the 2007 Act has yet to be brought into forcem and it remains to be seen whether they ever will be.

In 2016, the Accountant-in-Bankruptcy indicated that it will commence work with stakeholders to investigate the possibility of bringing land attachment into force.

==== Diligence Against the Person: Civil Imprisonment ====
Historically, it was possible to do diligence against a person (both natural and juristic), including civil imprisonment. That included issuance of a letter of horning and the recording of the letter in the Register of Hornings. The debtor would be 'put to the horn', where a messenger-at-arms would read the letters of horning aloud, blow a horn three times and denounce the debtor as an outlaw.

Thereafter, the messenger-at-arms would affix the letters of horning to the market cross of the burgh in which the debtor resided. Proof of execution and the letter of horning would require registration in the Register of Hornings to complete the process of declaring the debtor as an outlaw. Thereafter, the creditor could obtain letters of caption to authorise the imprisonment of the debtor.

The debtor could seek sanctuary by remaining within the confines of Holyrood Park, subject only to the jurisdiction of the Bailie of the Park, who could imprison the debtor in the Abbey Jail at Holyrood Abbey. However, after the passage of the Debtors (Scotland) Act 1880, it is no longer possible to carry out imprison a person for debt. Letters of horning themselves could no longer following the Debtors (Scotland) Act 1987. However, the 1890 Act provided for civil imprisonment in the following circumstances:

- Civil imprisonment for unpaid aliment and child support.

In those circumstances, an individual may continue to be imprisoned in relation to an unpaid debt if the custodial sentence is less than 12 months. Civil imprisonment for taxes, fines, rates has been abolished by the Debtors (Scotland) Act 1987.

=== Historic and Miscellaneous Forms of Diligence ===
==== Adjudication in Security ====
This form of diligence allows a creditor to seize property where there is a reasonable belief the debtor is on the verge of insolvency. Once a decree for adjudication in security is issued, a similar process as adjudication for debt is followed (see above). Adjudication in Security should be abolished if section 127 of the Bankruptcy and Diligence (Scotland) Act 2007 is brought into force.

==== Creditor Confirmation as Executor ====
This form of diligence allows a creditor to seek confirmation from the court as an executor if the debtor dies so that the debt can be recovered from the debtor's estate. It can be raised only where another individual has not been confirmed as executor by the court.

==== Maills and Duties ====
This form of diligence was available to secured creditors where the secured heritable property (ie: land, including the building and structures upon it) have been leased. It allowed the creditor to recover the debt by receiving the rent for the property directly. It was in effect abolished by the Conveyancing and Feudal Reform (Scotland) Act 1970. It will be formally abolished if section 207 of the Bankruptcy and Diligence (Scotland) Act 2007 is brought into force.

==== Poinding ====
Poinding was a diligence that allowed a creditor to seize moveable property from a debtor. Its usage was recommended for abolishment by the Scottish Law Commission's Report on Poinding and Warrant Sales, (Scot Law Com No 177) (2000) and was formally abolished by the Abolition of Poindings and Warrant Sales Act 2001. Another type of diligence, real poinding, allowed a secured creditor to recover a debt by seizing goods held on the secured land by the 2001 Act.

==== Sequestration for Rent ====
Sequestration for rent was a diligence that allowed a landlord creditor to recover unpaid rent arrears from a debtor by seizing property under the landlord's hypothec. It was abolished under the Bankruptcy and Diligence (Scotland) Act 2007.

==== Diligence on the Dependence ====
Diligence on the dependence allows a pursuer in an action to secure a defender's property, pending the outcome of the litigation. That is permitted for the following forms of diligence:

- Arrestment
- Attachment
- Inhibition

== Law Reform ==
The law relating to diligence has been subject of many reports by the Scottish Law Commission, including:

- Scottish Law Commission, Report on Diligence and Debtor Protection, (Scot Law Com No 95), (1985).
- Scottish Law Commission, Discussion Paper on Adjudications for Debt and Related Matters (Scot Law Com DP no. 78) (1988).
- Scottish Law Commission, Report on Statutory Fees For Arrestees, (Scot Law Com No 133), (1992).
- Scottish Law Commission, Report on Diligence on the Dependence and Admiralty Arrestments, (Scot Law Com No 164), (1998).
- Scottish Law Commission, Report on Poinding and Warrant Sales, (Scot Law Com No 177), (2000).
- Scottish Law Commission, Report on Diligence, (Scot Law Com No 183), (2001).

The reports' recommendations have led to reform of the law of diligence. They are available to view for free online at the Scottish Law Commission's website.
