= Letters of horning =

Document outlawing a debtor in Scots law

Letters of horning (Scots law): a document (i.e., letters) issued by civil authorities that publicly denounce a person as an outlaw. The document was issued against persons who had not paid their debts.

Historically, the documents would be announced by three blasts of a horn, and the documents themselves came to be known as "letters of horning". A person who was denounced in these documents was described as having been "put to the horn".

== History ==
Originally in Scotland, imprisonment for debt was enforceable only in certain cases, but a custom gradually grew up of taking the debtor's oath to pay. If the debtor broke his oath, he became liable to the discipline of the Church. The civil power could step in to aid the ecclesiastical, denouncing the debtor as an outlaw, imprisoning his person and confiscating his goods. The method of declaring a person an outlaw was by giving three blasts on a horn and publicly proclaiming the fact; hence the expression "put to the horn".

The subsequent process, a warrant directing a messenger-at-arms to charge the debtor to pay or perform in terms of the letters, was called letters of horning. This system of execution was simplified by the Debtors (Scotland) Act 1838 (1 & 2 Vict. c. 114), and execution was thereafter usually by diligence (see writ of execution).

The granting of letters of horning, letters of horning and poinding, letters of poinding, and letters of caption all ceased to be competent following the passage of the Debtors (Scotland) Act 1987. The Register of Hornings is superseded by the Register of Inhibitions and is kept by Registers of Scotland.
