= Great Seal of Scotland =

National seal of Scotland

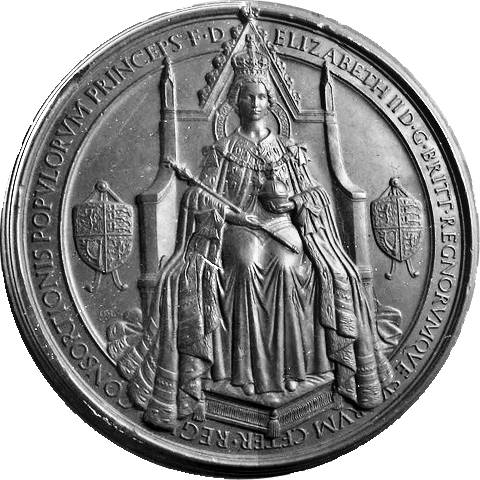
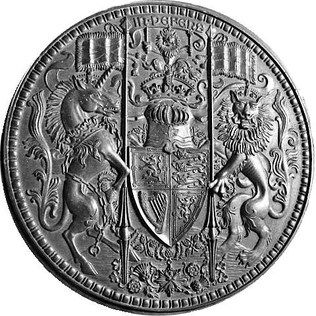
Obverse and reverse (with Coat of Arms) of the Great Seal of Elizabeth II

The Great Seal of Scotland (Scottish Gaelic: Seala Mòr na h-Alba; also the Scottish Seal; formally the Seal appointed by the Treaty of Union to be kept and made use of in place of the Great Seal of Scotland) is a seal used by the first minister of Scotland to seal letters patent signed by the monarch giving royal assent to bills passed by the Scottish Parliament.

The Great Seal of Scotland is the principal national symbol of Scotland that allows the monarch to authorise official documents without having to sign each document individually. Wax is melted in a metal mould or matrix and impressed into a wax figure that is attached by cord or ribbon to documents that the monarch wishes to make official. The earliest seal impression, in the Treasury of Durham Cathedral, is believed to be the Great Seal of Duncan II and dates to 1094. During the reign of Mary I, the thistle was incorporated into the design of the Great Seal, segmenting the thistle's status as a national Scottish symbol.

The Privy Seal of Scotland is separate from that of the Great Seal of Scotland. The Privy Seal was the Scottish monarch's private or personal seal, with the earliest known Seal to have been used was during the reign of Alexander III. The Privy Seal of Scotland's last official record of usage was in 1898. The Privy Seal of Scotland and the associated office of Keeper of the Privy Seal of Scotland have never formally been abolished. The office of Keeper of the Privy Seal has been vacant since the death of Gavin Campbell, 1st Marquess of Breadalbane in 1922.

The National Records of Scotland are responsible for the physical sealing of letters patent, commissions, royal warrants and charters with the Great Seal of Scotland as well as holding the records of the Great Seal of Scotland. The earliest known records to be held by the Nations Records of Scotland date from 1315. The first minister of Scotland is the current keeper of the Great Seal of Scotland and it is considered as one of the highest honours of the office of the first minister.

== History ==
=== Kingdom of Scotland ===
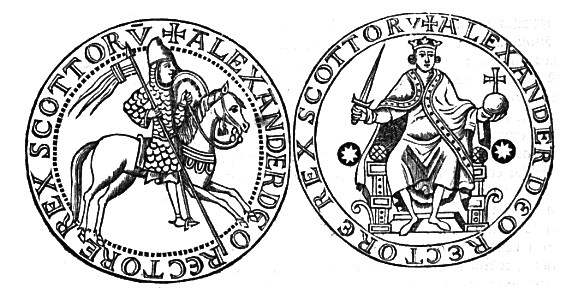
The Great Seal under the reign of Alexander I of Scotland

In the Kingdom of Scotland, an independent sovereign country, the chancellor of Scotland had the custody of the King's Seal. The register of the Great Seal of Scotland is Scotland's oldest national record having served as a means by which the Monarch signs official documents in Scotland and documents relating to Scots law for over 700 years.

Prior to the Union of the Crowns in 1603, the King of Scots had provided Royal Assent to acts of the Scottish Parliament by touching the Scottish Sceptre (part of the Honours of Scotland), to a copy of any bill introduced by the Parliament of Scotland. King James VI of Scotland stated that no law was permitted to pass and become law in Scotland "without his scepter put to it for giving force of law". Following the Union of the Crowns, the seal was adapted under the reign of James VI and I (James VI of Scotland, and James I of England and Ireland). The seal was first used in 1603 until 1605 and notably featured a change of coat of arms on the seal. The coat of arms featured on the Great Seal under James VI contained the arms of both Scotland and Ireland and also featured differences to the legend which featured on the seal. Such changes were an indication of the union with Scotland, England and Ireland under one monarch as a result of the Union of the Crowns which came into effect in 1603.

Following the Union of the Crowns, as the King of Scotland was no longer considered to be an official resident in Edinburgh, most procedures related to the usage of the Great Seal of Scotland was carried out by a High Commissioner who acted on behalf of the monarch. "Logistical difficulties" were described as a result of the passing of the responsibilities from the monarch to a High Commissioner following the Union of the Crowns. It was described that "Commissioners had to be adequately instructed in London as to what was allowable before the session commenced in Edinburgh, and sometimes members opposed to court policy used the hesitancy of royal assent to criticise the competence of government ministers". During the period which Scotland was under the Commonwealth (1652–1660), the Great Seal was changed to depict Oliver Cromwell who was the Lord Protector of the Commonwealth. The seal depicted a Cromwell equestrian figure with long hair and wearing a sash and armour. On the reverse side, a view of troops with a landscape in the background was featured. The Coat of Arms of Scotland featured on the seal with English language inscriptions.

The Great Seal as used by Robert the Bruce were discovered in 2017, however, concerns quickly arose over the legitimacy of the seals. The Great Seal of Scotland used under the reign of Robert the Bruce carried the inscription Robert, by the Grace of God, King of the Scots. Despite questions being raised surrounding the authenticity of the seals, they were described as "still being of significance to the history of Scotland".

=== Treaty of Union and devolution ===
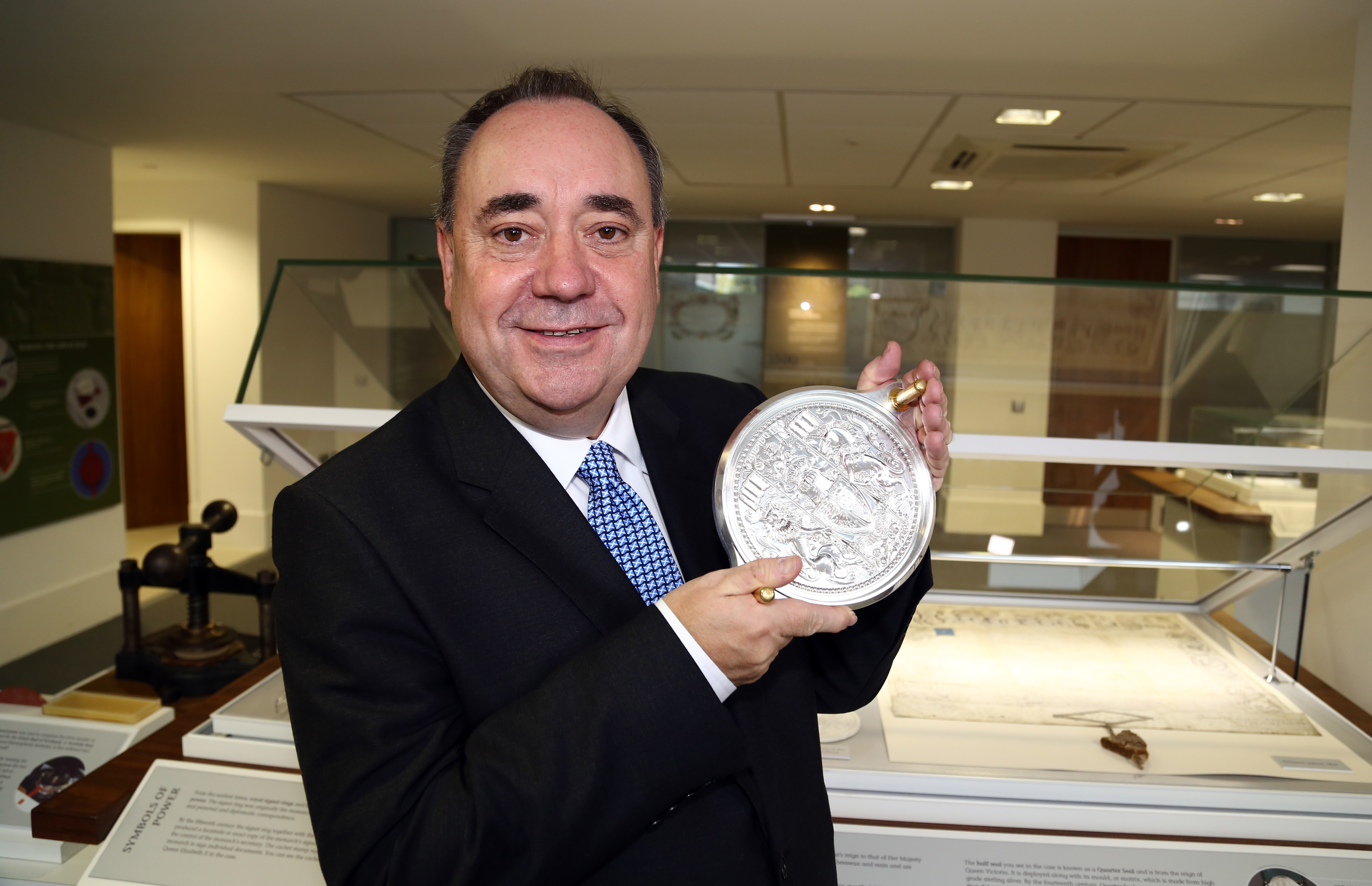
First Minister and Keeper of the Great Seal Alex Salmond with the Seal of Scotland

Strictly, the continuation of the Great Seal of Scotland was guaranteed by the Treaty of Union which provided that "a Seal in Scotland after the Union be alwayes kept and made use of in all things relating to private Rights or Grants, which have usually passed the Great Seal of Scotland, and which only concern Offices, Grants, Commissions, and private Rights within that Kingdom". Hence, the Scotland Act 1998 refers to the current seal as "the seal appointed by the Treaty of Union to be kept and made use of in place of the Great Seal of Scotland". Nevertheless, the seal is still commonly referred to as the Great Seal of Scotland.

Under the terms of the Treaty of Union, a new Great Seal of Great Britain was to be created, however, it was to be different from the Great Seals of both the Kingdom of Scotland and the Kingdom of England. The new Great Seal of Great Britain did not formally replace the Great Seal of Scotland, and the Great Seal of Scotland continued its status as the official national seal of Scotland despite the new British seal often being credited as being a replacement of the Scottish seal.

Section 12 of the Treason Act 1708 (7 Ann. c. 21), still in force today, makes it treason in Scotland to counterfeit the seal.

The Great Seal is administered by the keeper of the Great Seal, one of the Great Officers of State. From 1885 this office was held by the secretary for Scotland, later the Secretary of State for Scotland. It transferred in 1999 to the first minister of Scotland, whose place in the order of precedence in Scotland is determined by his or her office as keeper of the Great Seal. In practice the Seal is in the custody of the keeper of the Registers of Scotland, who has been appointed as deputy keeper.

During a Zeppelin air raid over Edinburgh, the capital city of Scotland, in April 1916 during World War I, concerns quickly arose regarding the safety and protection of both the Great Seal of Scotland and the Honours of Scotland. A letter to the Keeper of the Great Seal, the Secretary of State for Scotland Thomas McKinnon Wood, proposed that the Great Seal and the Honours of Scotland to be stored in a vault in Edinburgh Castle for protection from bombing, fire and theft. This followed a German bomb exploding close to the Crown Room of Edinburgh Castle whereby it was discovered that the Crown Room in the castle could not be made blast proof without a considerable amount of investment which would have been deemed impractical during the war.

== Features of the Great Seal ==
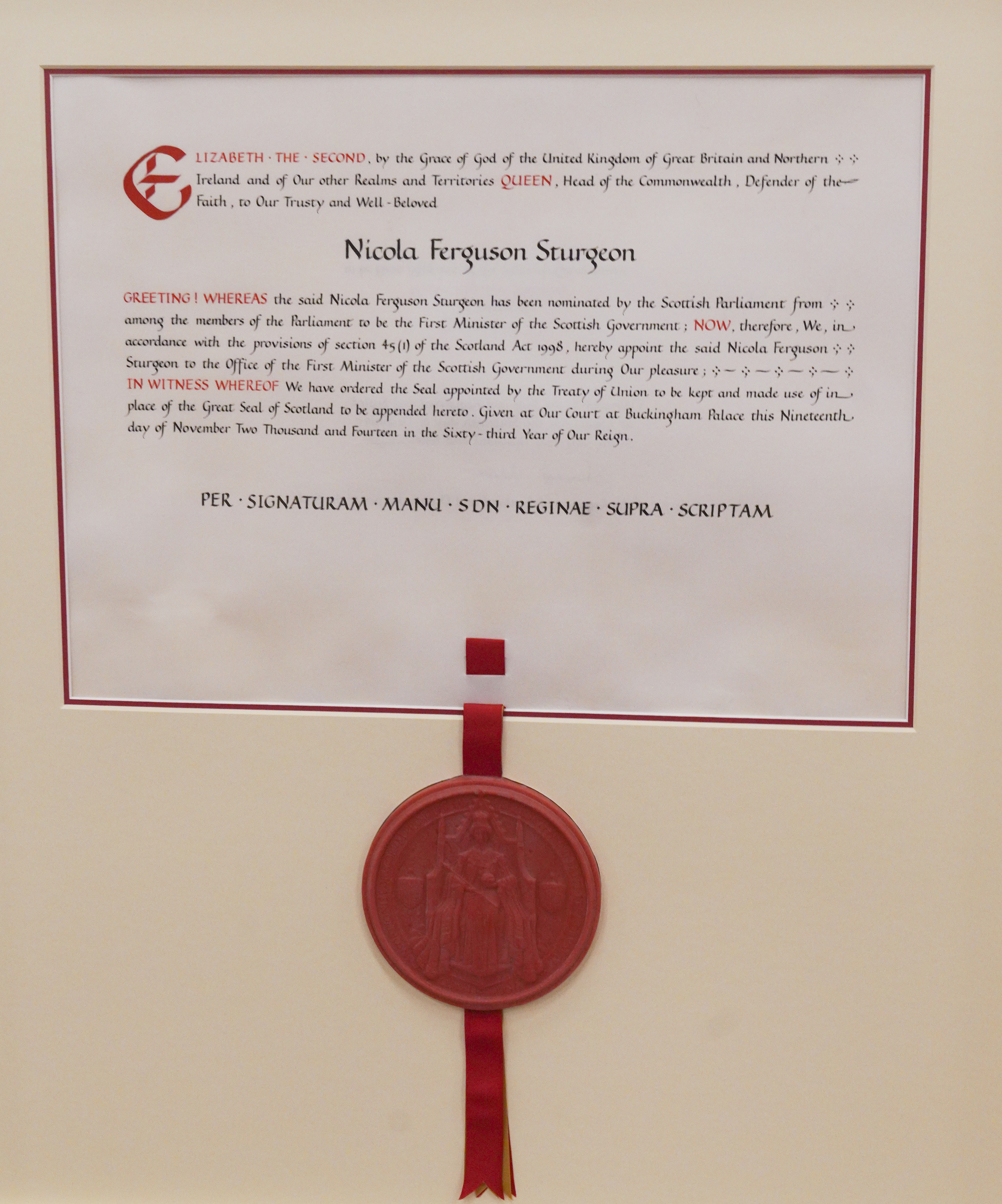
The Great Seal of Scotland during the premiership of Nicola Sturgeon

=== Design ===
The obverse side, struck during the reign of Elizabeth II, features the monarch, while the reverse depicts the Royal Arms as used in Scotland. The obverse is inscribed "ELIZABETH II D G BRITT REGNORVMQVE SVORVM CETER REGINA CONSORTIONIS POPULORUM PRINCEPS F D" and the figure on it is the same as on the Great Seal of the United Kingdom.

The design of the Great Seal is the responsibility of the Lord Lyon King of Arms.

=== Usage ===
Royal Commissions are granted by the reigning monarch under usage of the Great Seal of Scotland. Additionally, prior to any bill of the Scottish Parliament becoming formal law, the bill must be given royal assent by the monarch who signs a "letters patent" under the Great Seal of Scotland. Conservators from the National Records of Scotland assist in the preparation of all letters patent by the monarch used to formally sign bills of the Scottish Parliament, granting them to become official laws of Scotland. The Great Seal matrix, which was created at the Queen's accession, was used to cast a double-sided wax seal that was attached to official documents by a ribbon. Each seal is hand crafted by a conservator from the National Records of Scotland using traditional beeswax.

Unlike in the United Kingdom, the day after which a proposed bill is formally passed by members in the Scottish Parliament, letters are sent to the Law Officers of Scotland – the Lord Advocate, Solicitor General for Scotland and the Attorney General to formally notify them of the four week period they have to raise objections to the piece of proposed legislation. If neither of the law officers raise any objections, the Presiding Officer of the Scottish Parliament then sends the bill of the Scottish Parliament to the monarch at Buckingham Palace to formally seek approval from the monarch. The Presiding Officer also sends a warrant for Royal Sign Manual. Once the monarch receives the proposed bill from the Presiding Officer, the monarch returns the bill to the Scottish Parliament which is then sent to both the Registers of Scotland followed by the National Records of Scotland and instructs the first minister of Scotland to use the Great Seal of Scotland to formally sign "letters patent" of the proposed bill on the monarch's behalf.

Under the authority of an Order in Council made on 10 September 2022, following the death of Queen Elizabeth II, the existing seal continues to be used until another seal is prepared and authorised by King Charles III.

== List of Keepers of the Great Seal ==
Since 1999, the keeper of the Great Seal of Scotland has been the incumbent first minister of Scotland:

- Donald Dewar (1999–2000)
- Henry McLeish (2000–2001)
- Jack McConnell (2001–2007)
- Alex Salmond (2007–2014)
- Nicola Sturgeon (2014–2023)
- Humza Yousaf (2023–2024)
- John Swinney (2024–present)

== Register ==
Records of charters under the Great Seal of Scotland from 1306 to 1668 are published in the Register of the Great Seal of Scotland (Registrum Magni Sigilli Regum Scotorum).

== See also ==
- Director of Chancery
