= Accountant in Bankruptcy =

Agency overview
- Formed: 1985
- Type: Executive agency
- Jurisdiction: Scotland
- Headquarters: 1 Pennyburn Road, Kilwinning, KA13 6SA
- Employees: 121
- Minister responsible: Ivan McKee MSP, Minister for Public Finance of Scotland
- Agency executives: Richard Dennis, Accountant in Bankruptcy and Chief Executive; John Cook, Depute Accountant in Bankruptcy
- Parent department: Scottish Government
- Website: www.aib.gov.uk

Map
- Scotland in the UK and Europe

The Accountant in Bankruptcy (AiB) is the Scottish government agency responsible for administering the process of personal bankruptcy and corporate insolvency, administering the Debt Arrangement Scheme (DAS), and implementing, monitoring and reviewing government policy in these and related areas, for example protected trust deeds and diligence.

It is an executive agency of the Scottish Government. The Scottish Ministers are accountable to the Scottish Parliament for its functions and performance, and set the overall policy and resources framework without intervening in its day-to-day management. The agency is based in Pennyburn Road, Kilwinning, Ayrshire.

== See also ==
- Court of Session
- Diligence (Scots law)
- Reconstruction (law)
- Sequestration (law)
- Scheme of arrangement
- Institute of Chartered Accountants of Scotland
- Insolvency Practitioners Association
- Debtors (Scotland) Act 1838
