= Multiplepoinding =

Scots law action

In Scots law, multiplepoinding, (pronounced as if spelled multiple·pinnding) was a form of action by which conflicting claims to the same fund or property are determined.

The action is brought either by the holder or by a claimant in his name. All who have any claims in the fund or property in question are ordered to appear and give in their claims; the court then prefers them according to their respective rights, and the holder of the fund or property in dispute on payment or delivery is absolved from any further claim in regard to it. It corresponds to the process of interpleader in English law.

The property or money held by the pursuer in such an action is called the fund 'in medio', because it is, or may be, subject to the claims of all the claimants, and as yet belongs to none of them. It is thus common to them all, and forms the centre or substance of the litigation. (See Trayner's Latin Maxims, under "In Medio")

Multiplepoinding literally means double diligence. Poinding is in Scots law a diligence whereby a debtor's property is carried directly to a creditor. Poinding was abolished by the Abolition of Poindings and Warrant Sales Act 2001.
