= Commissary Court =

Term used in Scots law and in the Church of England

The term Commissary Court is in use in Scots law and in the Church of England.

== Scots law ==
At the Scottish Reformation in 1560, the system of consistorial courts where bishops exercised their civil jurisdiction over executry and matrimonial cases broke down. This led to such confusion that Commissary Courts were re-established between 1564 and 1566. The Commissary Court of Edinburgh was the principal court. This court had exclusive jurisdiction in marriage, divorce and bastardy, and a general jurisdiction in the same areas as the old courts. It also held local jurisdiction over the Lothians, Peebles and part of Stirlingshire. There was a limited right of appeal to the Court of Session. There were inferior Commissary Courts, with a jurisdiction based on that of the pre-Reformation episcopal diocese mainly in relation to testaments. They also had jurisdiction in actions of slander, the authentication of tutorial and curatorial inventories, actions for aliment and actions for debt up to a limit of £40 Scots.

The courts largely adopted the old canon law, except where this was contrary to the reformed religion.

In 1823 the inferior commissary courts powers were transferred to the sheriffs, although the Edinburgh court survived until 1836. The Commissary Court of Edinburgh was abolished in 1830 and its powers were transferred to the Court of Session (except for cases of aliment, which were transferred to the sheriff courts). All commissary courts were abolished in 1876 by the Sheriff Courts (Scotland) Act 1876 and their functions taken over by the sheriff courts. The office of commissary clerk of Edinburgh was retained, however, and the sheriff court of Edinburgh remained the proper forum for the confirmation of testaments of persons dying outside Scotland possessed of moveable estate there.

The papers of the Commissary Courts are held in the National Archives of Scotland.

== Church of England ==
The Commissary Court is the consistory court for the Diocese of Canterbury.

== Sources ==
- The Oxford Companion to Law, D.M. Walker, 1980
- National Archives of Scotland guide
