= Debtors (Scotland) Act 1838 =

Act of the Parliament of the United Kingdom

Debtors (Scotland) Act 1838 (Note: The citation of this act by this short title was authorised by section 1 of, and the first schedule to, the Short Titles Act 1896. Due to the repeal of those provisions it is now authorised by section 19(2) of the Interpretation Act 1978.)
- Act of Parliament
- Parliament of the United Kingdom
- Long title: An Act to amend the Law of Scotland in Matters relating to Personal Diligence, Arrestments, and Poindings.
- Citation: 1 & 2 Vict. c. 114
- Territorial extent: United Kingdom

Dates
- Royal assent: 16 August 1838
- Commencement: 31 December 1838 (Note: Section 1.)
Other legislation
Amended by	Statute Law Revision Act 1874 (No. 2); Sheriff Courts (Scotland) Act 1907; Administration of Justice (Scotland) Act 1933; Law Reform (Miscellaneous Provisions) (Scotland) Act 1940; Debtors (Scotland) Act 1987; Act of Sederunt (Rules of the Court of Session 1994) 1994; Bankruptcy and Diligence etc. (Scotland) Act 2007; Sheriff Courts (Scotland) Act 1971
Relates to	Debtors (Scotland) Act 1880

Status: Amended

Text of statute as originally enacted

Revised text of statute as amended

Text of the Debtors (Scotland) Act 1838 as in force today (including any amendments) within the United Kingdom, from legislation.gov.uk.

The Debtors (Scotland) Act 1838 (1 & 2 Vict. c. 114), also known as the Personal Diligence Act, is an act of the Parliament of the United Kingdom, signed into law on 16 August 1838. It amended the law of Scotland in matters relating to personal diligence – how the person or property of a debtor could be secured – arrestments and poindings (pronounced pindings). The effect was to simplify the form of proceedings and reduce their expense.

== Bibliography ==
- The British almanac of the Society for the Diffusion of Useful Knowledge, for the year 1839. The Society for the Diffusion of Useful Knowledge, London, 1839.
