= Scots succession law =

In Scots law there are different ways people can inherit when someone dies (succession law).

== Division of the estate ==
=== Debts ===
A person's debts (liabilities) are included in their estate, as well as their assets. When someone dies, their debts do not disappear. However, this does not mean that a person's family has to personally pay off their debts when they die. Instead, the debts are taken away from the amount that people can inherit.

=== Legal Rights ===
If the deceased had a spouse or civil partner, and/or children, that are still alive, they have legal rights in the estate. Legal rights are a claim for money, and they have these rights regardless of what is written in the will. For example, if someone writes in their will that they leave everything to charity, if they had a child, their child would still receive something. However, in Scotland, legal rights are only based on anything in the estate that is moveable property (anything which is not land or buildings). The spouse or civil partner’s right is to the value of 1/3 of the moveable estate if there are children, and ½ if there are no children. The children’s joint right is 1/3 if the deceased has a living spouse, and ½ if not. These rights exist no matter whether the deceased left a will or not.

If someone is put in the will to inherit something, they cannot also claim legal rights – they must choose one or the other. Therefore, it is common for people to renounce their legal rights, if they would receive more under the will.

=== Testate Succession ===
A will is a document that says what is to happen to a person’s estate when they die. People have capacity to make wills from the age of 12 in Scotland. Wills can be written by the person themselves, or by another person on their behalf. They must be paper documents, and they must be signed by the granter (the person whose will it is) at the end of the document.

If someone has left a will when they died, debts and taxes will be paid first, then legal rights may be claimed. After this, the legacies in the will are used to distribute the estate. A specific legacy identifies a particular piece of property, a general legacy identifies a certain amount of a type of thing, such as money. Residuary legacies state that someone is entitled to anything left over after all other claims on the estate have been dealt with. Universal legacies leave the entire estate to someone.

=== Intestate Succession ===
If someone dies without a will, their estate will be divided in a particular order, until it runs out.

The first stage is the prior rights. A surviving spouse can claim the deceased’s share of the house in which they ordinarily live in, up to the value of £473,000. If the value is less than this, the spouse can keep the house, but if it is more, the spouse gets £473k in cash. The surviving spouse is also entitled to £29,000 worth of the plenishings in that house. Next, the spouse can make a claim for money. If the deceased has children that are alive, the claim is £50,000, if there are no children, the claim is £89,000. If there is still moveable property left over after this, the spouse can claim 1/3 of it. If the deceased also had a cohabitant, or had a cohabitant but no spouse, the court can then make a discretionary award to them. Next the children can claim 1/3 of the moveable property.

Finally, if there is anything left, it falls into free estate. If there are children, they take all of this. If no children, it goes to the spouse. If no children or spouse, it goes to siblings or parents. If no relatives can be found, the estate falls to the crown.

== Who can Inherit ==
=== Children ===
Children are allowed to inherit no matter what age they are. Adopted children are treated as children of their adoptive parents and therefore have succession rights from them, although they lose any legal rights of succession from their natural parents.

=== Only the Living can Inherit ===
A common calamity is a tragic accident where multiple people die in the same event. Section 9(1) of the Succession (Scotland) Act 2016 provides that when this happens, and it is unclear who died first, each person is treated as having failed to survive the other, meaning neither can inherit from each other.

=== Unworthy Heir ===
There is a rule in common law called the ‘unworthy heir’ rule. This rule says that if you have unlawfully killed someone, you are not able to inherit from them. However, the Forfeiture Act 1982 s2 provides that the court can ‘modify’ this rule if it considers fair to do so. The court can only do this if the conviction was for culpable homicide rather than murder. (For the distinction between culpable homicide and murder - see Scots law on murder). For example, in the Paterson Petr case, a woman who had been subjected to brutal domestic violence, stabbed and killed the man when he attacked her, but was still allowed to inherit from his estate.
