= Divorce Act (Canada) =

Canadian federal law governing divorce

Parliament of Canada
- Long title: An Act respecting divorce and corollary relief
- Citation: R.S.C. 1985, c. 3 (2nd Supp.)
- Enacted by: Parliament of Canada
- Assented to: 13 February 1986
- Commenced: 1 June 1986

Related legislation
- First enacted: S.C. 1968-69, c. 24; Repealed and re-enacted: S.C. 1986, c. 4

Keywords
- Divorce; Canada
- Status: In force

The Divorce Act (French: Loi sur le divorce) is the federal Act that governs divorce in Canada. The Constitution of Canada gives the federal Parliament exclusive jurisdiction to regulate the law of marriage and divorce.

== History of divorce law in Canada ==
=== Pre-Confederation divorce laws ===
There was no uniform federal divorce law in Canada until 1968. Instead, there was a patch-work of divorce laws in the different provinces, depending on the laws in force in each province at the time it joined Confederation:

- In the three Maritime provinces, divorce was governed by laws enacted by the colonial governments prior to Confederation in 1867 (in Nova Scotia from 1758, in New Brunswick from 1791, and in Prince Edward Island from 1833);
- In the three prairie provinces and the northern territories, divorce was available under the English Matrimonial Causes Act 1857, which was incorporated into their local law in 1870 under the terms of the Rupert's Land Act 1868;
- In 1867, the Colony of British Columbia had declared that the laws of England, as they stood at November 19, 1858, were to apply "so far as they are not from local circumstances inapplicable". This declaration was later held to have included the English Matrimonial Causes Act 1857 as it stood at that time. Until 1937, there was no right of appeal from a divorce proceeding in British Columbia.
- In Quebec, the Civil Code of Lower Canada declared that "Marriage can only be dissolved by the natural death of one of the parties; while both live it is indissoluble."
- In Ontario, there was no pre-Confederation divorce law, although several efforts had been made prior to Confederation to bring it about.
- Newfoundland never enacted a divorce law prior to entering Confederation in 1949, and the local courts did not grant judicial separations until 1948. There was therefore no divorce law in Newfoundland after it joined Confederation.

=== Federal jurisdiction over divorce ===
With Confederation in 1867, the federal Parliament was given exclusive jurisdiction over the law of marriage and divorce. However, Parliament did not initially use this power to create a comprehensive divorce law, being content to make specific changes to the pre-Confederation law.

The English Matrimonial Causes Act 1857 provided that a husband could sue on grounds of adultery alone, but a wife would have to allege adultery together with other grounds. That rule applied in those provinces that had adopted the English Act. In 1925, Parliament provided that in those provinces, a wife could sue on grounds of adultery alone.

In 1930, Parliament extended relief to deserted wives, by providing that, in the provinces where divorce was available, they could pursue proceedings on the grounds of desertion, so long as there had been separation from the husband for at least two years.

It was not until 1930, when Parliament passed the Divorce Act (Ontario), that the courts of Ontario were given jurisdiction to grant divorces and annulments. The law granting divorce under this law was according to the law of England as it stood at July 15, 1870 (and thus on the same footing as the prairie provinces and the territories).

=== Parliamentary divorces ===
The only way for an individual to get divorced in the provinces where there was no divorce law—as well as in cases where the domicile of the parties was unclear—was to apply to the federal Parliament for a private bill of divorce. These bills were primarily handled by the Senate of Canada where a special committee would undertake an investigation of a request for a divorce. If the committee found that the request had merit, the marriage would be dissolved by an Act of Parliament.

In 1963, provision was made for the Senate of Canada to be able to dispose of parliamentary divorce petitions by way of resolution instead of by a private Act.

=== Foreign divorces ===
Residents of Ontario, Quebec and Newfoundland could attempt to obtain a divorce in the United States, but the validity of such decrees could be subject to review in the Canadian courts on the issue of domicile. In 1885, the Supreme Court of Canada ruled that a New York divorce was valid, even though the husband was living in Montreal, as "the burden was on the husband of showing that he had actually changed his domicile animo et de facto". The consequences where a divorce was not recognized (e.g., it was obtained in a divorce mill, such as Reno, Nevada once was) and where one of the parties had already remarried proved to be awkward in certain cases.

== Reform of the law ==
=== 1968 Act ===
In 1968, Parliament passed its first Divorce Act, which established a uniform divorce law across Canada. In addition to bringing about uniformity, the 1968 Act:

- placed both spouses on an equal footing in pursuing a divorce and specified that the grounds included:
  - adultery,
  - conviction of a sexual offence,
  - bigamy,
  - mental or physical cruelty, or
  - a permanent breakdown of the marriage, arising from a separation of three years' duration because of imprisonment of the other spouse, (Note: but only two years' separation was necessary in cases where the respondent was convicted of death or was imprisoned for a term of ten years or more, where all rights of appeal had been exhausted) addiction, disappearing in circumstances where it is not known where the spouse may have gone, inability or refusal to consummate a marriage, or living separate and apart during that time. (Note: but a petitioner who had deserted the other spouse had to wait five years before presenting such a petition) and
- declared that "the domicile of a married woman shall be determined as if she were unmarried, and, if she is a minor, as if she had attained her majority", with one year's residence in the province where the divorce order was sought, and provided that foreign divorces would be recognized as long as the foreign jurisdiction had similar rules with respect to the wife's domicile.
- provided that, where proceedings were initiated in separate provinces by each of the spouses, the one that commenced first would normally be the one that would be allowed to proceed. If both such proceedings were initiated on the same day, they would both be removed to the Divorce Division of the Exchequer Court.
- provided that judgment would be in the form of a decree nisi, which would only become absolute three months later, after the court was satisfied that all rights of appeal had been exhausted.

=== 1986 Act ===
In 1986, Parliament replaced the Act, which simplified the law of divorce further. It brought forth several significant changes:

- An application for divorce could be initiated by either spouse or both of them jointly.
- Breakdown of the marriage was specified as the sole ground for divorce, as evidenced by the spouses living separate and apart for the one year prior to the divorce proceedings (and being so at the date of their commencement), or by having committed adultery, or physical or mental cruelty, at any time since the celebration of the marriage.
- Domicile was no longer required, and a court had jurisdiction where one of the spouses had been resident in the province for at least one year prior to the commencement of the proceedings.
- The Divorce Division of the Exchequer Court became part of the Federal Court of Canada – Trial Division.
- The divorce became effective 31 days after the judgment granting it was rendered, provided that it is not under appeal.
- Foreign divorces are recognized for all purposes of determining the marital status of any person in Canada, provided that:
  - for those granted after July 1, 1968, they were granted in circumstances that conformed to the Canadian rules relating to domicile that existed at the time;
  - for those granted on or after the new Act came into force, they were granted in circumstances that conformed to the Canadian rules relating to residence immediately before the commencement of such proceedings; but
  - the rules of law relating to the recognition of divorces (otherwise than under the Act) remain in effect.

== Later amendments ==
=== Religious divorce (1990) ===
While divorce is a civil matter in Canadian law, lobbying from Jewish women's groups such as the Canadian Coalition of Jewish Women for the Gett served to highlight the problem of agunah in Canada, and the connected problem of obtaining a get in the Jewish rabbinical courts. The Act was amended in 1990 to provide that:

- a spouse (called the "deponent") may file an affidavit upon the other spouse identifying the particulars of the marriage, the nature of any barriers to remarriage in the deponent's religion that are within the other spouse's control, whether such barriers have been removed, or, where a request has been made to have such barriers removed, whether the other spouse has failed to remove them;
- the spouse served with the affidavit has 15 days to respond that such barriers have been removed to the court's satisfaction; and
- the court may dismiss an application by the other spouse, and strike out the other spouse's pleadings, where no response to the deponent's affidavit is received.

There are still certain complications arising from the application of this provision. In one Quebec case, the Supreme Court of Canada ruled that an agreement by divorcing parties, providing that the ex-husband would proceed forthwith to obtain a get, provided grounds for the ex-wife being able to obtain damages as a result of him reneging on it.

=== Same-sex marriage and divorce (2005) ===
During the period 2001–2005, same-sex marriage began to be available as a result a series of court cases in almost all provincial and territorial courts, which held that same-sex marriage was required by Section 15 of the Canadian Charter of Rights and Freedoms. In 2004, the Supreme Court of Canada held in the Reference re Same-Sex Marriage that such marriages were within the exclusive legislative authority of the Parliament of Canada, but declined to address the s.15 argument.

In 2005, Parliament passed the Civil Marriage Act, which made same-sex marriage the law throughout Canada, and also amended the Divorce Act to change its corresponding meaning of "spouse" to mean "either of two persons who are married to each other."

Later Canadian and foreign court proceedings revealed complications arising from the application of private international law, so that, while same-sex marriages solemnized in Canada may be legal when its jurisdiction, they must also be valid according to the rules of domicile that apply to the celebrants. As well, the Divorce Act's one-year residence requirement resulted in Canadian divorces not being able to be granted to spouses who are both non-resident. The CMA was amended in 2013 to provide for a separate divorce process to be available, outside the Divorce Act, to nonresident spouses in the province where the marriage took place, and such divorces have immediate effect.

=== Family violence, coercive control and divorce (2019) ===
In 2019, the federal Parliament amended the Divorce Act, to include coercive control. The new provision dealing with the best interests of the child requires the court to consider any family violence and its impact on the ability of the person who engaged in family violence to care for the child, and the appropriateness of an order requiring the parties to cooperate on the care of the child. In considering the impact of family violence, the court is to consider "whether there is a pattern of coercive and controlling behaviour in relation to a family member". The definition of "family violence" provides a non-exhaustive list of examples of coercive control, including forced confinement, harassment (including stalking), the failure to provide the necessities of life, psychological abuse, financial abuse, threats to kill or cause bodily harm to anyone, threats to harm or kill an animal or damage property, or actually doing so.

The implementation of these changes, the Department of Justice noted: “[...] while all violence is of concern, generally the most serious type of violence in family law is coercive and controlling violence. This is because it is part of an ongoing pattern, tends to be more dangerous and is more likely to affect parenting.”
