= National Collections of Scotland =

The five National Collections of Scotland are overseen and funded by the Scottish Government. The modern grouping developed as an administrative category for Scotland's principal national collecting institutions, rather than through the creation of a single organisation. They are responsible for collecting and publicly exhibiting items and archives of national and international importance.

== Collections ==
The National Collections are:

- National Library of Scotland, established by the National Library of Scotland Act 1925, largely upon the collections of the Advocates Library, which had been founded in 1689.
- National Museums Scotland, created in 1985 through the amalgamation of the Royal Scottish Museum, founded in 1854 as the Industrial Museum of Scotland, and the National Museum of Antiquities of Scotland.
- National Galleries of Scotland, opened in 1859, while the National Galleries of Scotland Act 1906 established a board responsible for the National Gallery and the Scottish National Portrait Gallery.
- National Records of Scotland
- Historic Environment Scotland.
Scotland's national collections
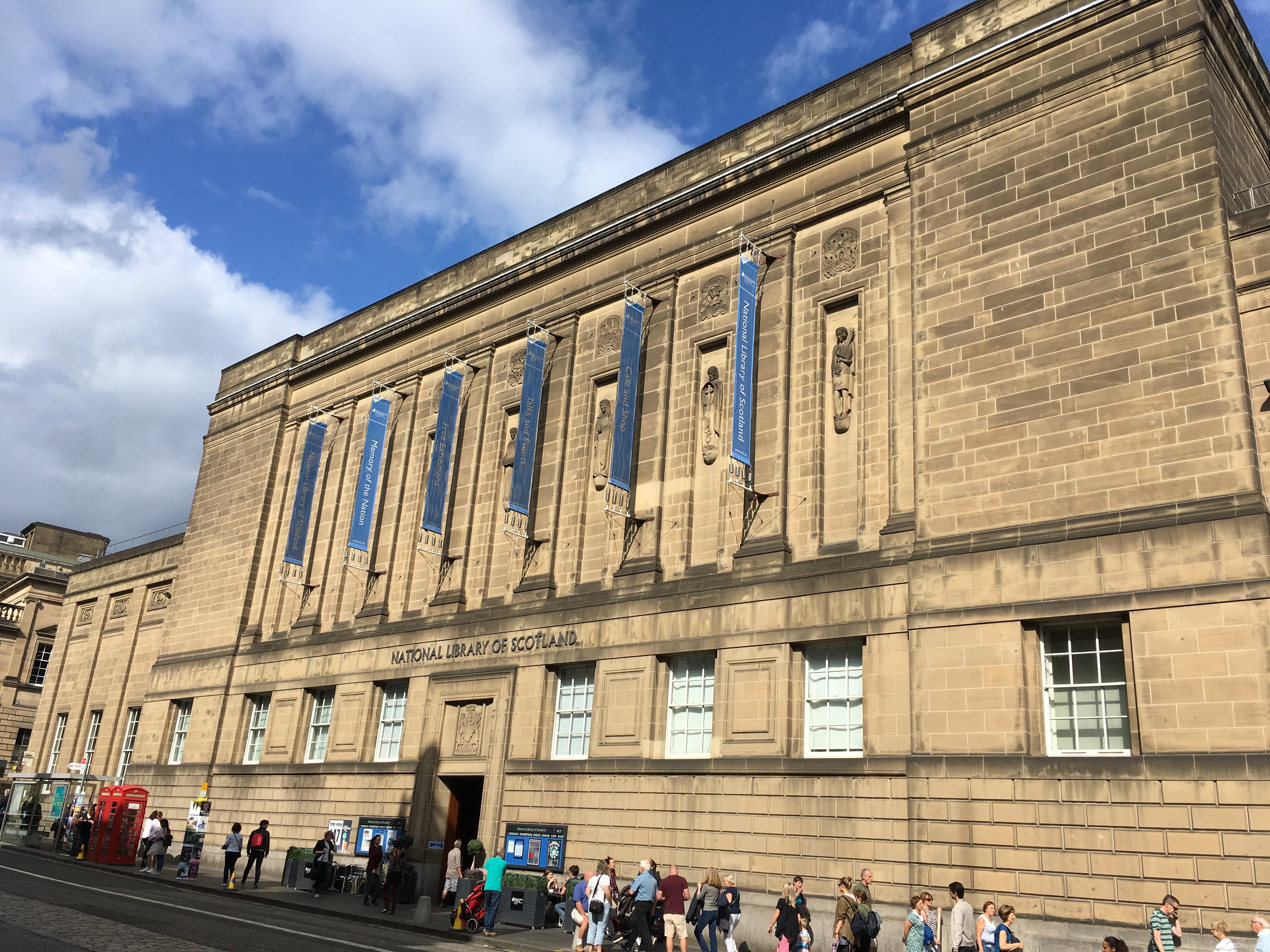
National Library of Scotland, George IV Bridge, Edinburgh

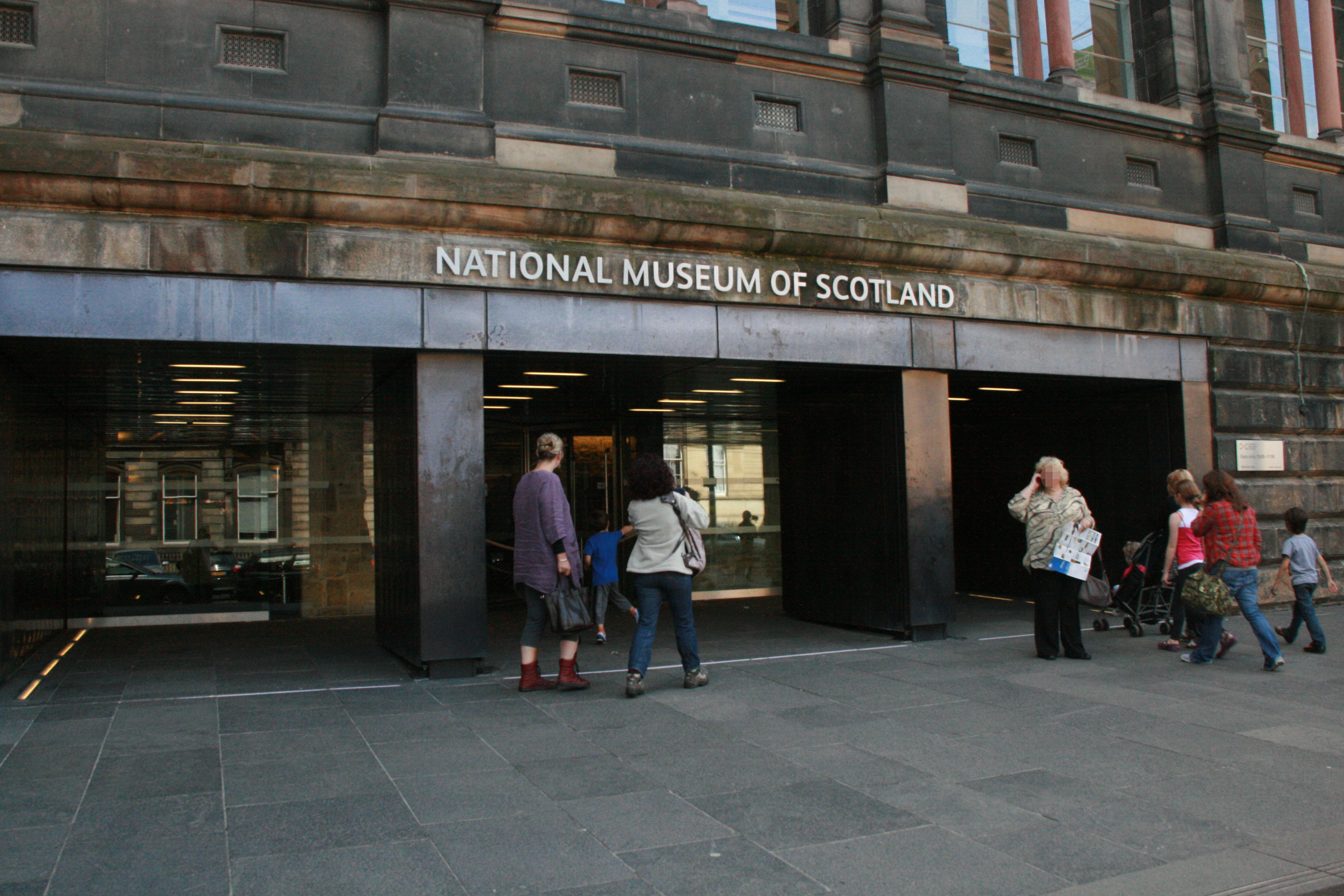
Main entrance of the National Museum of Scotland, Edinburgh

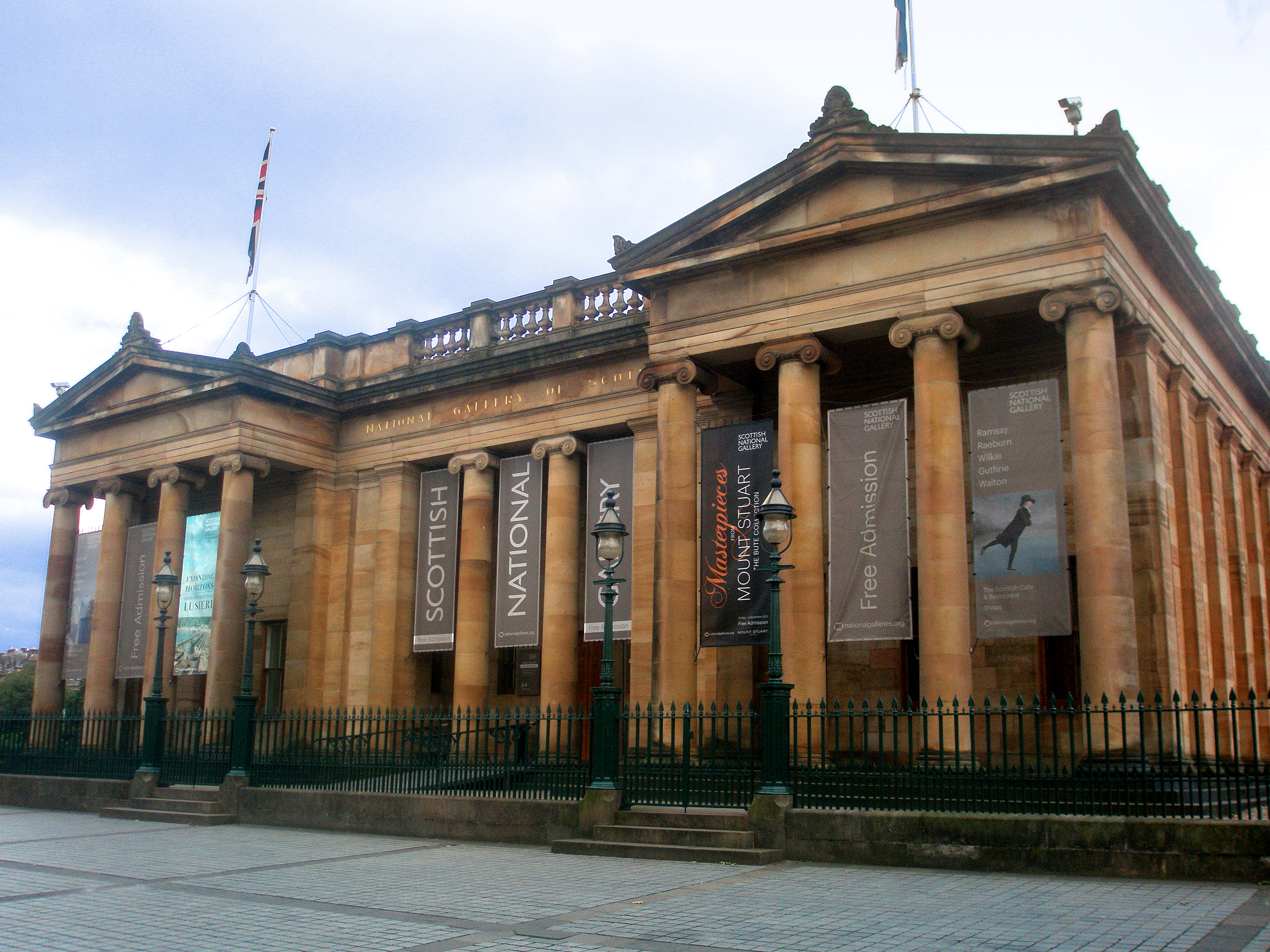
The Scottish National Gallery on the Mound, Edinburgh

Additionally, there are 51 Recognised Collections of National Significance, designated and supported by the Museums Galleries Scotland Recognition Scheme.

== Management ==
The individual collections are classified as executive non-departmental public bodies within Scotland's devolved public sector. They are governed at arm's length from the Scottish Government by separate Boards of Trustees appointed by the Scottish Ministers. The boards are responsible for institutional strategy, collection stewardship, financial control and oversight of senior management, while day-to-day operations are delegated to each organisation's chief executive and management team. Framework agreements between them and the Scottish Government define their accountability, reporting and financial-management arrangements and require compliance with the Scottish Public Finance Manual, while preserving the statutory responsibilities of their trustees.

== Funding ==
The National Collections receive their principal public funding directly from the Scottish Government through annual grant-in-aid allocations taht cover resource expenditure and, where applicable, capital projects. This support underpins the care, conservation, research and development of the collections and the policy of providing free public access to the principal collections. For the 2024–25 financial year, the Scottish Government's public-bodies directory recorded funding of £30.151 million for National Museums Scotland, £23.991 million for the National Galleries of Scotland and £22.170 million for the National Library of Scotland. The respective collections typically supplement government funding with commercial income, grants, donations, legacies and other fundraising.
