= Act of Sederunt =

Type of legislation made by the Court of Session in Scotland

An Act of Sederunt (/səˈdɛrənt/ sə-DERR-ənt; meaning a meeting or sitting of a court) is secondary legislation made by the Court of Session, the supreme civil court of Scotland, to regulate the proceedings of Scottish courts and tribunals hearing civil matters. Originally made under an Act of the Parliament of Scotland of 1532, the modern power to make Acts of Sederunt is largely derived from the Courts Reform (Scotland) Act 2014. Since 2013, draft Acts have also been prepared by the Scottish Civil Justice Council and submitted to the Court of Session for approval.

Following Scottish devolution and the establishment of the Scottish Parliament, Acts of Sederunt are made as Scottish statutory instruments. Previously, Acts were made as United Kingdom statutory instruments, and before that were a separate class of legislation.

== History ==
=== College of Justice Act 1532 ===
The Court of Session—more accurately the College of Justice—was established by the Parliament of Scotland under James V in 1532. The act of Parliament establishing the Court, later named the College of Justice Act 1532 (c. 2 (S)), provided that the Court would have "such... rules and statutes as shall please the king's grace to make and give to them" and "ordain[ed] the same to have effect in all points and [that the] processes, sentences and decreets shall have the same strength, force and effect as the decreets of the lords of session had in all times bygone." That is, that the rules of the Court of Session were to be made by the King and to have the same force as the decrees of the Lords of Session had before.

=== College of Justice Act 1540 ===
College of Justice Act 1540
- Act of Parliament
- Parliament of Scotland
- Long title: Ratificatioune of the Institutioune of the college of iustice.
- Citation: March 1540 c. 10 [12mo ed: 1540 c. 93]

Dates
- Royal assent: 14 March 1541

Text of the College of Justice Act 1540 as in force today (including any amendments) within the United Kingdom, from legislation.gov.uk.

Although established in 1532, it was not until the passing of the College of Justice Act 1540 (March c. 10 (S)), also known as the Act of Sederunt 1540 (originally titled Ratification of the institution of the college of justice) that the Court of Session gained the power to make law through Acts of Sederunt. The act granted the Lord President, the vice-president, and the Senators of the College of Justice the "power to make such acts, statutes and ordinance as they shall think expedient for ordering of processes and the hasty expedition of justice."

=== Courts Act 1672 ===
The Courts Act 1672 (originally Act concerning the regulation of the judicatories) created the High Court of Justiciary, the supreme criminal court of Scotland, by attaching five of the Lords of Session to the Lord Justice General and Lord Justice Clerk. The Courts Act also provided that "the judges of that court ... regulate the inferior officers thereof, and order every other thing concerning the said court", and so created the distinction between Acts of Sederunt and Acts of Adjournal which continues to exist to this day.

Following a 19th-century reforming of the High Court of Justiciary, all Lords of Session were ex officio Lords Commissioners of Justiciary, instead of the original five ordained by the Courts Act. Although that reformation was repealed, its effect was replicated by the Criminal Procedure (Scotland) Act 1995, which provided that the Lord President of the Court of Session was also to hold the office of Lord Justice General.

=== Administration of Justice (Scotland) Act 1933 ===
The powers of the Court of Session to make Acts of Sederunt were partially consolidated by the Administration of Justice (Scotland) Act 1933, which also made significant changes to the structure and operations of the Court. One of these significant changes was the establishing of a Rules Council, composed of the Lord President as well as Court of Session judges and practising lawyers, to propose Acts of Sederunt to the Court. The Act also created a Sheriff Court Rules Council, to carry out the same functions but in relation to the sheriff courts.

=== Sheriff Courts (Scotland) Act 1971 ===
The Sheriff Courts (Scotland) Act 1971 enabled the Court of Session to regulate the sheriff courts and Sheriff Appeal Court when they heard civil matters. The Act also dissolved the Sheriff Court Rules Council created by the Administration of Justice (Scotland) Act 1933, and created a new Sheriff Court Rules Council to continually review sheriff court procedure and submit to the Court of Session draft Acts of Sederunt for regulating sheriff courts.

=== Court of Session Act 1988 ===
The Court of Session Act 1988 was another consolidating act, now with sections relating to Acts of Sederunt largely repealed or modified by the Courts Reform (Scotland) Act 2014, that also altered the structure of the Court of Session. The remaining powers to make Acts of Sederunt relate to summary trials—although the actual power is now derived from the Courts Reform (Scotland) Act 2014—and the considering of applications to appeal to the Inner House by a single judge.

=== Scottish Civil Justice Council and Criminal Legal Assistance Act 2013 ===
The Court of Session Rules Council and Sheriff Court Rules Council were dissolved by the Scottish Civil Justice Council and Criminal Legal Assistance Act 2013, which established the Scottish Civil Justice Council as their replacement. Originally, the council's only function in relation to Acts of Sederunt was to prepare draft civil procedure rules for the Court of Session and sheriff courts, but this was expanded by the Courts Reform (Scotland) Act 2014 to include preparing draft procedural rules for the Sheriff Appeal Court and draft fees rules, and by the Inquiries into Fatal Accidents and Sudden Deaths etc. (Scotland) Act 2016 to include draft inquiry procedure rules.

=== Courts Reform (Scotland) Act 2014 ===
The majority of the Court of Session's current power to regulate is derived from the Courts Reform (Scotland) Act 2014, which consolidated many of the existing powers and, in conjunction with the Tribunals (Scotland) Act 2014, extended the power of the Court of Session to enable the Court to make rules for tribunals.

=== Inquiries into Fatal Accidents and Sudden Deaths etc. (Scotland) Act 2016 ===
The Court of Session's power to create Acts of Sederunt was extended by the Inquiries into Fatal Accidents and Sudden Deaths etc. (Scotland) Act 2016 to include the power to regulate the practice and procedure of public inquiries and fatal accident inquiries.

== Powers ==
As with other secondary legislation, an Act of Sederunt can only make law within the scope set out by an enabling act—an item of primary legislation from which power to make secondary legislation is derived. Most powers of the Court of Session were consolidated into the Courts Reform (Scotland) Act 2014, but other powers continue to be provided by the Public Records (Scotland) Act 1937, the Court of Session Act 1988, the Judiciary and Courts (Scotland) Act 2008, the Legal Services (Scotland) Act 2010, the Tribunals (Scotland) Act 2014, the Inquiries into Fatal Accidents and Sudden Deaths etc. (Scotland) Act 2016, and others.

A non-exhaustive summary of these powers is provided below. In exercising these powers, the Court of Session can amend or repeal any enactment, including primary legislation, if it relates to matters an Act of Sederunt may cover.

- Regulation of times and conditions of transmitting records to the Court of Session and Sheriff Appeal Court.
- Setting of fees for inspection and copying of records held by the Keeper of the Records of Scotland.
- Regulation of procedure for tribunals considering fitness for the offices of Lord President, Lord Justice Clerk, judge of the Court of Session, Chairman of the Scottish Land Court, temporary judge, justices of the peace, sheriff principal, sheriff, and summary sheriff.
- Regulation of consideration by a single judge of appeals to the Inner House.
- Making of rules for admission into the Faculty of Advocates.
- Regulation of determination of the value of orders for payment of money or orders on property rights.
- Regulation of simple procedure claims, including calculation of value of claims.
- Regulation of representation of non-natural legal persons by laypersons.
- General regulation of procedure in practice in the Court of Session, sheriff courts, Sheriff Appeal Court.
- Setting of fees for the Court of Session, sheriff courts, and Sheriff Appeal Court.
- Making of rules for the First-tier and Upper Tribunal for Scotland.
- Regulation of procedure for tribunals considering fitness for membership of the First-tier or Upper Tribunals.
- Regulation of procedure for inquiries into fatal accidents and sudden deaths.

Note, however, that the power to regulate admission into the Faculty of Advocates is effectively delegated from the Court of Session to the Faculty, as the Court legislated to require that those seeking admission meet criteria set out by the Faculty.

== Court procedure ==
=== Rules of the Court of Session ===
Rules for the functioning of the Court of Session are developed by the Scottish Civil Justice Council, which was established by the Scottish Civil Justice Council and Criminal Legal Assistance Act 2013. The Council prepares draft rules of procedure for the civil courts and advises the Lord President on the development of the civil justice system in Scotland. The SCJC will consider changes to practice and procedure in response to policy initiatives, by specific request, or of its own accord.

Membership of the council is provided for in the 2013 Act. The council is chaired by the Lord President, Lord Carloway, and membership includes:

- The Chief Executive of the Scottish Courts and Tribunals Service (Eric McQueen)
- The Chief Executive of the Scottish Legal Aid Board (Lindsay Montgomery CBE)
- One member of Scottish Government staff (Jan Marshall)
- At least four members of the judiciary, including at least one judge of the Court of Session and at least one sheriff principal or sheriff (Rt. Hon. Lord Menzies, Rt. Hon Lord Tyre, Sheriff Principal Mhairi M. Stephen and Sheriff Ian R Abercrombie QC)
- At least two practicing advocates (James Wolffe QC and Sarah Wolffe QC)
- At least two practicing solicitors (Eric Baijal and Duncan Murray)
- At least two consumer representative members (Ian Maxwell, Families Need Fathers and Lauren Wood, Citizens Advice Scotland)
- Up to six LP members (Employment Judge Joseph d'Inverno and Professor Fances Wasoff, University of Edinburgh).

=== Sheriff court rules ===
Rules for the functioning of civil procedure in the sheriff courts are also prepared by the Scottish Civil Justice Council.

== Enacting formulae ==
Acts of Sederunt, like other legislation in the United Kingdom, are introduced by enacting formulae. Those for the regulation of procedure in the Court of Session begin:

The Lords of Council and Session, under and by virtue of the powers conferred on them by section 5 of the Court of Session Act 1988 and of all other powers enabling them in that behalf, do hereby enact and declare:

Those for the regulation of procedure in the sheriff courts begin:

The Lords of Council and Session, under and by virtue of the powers conferred by section 32 of the Sheriff Courts (Scotland) Act 1971 and of all other powers enabling them in that behalf, having approved draft rules submitted to them by the Sheriff Court Rules Council in accordance with section 34 of the Sheriff Courts (Scotland) Act 1971, do hereby enact and declare:

Those for setting the fees of messengers-at-arms are enacted:

The Lords of Council and Session, under and by virtue of the powers conferred upon them by section 6 of the Execution of Diligence (Scotland) Act 1926, section 5 of the Court of Session Act 1988 and of all other powers enabling them in that behalf, with the concurrence of the Lord Lyon King of Arms do hereby enact and declare:

Those for setting the fees of sheriff officers are enacted:

The Lords of Council and Session, under and by virtue of the powers conferred upon them by section 40 of the Sheriff Courts (Scotland) Act 1907, section 6 of the Execution of Diligence (Scotland) Act 1926 and of all other powers enabling them in that behalf, do hereby enact and declare:
