= Aliment =

Concept in civil systems

Aliment, in Scots law and in other civil systems, is the sum of money paid, or allowance given in respect of the reciprocal obligation of parents and children, husband and wife, grandparents and grandchildren, to contribute to each other's maintenance.

The term aliment is also used in regards to a similar obligation of other parties, as of creditors to imprisoned debtors, the payments by parishes to paupers, etc.

Alimentary funds, whether of the kind above mentioned, or set apart as such by the deed of a testator, are intended for the mere support of the recipient, and are not attachable by creditors.

== See also ==
- Alimony
- Child support
- Commissary Court
- Court of Session
- Filial responsibility laws
