= Filial responsibility laws =

Criminalization of not financially supporting one's impoverished parents or relatives

Filial responsibility laws (filial support laws, filial piety laws) impose a duty, usually upon adult children, for elderly care of their parents or other relatives. Such laws may be enforced by governmental or private entities and may be at the state or national level. While most filial responsibility laws contemplate civil enforcement, some include criminal penalties for adult children or close relatives who fail to provide for family members when challenged to do so. The key concept is impoverished, as there is no requirement that the parent be aged. For some societies, filial piety has been applied to family responsibilities toward elders.

Typically, these laws obligate adult children (or depending on the state, other family members) to pay for their indigent parents'/relatives' food, clothing, shelter and medical needs. Should the children fail to provide adequately, they allow nursing homes and government agencies to bring legal action to recover the cost of caring for the parents. Adult children can even go to jail in some states if they fail to provide filial support.

== By region ==
=== United States ===
Filial support laws were an outgrowth of the Elizabethan Poor Relief Act 1601. As of 2019, twenty-six states plus Puerto Rico have filial responsibility laws on the books: Alaska, Arkansas (Note: Arkansas law can only require payment for adult mental care.), California, Connecticut (Note: Connecticut law only applies if the parents are younger than 65.), Delaware, Georgia, Indiana, Kentucky, Louisiana, Massachusetts, Mississippi, Nevada (Note: Nevada law only mandates filial liability only if there is a written agreement to pay for care.), New Hampshire, New Jersey, North Carolina, North Dakota, Ohio, Oregon, Pennsylvania, Puerto Rico, Rhode Island, South Dakota, Tennessee, Utah, Vermont, Virginia, West Virginia. Generally, the media has not covered filial responsibility laws much. Some states repealed their filial support laws after Medicaid took a greater role in providing relief to elderly patients without means. Iowa repealed its filial responsibility law in 2015.

A "filial responsibility law" is not the same thing as the provision in United States federal law which requires a "lookback" of five years in the financial records of anyone applying for Medicaid to ensure that the person did not give away assets in order to qualify for Medicaid.

In 2012, the media reported the case of John Pittas, whose mother had received care in a skilled nursing facility in Pennsylvania after an accident and then moved to Greece. The nursing home sued her son directly, before even trying to collect from Medicaid. A court in Pennsylvania ruled that the son must pay, according to the Pennsylvania filial responsibility law. Other notable cases that enforced filial responsibility laws are in North Dakota and South Dakota.

=== Canada ===
Unlike the United States where filial responsibility laws were based on English poor laws, filial responsibility laws were enacted by the Canadian provinces in response to the harsh economic conditions of the Great Depression. Despite the official passage of these laws, very few parents sought the enforcement of these laws by the courts, with one study finding only 58 reported cases in the years between 1933 and 1963.

In the 1980s and 1990s, most provinces included the old filial responsibility laws in their reformed family laws.

Alberta dropped their filial responsibility law in 2005 and British Columbia repealed theirs in 2011.

=== Germany ===
In Germany, people who are related in a "direct line" (grandparents, parents, children, grandchildren) are required to support each other, this includes children with impoverished parents (de:Elternunterhalt, support to parents).

=== France ===
In France, close relatives (such as children, parents and spouses) are required to support each other in case of need (fr:obligation alimentaire, duty to support).

=== Asia ===
Singapore, Taiwan, India, and Mainland China criminalize refusal of financial or emotional support for one's elderly parents.

==== Philippines ====
Under the Family Code of the Philippines, Article 195 insists that members of a family unit must support one another.

Senator Panfilo Lacson has repeatedly proposed the passage of a filial responsibility law. The latest iteration is the Parents Welfare Act of 2025 which will penalize children who abandon or fail to provide adequate care to their elderly, ill, and incapacitated parents.

Under the proposed measure, a court may dismiss a petition or reduce the amount of support if, after due notice and hearing, it determines that the parent had previously abandoned, abused, or neglected the child. Financially incapable children are not obliged to provide support as well.

== See also ==
- Aliment, in Scotland
- Filiation
- Gerontocracy
- Legitimacy (family law)
- Legitime
