= National Records of Scotland =

Non-ministerial department of the Scottish Government

- Scottish Gaelic: Clàran Nàiseanta na h-Alba

Non-ministerial government department overview
- Formed: 1 April 2011
- Preceding agencies: National Archives of Scotland; General Register Office for Scotland
- Jurisdiction: Scotland
- Headquarters: HM General Register House, 2 Princes Street, Edinburgh EH1 3YY
- Employees: 430
- Minister responsible: Hannah Mary Goodlad, Minister for Public Finance
- Non-ministerial government department executive: Alison Byrne, Keeper of the Records / Registrar General
- Website: nrscotland.gov.uk

National Records of Scotland (Scottish Gaelic: Clàran Nàiseanta na h-Alba) is a non-ministerial department of the Scottish Government. It is responsible for civil registration, the census in Scotland, demography and statistics, family history, as well as the national archives and historical records.

National Records of Scotland was formed from the merger of the General Register Office for Scotland and the National Archives of Scotland in 2011; it combines all the functions of the two former organisations. The offices of Registrar General for Scotland and Keeper of the Records of Scotland remain separate, but since 2011 both have been vested ex officio in the Chief Executive of National Records of Scotland, currently Paul Lowe.

== Location ==
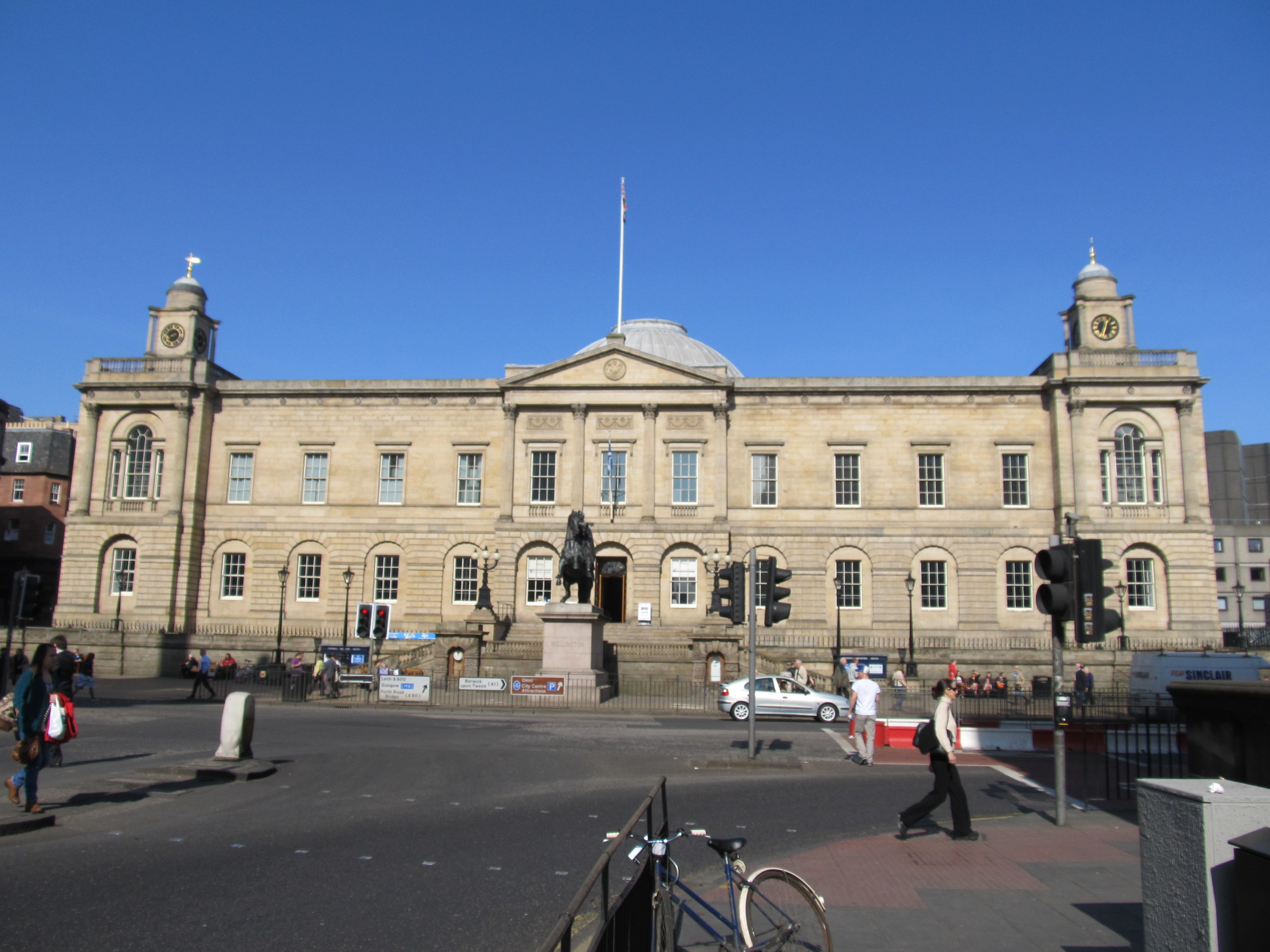
View of Register House from North Bridge, looking across Princes Street

National Records of Scotland is based in HM General Register House on Princes Street in the New Town in Edinburgh. The building was designed by Robert Adam for the Register House Trustees; it was opened to the public in 1788.

== History ==
The first official tasked with the care and administration of the public records was first recorded in the role of Clericus Rotulorum (Clerk of the Rolls) in the Kingdom of Scotland in 1286. Registers, rolls and records were kept in Edinburgh Castle from about the 13th century. The role of the Clerk of the Rolls eventually became known as the Lord Clerk Register, the oldest surviving great offices of state in Scotland. However, records held by the Scottish Crown did not typically include personal data such as birth, death and marriage records. Instead, the clergy and other officials of the Church of Scotland kept parish records, which recorded personal data such as baptisms and marriages, but only for their own church members so parish records were limited in scope. In 1551, a council of Scottish clergy enacted that all parish ministers should keep a record of baptisms, burials and marriages. However, in 1801, the first national Census found that, out of the 850 parishes in Scotland, not more than 99 had regular registers. This was in part due to sporadic recording keeping and accidental destruction of registers.

In 1806, a Royal Warrant established the office of Deputy Clerk Register, effectively reducing the record keeping duties of the Lord Clerk Register to an honorary title with no day-to-day management of the Registers and Records of Scotland. However, personal data continued to be managed by the clergy, now largely ministers of the Church of Scotland. The Industrial revolution radically changed the population demographics of Scotland, with central belt parishes being swamped by migrants from the Highlands and Lowlands which also contributed to the poor record keeping in registers. A bill came before the United Kingdom Parliament in 1829 and several others in subsequent years to introduce a system of state registration, following the similar introduction of public registration in England & Wales in 1837, but the bills were unsuccessful. One of the main reasons they were unsuccessful was the opposition, including the Church of Scotland, to attempts in the bills to reform the Scots laws of marriage, which had historically been very informal as The Scotsman newspaper describes:

Everybody knows that, by the law of Scotland, the marriage ceremony can be performed with as perfect legal effect by a blacksmith as by a clergyman.

However, the proposals for reform were dropped and in 1854, the Deputy Clerk Register's duties were also extended to the care of the records of births, deaths and marriages in the role of Registrar General under the Registration of Births, Deaths and Marriages (Scotland) Act 1854, which established the General Registry Office of Births, Deaths and Marriages. The 1854 Act also provided that the Registrar General should produce an annual report to be forwarded to the Home Secretary to be laid before Parliament, containing a general abstract of the numbers of births, deaths and marriages registered during the previous year. The first general abstract (relating to 1855) was submitted in 1856. By the time of his first annual detailed report, published in 1861, the first Registrar General for Scotland, William Pitt Dundas, claimed that: "there is good reason for believing that very few births indeed now escape registration."

In 1855 and 1860, two further Acts, the Registration (Scotland) Act, 1855 (18 & 19 Vict., c.29) and the Registration (Scotland, Amendment) Act, 1860 (23 & 24 Vict., c.85), were passed which amended some of the sections of the 1854 Act. The 1854 Act had placed considerable burdens on the sheriffs of the Scottish counties, who had already played a role in the taking of decennial censuses. The amending Acts reduced their responsibilities by appointing registration district examiners to inspect the registers. They also made revised provision for the transmission of the parochial registers up to the year 1820 to the General Register Office Scotland (GROS), and the registers for the years 1820–1855 to the custody of the local registrars. These registers were to be retained by the local registrars for 30 years, after which they were to be sent to the GROS.

In 1879, The Lord Clerk Register (Scotland) Act 1879 further provided that the office of Lord Clerk Register would remain as a ceremonial Great Officer of State, with all record keeping duties passing to the Deputy Clerk Register. In 1909 by Sir James Patten McDougall was appointed as Deputy Clerk Register, the last holder of the combined offices of Registrar General and Deputy Lord Clerk Register. The Registrar General (Scotland) Act 1920 provided for the appointment by the Secretary of State for Scotland of a full-time Registrar General, separate from the Deputy Clerk Register. The recording of personal data was in effect severed from the Deputy Clerk Register, who continued to maintain the records and registers of Scotland. James Crawford Dunlop, who had served as medical superintendent of statistics since 1904, held the office of Registrar General from 1921 to 1930. The 12 subsequent Registrars General were drawn from the civil service in Scotland and headed the General Register Office for Scotland independently from the Deputy Clerk Register.

In 1928, the office of Deputy Clerk Register itself was abolished by the Reorganisation of Offices (Scotland) Act 1928, becoming the Keeper of the Registers and Records of Scotland. However, it came to be recognised that the keeping of records and the keeping of registers was too cumbersome a task to be entrusted to a single department. In 1948, the Public Registers and Records (Scotland) Act 1948 provided that the Registers of Scotland and Records of Scotland were to be split into two separate government organisations with two separate officials: (1) the Keeper of the Registers of Scotland and (2) the Keeper of the Records of Scotland. The Keeper of the Registers of Scotland was given the duties to maintain and preserve the General Register of Sasines, the Register of Hornings, the Register of Inhibitions and Adjudications, the Register of Deeds and other chancery and judicial registers. The Keeper of the Records of Scotland, was given the duties to preserve the public registers, records and rolls of Scotland.

From 1949, the Keeper of the Registers headed the Department of the Registers of Scotland. The Keeper of the Records of Scotland headed the Records Office, later called the National Archives of Scotland. This left three departments and their respective officials managed the following:

- Personal Data: The Registrar General and the General Register Office for Scotland.
- Records: The Keeper of the Records of Scotland and the Records Office, later the National Archives of Scotland.
- Registers: The Keeper of the Registers of Scotland and Registers of Scotland.

=== The Archivists’ Garden ===
In 2010, the Archivists’ Garden was opened at General Register House. It contains 59 plant species which are all connected in some way with Scotland's "collective memory", including through myth and folklore, heraldry or association with famous Scots. The garden is open to the public during the house's normal opening hours.

=== 2011 merger ===
The current body (NRS) was created on 1 April 2011 by the merger of the General Register Office for Scotland and National Archives of Scotland and is a Non-ministerial office of the Scottish Government. NRS is one of the National Collections of Scotland and falls with the ministerial portfolio of the Cabinet Secretary for Economy, Fair Work and Culture. The Registers of Scotland remain a separate organisation and fall within the ministerial portfolio of the Cabinet Secretary for Finance.

== Services and collections ==
NRS supports research in a number of ways, through guides, websites and training. The ScotlandsPeople website, the official Scottish Government site for searching government records and archives, is maintained by NRS in partnership with the Court of the Lord Lyon. NRS provides training in palaeography, the study of historical writing such as secretary hand, which is necessary to read some of its records; it maintains training material on its Scottish Handwriting site.

The NRS collects and publishes Scottish statistics and data relating to registers, notably deaths involving coronavirus (COVID-19) in Scotland, the source for data provided on the Scottish Government's COVID-19 dashboard. It also publishes statistics about first names given to babies in Scotland since 1998.

NRS maintains the Scottish Register of Tartans.

It aims to be a leader in archival practice and acts a source of guidance to records managers and archivists in Scotland.

The NRS Web Continuity Service launched on 20 November 2017. A web archive of sites belonging to organisations who deposit records with NRS, the service ensures that previous versions of pages and files can be accessed, while being clearly distinguishable from live content.

== See also ==
- Office for National Statistics
- UK Statistics Authority
- Northern Ireland Statistics and Research Agency
