= Sheriff officer =

A sheriff officer is an officer of the Scottish sheriff court, responsible for serving documents and enforcing court orders. Messengers-at-arms and sheriff officers are employed by private businesses and charge fees that are set by Act of Sederunt.

The jurisdiction of a sheriff officer is limited to the area of their commission (the relevant sheriffdom or Sheriff Court district), unlike messengers-at-arms (the equivalent officers of the Court of Session, who have jurisdiction throughout Scotland).

Sheriff officers have been under the control of the local Sheriff for centuries. The office of sheriff officer is thought to be one of the oldest in the Scottish legal system, and may derive from the pre-feudal office of mair (an official who attended a sheriff for arrestment or executions).

Section 60 of the Bankruptcy and Diligence etc. (Scotland) Act 2007 would have abolished the offices of messenger-at-arms and sheriff officer and replaced them by a new office of "judicial officer". Judicial officers would have held a commission from the Lord President of the Court of Session under section 57 of the Act, granted on the recommendation of a Scottish Civil Enforcement Commission. However, on 30 January 2008 the Scottish Government announced as part of a package of public service reform that the Scottish Civil Enforcement Commission would not be established and that its functions would be discharged by existing organisations. The provisions of the 2007 Act were not brought into force, and are to be repealed by the Public Services Reform (Scotland) Act 2010.

In November 2010, the Scottish Government issued a consultation on the designation of a professional organisation for officers of court.
