= Poinding =

Process of conveying a debtor's property to a creditor in Scots law

In Scots law, poinding (/ˈpɪndɪŋ/) is that diligence whereby a debtor's property is carried directly to a creditor. This type of diligence has now been abolished after the enactment of the Abolition of Poindings and Warrant Sales Act 2001.

There were two types of poinding:

- Personal – The taking of movable property (e.g., wagons, livestock; but not property such as a house because it is not movable) belonging to the debtor. Plough cattle and tillage instruments cannot be included in times of labour or tilling, unless the debtor has no other movable property to satisfy the debt. Personal poinding is founded merely on an obligation to pay, all else aside. A relatively low level of diligence is sufficient to accomplish this (such as letters of horning, or a warrant granted by a sheriff or commissary).
- Real – The confiscation of non-movable property (such as land) and the movable property found on it. Every debitum fundi (a debt using land as collateral) is a foundation for real poinding. It cannot be used against movable property brought onto the land by a stranger, nor against the movable property of a tenant for more than the value of the tenant's term rent. A relatively high level of diligence is necessary to accomplish this.

== See also ==
- Multiplepoinding
