= Messenger-at-arms =

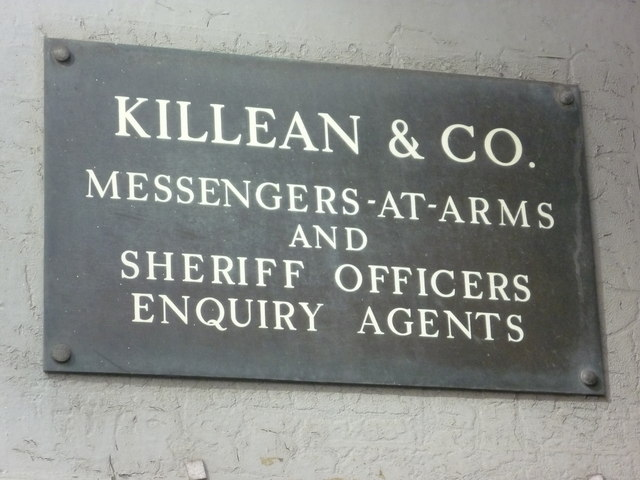
Legal firm's nameplate, Dundee, Scotland

A messenger-at-arms is an officer of the Scottish Court of Session, responsible for serving documents and enforcing court orders throughout Scotland. Messengers-at-arms must have a commission as a sheriff officer although, unlike sheriff officers, the jurisdiction of a messenger-at-arms is not limited to the area for which they have a commission. Both messengers-at-arms and sheriff officers are employed by private businesses and charge fees that are set by Act of Sederunt.

Originally known as an "Officer of the King", the office of messenger-at-arms dates back several hundred years. Messengers-at-arms have been under the control of the Lord Lyon King of Arms since at least 1510, and are still appointed by Lord Lyon, although now on the recommendation of the Court of Session, to execute summonses and letters of diligence connected with the Court of Session and High Court of Justiciary.

Section 60 of the Bankruptcy and Diligence etc. (Scotland) Act 2007 would have abolished the offices of messenger-at-arms and sheriff officer and replaced them by a new office of "judicial officer". Judicial officers would have held a commission from the Lord President of the Court of Session under section 57 of the Act, granted on the recommendation of a Scottish Civil Enforcement Commission. However, on 30 January 2008 the Scottish government announced as part of a package of public service reform that the Scottish Civil Enforcement Commission would not be established and that its functions would be discharged by existing organisations. The provisions of the 2007 Act were not brought into force, and are to be repealed by the Public Services Reform (Scotland) Act 2010.

In November 2010, the Scottish government issued a consultation on the designation of a professional organisation for officers of court.

== See also ==
- Letters of horning
