= List of acts of the Parliament of the United Kingdom from 1906 =

This is a complete list of acts of the Parliament of the United Kingdom for the year 1906.

Note that the first parliament of the United Kingdom was held in 1801; parliaments between 1707 and 1800 were either parliaments of Great Britain or of Ireland). For acts passed up until 1707, see the list of acts of the Parliament of England and the list of acts of the Parliament of Scotland. For acts passed from 1707 to 1800, see the list of acts of the Parliament of Great Britain. See also the list of acts of the Parliament of Ireland.

For acts of the devolved parliaments and assemblies in the United Kingdom, see the list of acts of the Scottish Parliament, the list of acts of the Northern Ireland Assembly, and the list of acts and measures of Senedd Cymru; see also the list of acts of the Parliament of Northern Ireland.

The number shown after each act's title is its chapter number. Acts passed before 1963 are cited using this number, preceded by the year(s) of the reign during which the relevant parliamentary session was held; thus the Union with Ireland Act 1800 is cited as "39 & 40 Geo. 3 c. 67", meaning the 67th act passed during the session that started in the 39th year of the reign of George III and which finished in the 40th year of that reign. Note that the modern convention is to use Arabic numerals in citations (thus "41 Geo. 3" rather than "41 Geo. III"). Acts of the last session of the Parliament of Great Britain and the first session of the Parliament of the United Kingdom are both cited as "41 Geo. 3". Acts passed from 1963 onwards are simply cited by calendar year and chapter number.

== 6 Edw. 7 ==
The first session of the 28th Parliament of the United Kingdom, which met from 13 February 1906 until 21 December 1906.

This session was also traditionally cited as 6 Ed. 7 or 6 E. 7.

=== Public general acts ===
Short title	Citation	Royal assent
Long title
Consolidated Fund (No. 1) Act 1906 (repealed)	6 Edw. 7. c. 1	30 March 1906
An Act to apply certain sums out of the Consolidated Fund to the service of the years ending on the thirty- first day of March one thousand nine hundred and six and one thousand nine hundred and seven. (Repealed by Statute Law Revision Act 1927 (17 & 18 Geo. 5. c. 42))
Army (Annual) Act 1906 (repealed)	6 Edw. 7. c. 2	30 March 1906
An Act to provide, during Twelve Months, for the Discipline and Regulation of the Army. (Repealed by Statute Law Revision Act 1927 (17 & 18 Geo. 5. c. 42), Statute Law Revision Act 1950 (14 Geo. 6. c. 6), Statute Law Revision Act 1953 (2 & 3 Eliz. 2. c. 5) and Revision of the Army and Air Force Acts (Transitional Provisions) Act 1955 (3 & 4 Eliz. 2. c. 20))
Seed Potatoes Supply (Ireland) Act 1906 (repealed)	6 Edw. 7. c. 3	29 May 1906
An Act to make provision with respect to loans and Rales made for the purpose of the supply of Seed Potatoes to occupiers and cultivators of land in Ireland. (Repealed by Statute Law Revision Act 1927 (17 & 18 Geo. 5. c. 42))
Post Office (Money Orders) Act 1906 (repealed)	6 Edw. 7. c. 4	29 May 1906
An Act to extend certain provisions of the Post Office (Money Orders) Acts to Money Orders transmitted to and from Foreign States and British Protectorates. (Repealed by Post Office Act 1908 (8 Edw. 7. c. 48))
Seamen's and Soldiers' False Characters Act 1906 (repealed)	6 Edw. 7. c. 5	22 June 1906
An Act to amend the Law relating to the falsification of Seamen's and Soldiers' Certificates of Service or Discharge, and to false statements made, used, or given in connection with Entry or Enlistment into His Majesty's Naval, Military, or Marine Forces. (Repealed by Statute Law (Repeals) Act 2008 (c. 12))
Metropolitan Police (Commission) Act 1906 (repealed)	6 Edw. 7. c. 6	22 June 1906
An Act to facilitate the proceedings of the Commissioners appointed to hold an Inquiry respecting the Duties of the Metropolitan Police in dealing with cases of Drunkenness, Disorder, and Solicitation in the Streets. (Repealed by Statute Law Revision Act 1927 (17 & 18 Geo. 5. c. 42))
Police (Superannuation) Act 1906 (repealed)	6 Edw. 7. c. 7	22 June 1906
An Act to amend the Law relating to the Superannuation of Constables. (Repealed by Police Pensions Act 1921 (11 & 12 Geo. 5. c. 31))
Finance Act 1906 (repealed)	6 Edw. 7. c. 8	22 June 1906
An Act to grant certain duties of Customs and Inland Revenue, to alter other duties, and to amend the Law relating to Customs and Inland Revenue and the National Debt, and to make other provisions for the financial arrangements of the year. (Repealed by Customs and Excise Act 1952 (15 & 16 Geo. 6 & 1 Eliz. 2. c. 44))
Indian Railways Act Amendment Act 1906 (repealed)	6 Edw. 7. c. 9	20 July 1906
All Act to amend the Indian Railways Act, 1894. (Note: Indian Railways Act 1894 (57 & 58 Vict. c. 12)) (Repealed by Statute Law Revision Act 1927 (17 & 18 Geo. 5. c. 42))
Education of Defective Children (Scotland) Act 1906 (repealed)	6 Edw. 7. c. 10	20 July 1906
An Act to provide for the Education and Conveyance to School of Epileptic and Crippled and Defective Children. (Repealed by Education (Scotland) Act 1945 (8 & 9 Geo. 6. c. 37))
Reserve Forces Act 1906 (repealed)	6 Edw. 7. c. 11	20 July 1906
An Act to amend the Law relating to the Reserve Forces. (Repealed by Army Reserve Act 1950 (14 Geo. 6. c. 32) and Air Force Reserve Act 1950 (14 Geo. 6. c. 33))
Municipal Corporations Amendment Act 1906 (repealed)	6 Edw. 7. c. 12	20 July 1906
An Act to amend the Municipal Corporations Act, 1882. (Note: Municipal Corporations Act 1882 (45 & 46 Vict. c. 50)) (Repealed by Local Government Act 1933 (23 & 24 Geo. 5. c. 51))
Wireless Telegraphy Act 1906 (repealed)	6 Edw. 7. c. 13	20 July 1906
An Act to continue the Wireless Telegraphy Act, 1904. (Note: Wireless Telegraphy Act 1904 (4 Edw. 7. c. 24)) (Repealed by Expiring Laws Continuance Act 1909 (9 Edw. 7. c. 46))
Alkali, &c. Works Regulation Act 1906 (repealed)	6 Edw. 7. c. 14	4 August 1906
An Act to consolidate and amend the Alkali, &c. Works Regulation Acts 1881 (Note: Alkali, &c. Works Regulation Act 1881 (44 & 45 Vict. c. 37)) and 1892. (Note: Alkali, &c. Works Regulation Act 1892 (55 & 56 Vict. c. 30)) (Repealed for England and Wales and Scotland by Environmental Protection Act 1990 (c. 43) and for Northern Ireland by Industrial Pollution Control (Northern Ireland) Order 1997 (SI 1997/2777 (N.I. 18)))
Extradition Act 1906 (repealed)	6 Edw. 7. c. 15	4 August 1906
An Act to include Bribery amongst Extradition Crimes. (Repealed by Extradition Act 1989 (c. 33))
Justices of the Peace Act 1906 (repealed)	6 Edw. 7. c. 16	4 August 1906
An Act to amend the Law relating to Justices of the Peace. (Repealed for England and Wales by Statute Law Revision Act 1927 (17 & 18 Geo. 5. c. 42), Justices of the Peace Act 1949 (12, 13 & 14 Geo. 6. c. 101), Justices of the Peace Act 1968 (c. 69) and Administration of Justice Act 1973 (c. 15) and for Scotland by District Courts (Scotland) Act 1975 (c. 20))
Bills of Exchange (Crossed Cheques) Act 1906 (repealed)	6 Edw. 7. c. 17	4 August 1906
An Act to amend section eighty-two of the Bills of Exchange Act, 1882. (Note: Bills of Exchange Act 1882) (Repealed by Cheques Act 1957 (5 & 6 Eliz. 2. c. 36))
Isle of Man (Customs) Act 1906 (repealed)	6 Edw. 7. c. 18	4 August 1906
An Act to amend the Law with respect to Customs Duties in the Isle of Man. (Repealed by Statute Law Revision Act 1927 (17 & 18 Geo. 5. c. 42))
Deanery of Manchester Act 1906 (repealed)	6 Edw. 7. c. 19	4 August 1906
An Act to make further provision with respect to the Revenues of the Deanery of Manchester. (Repealed by Cathedrals Measure 1963 (No. 2))
Revenue Act 1906 (repealed)	6 Edw. 7. c. 20	4 August 1906
An Act to amend the Law relating to Customs and Inland Revenue, and for other purposes connected with Finance. (Repealed by Statute Law (Repeals) Act 1971 (c. 52))
Ground Game (Amendment) Act 1906	6 Edw. 7. c. 21	4 August 1906
An Act to amend the Ground Game Act, 1880. (Note: Ground Game Act 1880 (43 & 44 Vict. c. 47)) (Repealed for Scotland by Agriculture (Scotland) Act 1948 (11 & 12 Geo. 6. c. 45))
Post Office (Literature for the Blind) Act 1906 (repealed)	6 Edw. 7. c. 22	4 August 1906
An Act to facilitate the transmission by Post of Books and Papers impressed for the use of the Blind. (Repealed by Post Office Act 1908 (8 Edw. 7. c. 48))
Charitable Loan Societies (Ireland) Act 1906 (repealed)	6 Edw. 7. c. 23	4 August 1906
An Act to amend the Acts relating to Charitable Loan Societies in Ireland. (Repealed by Finance (Miscellaneous Provisions) Act (Northern Ireland) 1955 (c. 19 (N.I.)))
Solicitors Act 1906 (repealed)	6 Edw. 7. c. 24	4 August 1906
An Act to amend the Solicitors Acts. (Repealed by Solicitors Act 1932 (22 & 23 Geo. 5. c. 37))
Open Spaces Act 1906	6 Edw. 7. c. 25	4 August 1906
An Act to consolidate Enactments relating to Open Spaces.
Appropriation Act 1906 (repealed)	6 Edw. 7. c. 26	4 August 1906
An Act to apply a sum out of the Consolidated Fund to the service of the year ending on the thirty-first day of March one thousand nine hundred and seven, and to appropriate the Supplies granted in this Session of Parliament. (Repealed by Statute Law Revision Act 1927 (17 & 18 Geo. 5. c. 42))
Fertilisers and Feeding Stuffs Act 1906 (repealed)	6 Edw. 7. c. 27	4 August 1906
An Act to amend the law with respect to the sale of Agricultural Fertilisers and Feeding Stuffs. (Repealed by Fertilisers and Feeding Stuffs Act 1926 (16 & 17 Geo. 5. c. 45))
Crown Lands Act 1906	6 Edw. 7. c. 28	4 August 1906
An Act to amend the Crown Lands Acts, 1829 to 1894.
Public Works Loans Act 1906 (repealed)	6 Edw. 7. c. 29	4 August 1906
An Act to grant Money for the purpose of certain Local Loans out of the Local Loans Fund, and for other purposes relating to Local Loans. (Repealed by Statute Law Revision Act 1927 (17 & 18 Geo. 5. c. 42))
Colonial Marriages (Deceased Wife's Sister) Act 1906 (repealed)	6 Edw. 7. c. 30	4 August 1906
An Act to declare the law with respect to a marriage between a man and his deceased wife's sister domiciled in parts of the British Possessions where such a marriage is legal. (Repealed by Statute Law Revision Act 1927 (17 & 18 Geo. 5. c. 42))
Local Government (Ireland) Act (1898) Amendment Act 1906 (repealed)	6 Edw. 7. c. 31	4 August 1906
An Act to amend the Local Government (Ireland) Act, 1898, (Note: Local Government (Ireland) Act 1898 (61 & 62 Vict. c. 37)) with respect to Bridges. (Repealed by Roads and Road Traffic (Northern Ireland) Order 1978 (SI 1978/1051 (N.I. 21)))
Dogs Act 1906	6 Edw. 7. c. 32	4 August 1906
An Act to consolidate and amend the Enactments relating to injury to live stock by Dogs, and otherwise to amend the Law relating to Dogs. (Repealed for Northern Ireland by Dogs (Northern Ireland) Order 1983 (SI 1983/764 (N.I. 8)))
Local Authorities (Treasury Powers) Act 1906 (repealed)	6 Edw. 7. c. 33	4 August 1906
An Act to transfer to the Local Government Board the Powers of the Treasury under enactments relating to Local Authorities. (Repealed by Statute Law (Repeals) Act 1981 (c. 19))
Prevention of Corruption Act 1906 (repealed)	6 Edw. 7. c. 34	4 August 1906
An Act for the better Prevention of Corruption. (Repealed by Bribery Act 2010 (c. 23))
Fatal Accidents and Sudden Deaths Inquiry (Scotland) Act 1906 (repealed)	6 Edw. 7. c. 35	4 August 1906
An Act to amend the Fatal Accidents Inquiry (Scotland) Act, 1895, (Note: Fatal Accidents Inquiry (Scotland) Act 1895 (58 & 59 Vict. c. 36)) and to make further provision for Inquiry into Sudden and Suspicious Deaths in Scotland. (Repealed by Fatal Accidents and Sudden Deaths Inquiry (Scotland) Act 1976 (c. 14))
Musical Copyright Act 1906 (repealed)	6 Edw. 7. c. 36	4 August 1906
An Act to amend the law relating to Musical Copyright. (Repealed by Copyright Act 1956 (4 & 5 Eliz. 2. c. 74))
Labourers (Ireland) Act 1906 (repealed)	6 Edw. 7. c. 37	4 August 1906
An Act to amend the Law relating to Labourers in Ireland and to make provision with respect to the application of portion of the Ireland Development Grant. (Repealed by Statute Law Revision Act (Northern Ireland) 1954 (c. 35 (N.I.)))
Statute Law Revision (Scotland) Act 1906	6 Edw. 7. c. 38	4 August 1906
An Act to further promote the Revision of the Statute Law by repealing Enactments which have ceased to be in force or have become unnecessary.
Intoxicating Liquors (Ireland) Act 1906 (repealed)	6 Edw. 7. c. 39	29 November 1906
An Act to amend the Law relating to the Sale of Intoxicating Liquors in Ireland on Saturdays and Sundays, and for other purposes connected therewith. (Repealed by Intoxicating Liquor Act (Northern Ireland) 1923 (13 & 14 Geo. 5. c. 12 (N.I.)))
Marriage with Foreigners Act 1906	6 Edw. 7. c. 40	29 November 1906
An Act to amend the Law with respect to Marriages between British Subjects and Foreigners.
Marine Insurance Act 1906	6 Edw. 7. c. 41	21 December 1906
An Act to codify the Law relating to Marine Insurance.
Licensing Act 1906 (repealed)	6 Edw. 7. c. 42	21 December 1906
An Act to remove doubts as to the manner in which the powers and duties of justices acting in and for a borough may be exercised under the Licensing Acts, 1828 to 1904. (Repealed by Licensing (Consolidation) Act 1910 (10 Edw. 7 & 1 Geo. 5. c. 24))
Street Betting Act 1906 (repealed)	6 Edw. 7. c. 43	21 December 1906
An Act for the Suppression of Betting in Streets and other Public Places. (Repealed for England and Wales and Scotland by Betting, Gaming and Lotteries Act 1963 (c. 2) and for Northern Ireland by Betting, Gaming, Lotteries and Amusements (Northern Ireland) Order 1985 (SI 1985/1204 (N.I. 11)))
Burial Act 1906 (repealed)	6 Edw. 7. c. 44	21 December 1906
An Act to amend the Law with respect to the consents required for the use of ground for burials and the construction of Cemeteries. (Repealed by Local Government Act 1972 (c. 70))
Removal of Offensive Matter Act 1906 (repealed)	6 Edw. 7. c. 45	21 December 1906
An Act to repeal the provisions of the Metropolitan Police Act, 1839, (Note: Metropolitan Police Act 1839 (2 & 3 Vict. c. 47)) with respect to the removal of Offensive Matter in places within the Metropolitan Police District. (Repealed by Statute Law Revision Act 1927 (17 & 18 Geo. 5. c. 42))
Recorders, Stipendiary Magistrates, and Clerks of the Peace Act 1906 (repealed)	6 Edw. 7. c. 46	21 December 1906
An Act to make provision as to the appointment of Deputies for Recorders, Stipendiary Magistrates, and Clerks of the Peace, and for the temporary performance of the duties of those officers in case of vacancies. (Repealed by Courts Act 1971 (c. 23))
Trade Disputes Act 1906 (repealed)	6 Edw. 7. c. 47	21 December 1906
An Act to provide for the regulation of Trades Unions and Trade Disputes. (Repealed by Industrial Relations Act 1971 (c. 72))
Merchant Shipping Act 1906	6 Edw. 7. c. 48	21 December 1906
An Act to amend the Merchant Shipping Acts 1894 to 1900.
Census of Production Act 1906 (repealed)	6 Edw. 7. c. 49	21 December 1906
An Act to provide for taking a Census of Production. (Repealed for England and Wales and Scotland by Factories Act 1937 (1 Edw. 8 & 1 Geo. 6. c. 67) and Statistics of Trade Act 1947 (10 & 11 Geo. 6. c. 39) and for Northern Ireland by Statistics of Trade Act (Northern Ireland) 1949 (c. 7 (N.I.)))
National Galleries of Scotland Act 1906	6 Edw. 7. c. 50	21 December 1906
An Act to establish a Board of Trustees to manage the National Galleries of Scotland; and for other purposes.
Expiring Laws Continuance Act 1906 (repealed)	6 Edw. 7. c. 51	21 December 1906
All Act to continue various Expiring Laws. (Repealed by Statute Law Revision Act 1927 (17 & 18 Geo. 5. c. 42))
Land Tax Commissioners Act 1906 (repealed)	6 Edw. 7. c. 52	21 December 1906
An Act to appoint additional Commissioners for executing the Acts granting a Land Tax and other Rates and Taxes, and to remove the qualification by estate required in the case of all such Commissioners, whether appointed under this or any previous Act. (Repealed by Finance Act 1963 (c. 25))
Notice of Accidents Act 1906	6 Edw. 7. c. 53	21 December 1906
An Act to amend the Law relating to Returns and Notifications of Accidents in Mines, Quarries, Factories, and Workshops, and under the Notice of Accidents Act 1894. (Note: Notice of Accidents Act 1894 (57 & 58 Vict. c. 28)) (Repealed for England and Wales and Scotland by Transport and Works Act 1992 (c. 42))
Town Tenants (Ireland) Act 1906	6 Edw. 7. c. 54	21 December 1906
An Act to improve the position of Tenants of certain Houses, Shops, or other Buildings in Ireland.
Public Trustee Act 1906	6 Edw. 7. c. 55	21 December 1906
An Act to provide for the appointment of a Public Trustee and to amend the Law relating to the administration of Trusts.
Agricultural Holdings Act 1906 (repealed)	6 Edw. 7. c. 56	21 December 1906
An Act to amend the Law relating to Agricultural Holdings. (Repealed by Agricultural Holdings Act 1908 (8 Edw. 7. c. 28) and Agricultural Holdings (Scotland) Act 1908 (8 Edw. 7. c. 64))
Education (Provision of Meals) Act 1906 (repealed)	6 Edw. 7. c. 57	21 December 1906
An Act to make provision for Meals for Children attending Public Elementary Schools in England and Wales. (Repealed by Education Act 1921 (11 & 12 Geo. 5. c. 51))
Workmen's Compensation Act 1906 (repealed)	6 Edw. 7. c. 58	21 December 1906
An Act to consolidate and amend the Law with respect to Compensation to Workmen for Injuries suffered in the course of their Employment. (Repealed for England and Wales and Scotland by Workmen's Compensation Act 1925 (15 & 16 Geo. 5. c. 84) and for Northern Ireland by Workmen's Compensation Act (Northern Ireland) 1923 (13 & 14 Geo. 5. c. 33 (N.I.)), Workmen's Compensation Act (Northern Ireland) 1927 (17 & 18 Geo. 5. c. 16 (N.I.)) and National Insurance (Industrial Injuries) Act (Northern Ireland) 1946 (c. 21 (N.I.)))

=== Local acts ===
Short title	Citation	Royal assent
Long title
Crystal Palace Company's Act 1906 (repealed)	6 Edw. 7. c. i	29 May 1906
An Act to make further provision with respect to the capital of the Crystal Palace Company and to empower them to raise additional capital. (Repealed by London County Council (Crystal Palace) Act 1951 (14 & 15 Geo. 6. c. xxviii))
Dover Harbour Board Act 1906 (repealed)	6 Edw. 7. c. ii	29 May 1906
An Act to alter the constitution of the Dover Harbour Board. (Repealed by Dover Harbour Act 1953 (1 & 2 Eliz. 2. c. xxix))
Kidderminster Gas Act 1906	6 Edw. 7. c. iii	29 May 1906
An Act for authorising the Kidderminster Gas Light and Coke Company to alter their name to construct new gasworks to provide for the conversion and consolidation of certain of their existing capital to raise additional capital and for other purposes.
H. R. Baines and Company's Act 1906	6 Edw. 7. c. iv	29 May 1906
An Act to confirm the capitalisation in past years of certain profits of H. R. Baines and Company Limited and for other purposes.
Vauclain's Patent Act 1906	6 Edw. 7. c. v	29 May 1906
An Act for rendering valid certain letters patent granted to Samuel Mathews Vauclain for an invention for improvements in compound steam locomotives.
Bethnal Green Borough Council (Superannuation) Act 1906	6 Edw. 7. c. vi	29 May 1906
An Act to provide for the granting of superannuation allowances to the officers and servants of the Council of the metropolitan borough of Bethnal Green and for other purposes.
Millwall Dock Act 1906 (repealed)	6 Edw. 7. c. vii	29 May 1906
An Act to confer further powers upon the Millwall Dock Company with respect to superfluous lands. (Repealed by Port of London (Consolidation) Act 1920 (10 & 11 Geo. 5. c. clxxiii))
Antofagasta (Chile) and Bolivia Railway (Conversion of Stock) Act 1906	6 Edw. 7. c. viii	29 May 1906
An Act to provide for the conversion of the stock of the Antofagasta (Chili) and Bolivia Railway Company Limited into five per centum per annum cumulative preference stock preferred ordinary stock and deferred ordinary stock and for other purposes.
Sheffield Assay Act 1906	6 Edw. 7. c. ix	29 May 1906
An Act to make further and better provision for the execution of the powers and duties of the Guardians of the Standard of Wrought Plate in Sheffield.
Manchester and Milford Railway (Leasing) Act 1906	6 Edw. 7. c. x	29 May 1906
An Act for authorising a lease of the Manchester and Milford Railway to the Great Western Railway Company and for other purposes.
North Metropolitan Tramways (Winding Up) Act 1906	6 Edw. 7. c. xi	29 May 1906
An Act to provide for the winding up and dissolution of the North Metropolitan Tramways Company and for other purposes.
Carlisle Corporation Act 1906 (repealed)	6 Edw. 7. c. xii	29 May 1906
An Act to empower the Corporation of Carlisle to acquire additional lands for the purposes of their Geltsdale Waterworks to extend the time for the completion of those works to authorise the Corporation to borrow further moneys for the purposes of their gas and water undertakings and for other purposes. (Repealed by Cumbria Act 1982 (c. xv))
Essex and Suffolk Equitable Insurance Society Act 1906	6 Edw. 7. c. xiii	29 May 1906
An Act to repeal the deeds of settlement of the Essex and Suffolk Equitable Insurance Society from the date of its registration as a limited company and to enlarge the scope of operations of the Society and to make provision for the future government of the Society and the management of its affairs and for other purposes.
Milford Docks Act 1906 (repealed)	6 Edw. 7. c. xiv	29 May 1906
An Act to amend the Acts relating to the Milford Docks Company to extend the time limited for the completion of a certain work to enable the Company to acquire lands compulsorily and for other purposes. (Repealed by Milford Docks Act 1953 (1 & 2 Eliz. 2. c. x))
Mirfield Gas Act 1906	6 Edw. 7. c. xv	29 May 1906
An Act for conferring further powers on the Mirfield Gas Company.
Thornton Urban District Gas Act 1906	6 Edw. 7. c. xvi	29 May 1906
An Act to empower the urban district council of Thornton in the county palatine of Lancaster to supply gas and to provide for the transfer to the Council of such portion of the gasworks undertaking and plant of the Poulton-le-Fylde Urban District Council as is contained within the urban district of Thornton and for other purposes.
Accrington District Gas and Water Board Act 1906	6 Edw. 7. c. xvii	29 May 1906
An Act to authorise the Accrington District Gas and Water Board to make new waterworks and for other purposes.
Great Eastern Railway Act 1906	6 Edw. 7. c. xviii	29 May 1906
An Act for conferring further powers upon the Great Eastern Railway Company for authorising the abandonment of certain works for extending the time limited by former Acts for the completion of works and the purchase of lands and for other purposes.
Knott End Railway (Extension of Time) Act 1906	6 Edw. 7. c. xix	29 May 1906
An Act for extending the period limited by the Knott End Railway Act 1898 (Note: Knott End Railway Act 1898 (61 & 62 Vict. c. ccxliv)) for the construction and completion of the railway by that Act authorised and for other purposes.
County of Aberdeen (Monymusk Bridge and Road) Order Confirmation Act 1906	6 Edw. 7. c. xx	29 May 1906
An Act to confirm a Provisional Order under the Private Legislation Procedure (Scotland) Act 1899 (Note: Private Legislation Procedure (Scotland) Act 1899 (62 & 63 Vict. c. 47)) relating to the County of Aberdeen (Monymusk Bridge and Road).
	County of Aberdeen (Monymusk Bridge and Road) Order 1906 Provisional Order to authorise the County Road Board of the County of Aberdeen to construct a new road and bridge within the Garioch district of the county and the Garioch District Committee to manage and maintain the same and the County Council of the said county to acquire lands and servitudes for the purposes thereof and to levy assessments and borrow money and for other purposes.	
Cathcart District Railway (Superfluous Lands) Order Confirmation Act 1906	6 Edw. 7. c. xxi	29 May 1906
An Act to confirm a Provisional Order under the Private Legislation Procedure (Scotland) Act 1899 relating to the Cathcart District Railway.
	Cathcart District Railway (Superfluous Lands) Order 1906 Provisional Order to extend the time for the Sale of Superfluous Lands held by the Cathcart District Railway Company.	
North Berwick Corporation Order Confirmation Act 1906	6 Edw. 7. c. xxii	29 May 1906
An Act to confirm a Provisional Order under the Private Legislation Procedure (Scotland) Act 1899 relating to North Berwick Corporation.
	North Berwick Corporation Links and Burgh Extension Order 1906 Provisional Order to empower the Provost Magistrates and Councillors of the Royal Burgh of North Berwick to acquire the Rhodes Links and other adjoining lands for a Public Park and Recreation Ground and to extend the boundaries of the said Burgh and for other purposes.	
Metropolitan Police Provisional Order Confirmation Act 1906 (repealed)	6 Edw. 7. c. xxiii	29 May 1906
An Act to confirm a Provisional Order made by one of His Majesty's Principal Secretaries of State under the Metropolitan Police Act 1886 (Note: Metropolitan Police Act 1886 (49 & 50 Vict. c. 22)) relating to Lands in the Borough of Deptford and the Royal Borough of Kensington. (Repealed by Statute Law (Repeals) Act 2008 (c. 12))
	Order made by the Secretary of State under the Metropolitan Police Act 1886.	
Electric Lighting Order Confirmation (No. 1) Act 1906	6 Edw. 7. c. xxiv	22 June 1906
An Act to confirm a Provisional Order made by the Board of Trade under the Electric Lighting Acts 1882 (Note: Electric Lighting Act 1882 (45 & 46 Vict. c. 56)) and 1888 (Note: Electric Lighting Act 1888 (51 & 52 Vict. c. 12)) relating to Waterford.
	Waterford Electric Lighting Order 1906 Provisional Order granted by the Board of Trade under the Electric Lighting Acts 1882 and 1888 to the National Provincial Electricity Corporation Limited in respect of the Borough of Waterford in the County of the City of Waterford.	
Electric Lighting Orders Confirmation (No. 2) Act 1906	6 Edw. 7. c. xxv	22 June 1906
An Act to confirm certain Provisional Orders made by the Board of Trade under the Electric Lighting Acts 1882 and 1888 relating to Abercarn Barry (Amendment) Bettwsycoed Blaydon (Amendment) Calverley (Amendment) Farsley Foots Cray (Amendment) Horsford (Amendment) Market Harborough and Wembley.
	Abercarn Electric Lighting Order 1906 Provisional Order granted by the Board of Trade under the Electric Lighting Acts 1882 and 1888 to the Urban District Council of Abercarn in respect of the Urban District of Abercarn in the County of Monmouth.	
	Barry Electric Lighting Order 1906 Provisional Order granted by the Board of Trade under the Electric Lighting Acts 1882 and 1888 amending the Barry Electric Lighting Orders 1901 and 1904.	
	Bettwsycoed Electric Lighting Order 1906 Provisional Order granted by the Board of Trade under the Electric Lighting Acts 1882 and 1888 to the Urban District Council of Bettwsycoed in respect of the Urban District of Bettwsycoed in the County of Carnarvon.	
	Blaydon Electric Lighting Order 1906 Provisional Order granted by the Board of Trade under the Electric Lighting Acts 1882 and 1888 to the Urban District Council of Blaydon to authorise the Council to transfer the Undertaking authorised by the Blaydon Electric Lighting Order 1902 to the County of Durham Electrical Power Distribution Company Limited and for the amendment of the Blaydon Electric Lighting Order 1902.	
	Calverley Electric Lighting Order 1906 Provisional Order granted by the Board of Trade under the Electric Lighting Acts 1882 and 1888 amending the Calverley Electric Lighting Order 1903.	
	Farsley Electric Lighting Order 1906 Provisional Order granted by the Board of Trade under the Electric Lighting Acts 1882 and 1888 to the Farsley Urban District Council in respect of the Urban District of Farsley in the West Riding of the County of York.	
	Foots Cray Electric Lighting Order 1906 Provisional Order granted by the Board of Trade under the Electric Lighting Acts 1882 and 1888 to the Urban District Council of Foots Cray amending the Foots Cray Electric Lighting Order 1901.	
	Horsforth Electric Lighting Order 1906 Provisional Order granted by the Board of Trade under the Electric Lighting Acts 1882 and 1888 to the Urban District Council of Horsforth for the Amendment of the Horsforth Electric Lighting Order 1903.	
	Market Harborough Electric Lighting Order 1906 Provisional Order granted by the Board of Trade under the Electric Lighting Acts 1882 and 1888 to the Market Harborough Urban District Council in respect of the Urban District of Market Harborough in the County of Leicester.	
	Wembley Electric Lighting Order 1906 Provisional Order granted by the Board of Trade under the Electric Lighting Acts 1882 and 1888 to the Urban District Council of Wembley in respect of the Urban District of Wembley in the County of Middlesex.	
Provisional Order (Marriages) Confirmation Act 1906 (repealed)	6 Edw. 7. c. xxvi	22 June 1906
An Act to confirm a Provisional Order made by one of His Majesty's Principal Secretaries of State under the Provisional Order (Marriages) Act 1905. (Note: Provisional Order (Marriages) Act 1905 (5 Edw. 7. c. 23)) (Repealed by Statute Law (Repeals) Act 1977 (c. 18))
	Saint Peter Selsey and Saint Nun's Chapel Grampound Order.	
Great North of Scotland Railway Order Confirmation Act 1906	6 Edw. 7. c. xxvii	22 June 1906
An Act to confirm a Provisional Order under the Private Legislation Procedure (Scotland) Act 1899 relating to the Great North of Scotland Railway.
	Great North of Scotland Railway Order 1906 Provisional Order to confer further powers upon the Great North of Scotland Railway Company.	
Local Government Board (Ireland) Provisional Orders Confirmation (No. 1) Act 1906	6 Edw. 7. c. xxviii	22 June 1906
An Act to confirm certain Provisional Orders of the Local Government Board for Ireland relating to the Urban District of Sligo and the Counties of Kildare and Limerick.
	Sligo Order 1906 Provisional Order for altering a Local Act. (Note: Sligo Borough Improvement Act 1869 (32 & 33 Vict. c. cxlvii))	
	Connell Drainage Order 1906 Provisional Order to transfer the business of the Drainage Board for the Connell Drainage District to the County Council of Kildare.	
	Great Munster Fair Order 1906 Provisional Order to transfer the business of the Commissioners of the Great Munster Fair to the County Council of the County of Limerick.	
Holyhead Water Act 1906	6 Edw. 7. c. xxix	22 June 1906
An Act to confer further powers upon the Holyhead Waterworks Company and for other purposes.
Norwich Union Life Insurance Society (Scottish Imperial Fusion) Act 1906 (repealed)	6 Edw. 7. c. xxx	22 June 1906
An Act to effect a fusion of the undertaking of the Scottish Imperial Insurance Company with that of the Norwich Union Life Insurance Society and for other purposes. (Repealed by Statute Law (Repeals) Act 1998 (c. 43))
Lancashire and Yorkshire Railway (Superannuation Fund) Act 1906	6 Edw. 7. c. xxxi	22 June 1906
An Act to amend the provisions of the Lancashire and Yorkshire Railway (New Works and Additional Powers) Act 1871 (Note: Lancashire and Yorkshire Railway (New Works and Additional Powers) Act 1871 (34 & 35 Vict. c. clxx)) with respect to Superannuation Fund.
Mersey Railway Act 1906	6 Edw. 7. c. xxxii	22 June 1906
An Act to amend the Mersey Railway Act 1900 (Note: Mersey Railway Act 1900 (63 & 64 Vict. c. cxxxiv)) and for other purposes.
North Sussex Gas and Water Act 1906 (repealed)	6 Edw. 7. c. xxxiii	22 June 1906
An Act to empower the North Sussex Gas Company to supply water in certain parishes in Sussex and to confer further powers upon that Company. (Repealed by Cuckfield and Horsham Water Order 1947 (SR&O 1947/585))
Preston, Chorley and Horwich Tramways Act 1906	6 Edw. 7. c. xxxiv	22 June 1906
An Act to authorise the Preston Chorley and Horwich Tramways Company to acquire lands for road widenings to abandon a portion of their authorised tramways and to construct other works in lieu thereof to extend the period limited for construction of works and land purchases and for other purposes.
New Mills Urban District Council Act 1906	6 Edw. 7. c. xxxv	22 June 1906
An Act to authorise the urban district council of New Mills to purchase the Ollerset Waterworks undertaking and such portion of the waterworks and plant of the Stockport Corporation as is within the district of the Council and to supply water throughout their district and to make further provision in regard to the gas undertaking of the Council and for other purposes.
North East Lincolnshire Water Act 1906	6 Edw. 7. c. xxxvi	22 June 1906
An Act for incorporating and conferring powers upon the North East Lincolnshire Water Company and for other purposes.
National Assurance Company of Ireland Act 1906	6 Edw. 7. c. xxxvii	22 June 1906
An Act to effect a fusion of the life assurance and annuity business of the National Assurance Company of Ireland with the undertaking of the Yorkshire Fire and Life Insurance Company and for other purposes.
South Lancashire Tramways Act 1906 (repealed)	6 Edw. 7. c. xxxviii	22 June 1906
An Act to extend the time for purchasing lands and for the construction and completion of certain tramways street widenings and works authorised by the South Lancashire Tramways Acts 1900 (Note: South Lancashire Tramways Act 1900 (63 & 64 Vict. c. ccxliii)) 1901 (Note: South Lancashire Tramways Act 1901 (1 Edw. 7. c. cclvii)) and 1903 (Note: South Lancashire Tramways Act 1903 (3 Edw. 7. c. clviii)) and for other purposes. (Repealed by South Lancashire Transport Act 1958 (6 & 7 Eliz. 2. c. xxxiii))
Scottish Provident Institution Buildings Limited Act 1906	6 Edw. 7. c. xxxix	22 June 1906
An Act to enable the Scottish Provident Institution Buildings Limited to pay interest out of capital on certain of their shares and for other purposes.
Mersey Docks and Harbour Board Act 1906	6 Edw. 7. c. xl	22 June 1906
An Act to authorise the Mersey Docks and Harbour Board to construct additional dock and other works and for other purposes.
Maryport Railways and Docks Act 1906 (repealed)	6 Edw. 7. c. xli	20 July 1906
An Act to extend the powers and to change the name of the Maryport Harbour Company and for other purposes. (Repealed by Maryport Harbour Revision Order 2007 (SI 2007/3463))
Southampton Gas Act 1906	6 Edw. 7. c. xlii	20 July 1906
An Act to authorise the Southampton Gaslight and Coke Company to raise additional capital and for other purposes.
Gas Companies Removal of Sulphur Restrictions Act 1906	6 Edw. 7. c. xliii	20 July 1906
An Act to remove the restrictions in respect of sulphur compounds (other than sulphuretted hydrogen) now imposed upon certain gas companies.
Buenos Aires Grand National Tramways Company Act 1906	6 Edw. 7. c. xliv	20 July 1906
An Act to make provision for dealing with the arrears of dividend on the preference and second preference shares of the Buenos Ayres Grand National Tramways Company Limited and the accumulated balance to the debit of its revenue account and for the increase and re-arrangement of its capital and for other purposes.
Channel Ferry (Dover) Act 1906	6 Edw. 7. c. xlv	20 July 1906
An Act to provide for the incorporation of a Company for providing accommodation for trans-channel traffic and for other purposes.
Hull Joint Dock Act 1906	6 Edw. 7. c. xlvi	20 July 1906
An Act to confer additional powers upon the Hull Joint Dock Committee for the construction of dock works and upon the North Eastern Railway Company for the construction of new railways and for other purposes.
Crellin's Patents Act 1906	6 Edw. 7. c. xlvii	20 July 1906
An Act for rendering valid certain letters patent granted to John Caesar Crellin for inventions for (1) an appliance for raising lowering supporting and transporting portions of machinery and the like (2) improvements relating to lifting-jacks and (3) improved apparatus for raising lowering supporting and transporting portions of machinery and like uses.
Rugby Lower School (Transfer) Act 1906	6 Edw. 7. c. xlviii	20 July 1906
An Act to transfer the Lower School of Lawrence Sheriff at Rugby to the governors of the Lower School of Lawrence Sheriff Rugby constituted by this Act and for other purposes.
Haslingden Corporation Act 1906	6 Edw. 7. c. xlix	20 July 1906
An Act to authorise the corporation of Haslingden to construct and work tramways and to make further provision for the improvement local government and health of the borough of Haslingden and for other purposes.
North and South Shields Electric Railway Act 1906	6 Edw. 7. c. l	20 July 1906
An Act to enlarge the powers of the North and South Shields Electric Railway Company with reference to the acquisition of lands and the construction of works.
Brixham Gas and Electricity Act 1906	6 Edw. 7. c. li	20 July 1906
An Act to empower the Brixham Gas Company to supply electricity and to confer further powers on the Company.
Barry Railway Act 1906	6 Edw. 7. c. lii	20 July 1906
An Act to confer further powers on the Barry Railway Company.
East Hull Gas Act 1906 (repealed)	6 Edw. 7. c. liii	20 July 1906
An Act for conferring further powers on the Sutton Southcoates and Drypool Gas Company. (Repealed by East Hull Gas Act 1933 (23 & 24 Geo. 5. c. lxxxv))
Cambrian Railways Act 1906	6 Edw. 7. c. liv	20 July 1906
An Act to authorise the Cambrian Railways Company to acquire additional lands and to extend the time for the completion of the railway authorised by the Cambrian Railways Act 1901 (Note: Cambrian Railways Act 1901 (1 Edw. 7. c. lxix)) and for other purposes.
Metropolitan District Railway Act 1906	6 Edw. 7. c. lv	20 July 1906
An Act to empower the Metropolitan District Railway Company to construct new railways and a subway to acquire lands to raise further capital and for other purposes.
Hull and Barnsley and Great Central Railways Act 1906	6 Edw. 7. c. lvi	20 July 1906
An Act to authorise the transfer to the Hull and Barnsley and Great Central Railway Companies of certain works authorised by the Hull Barnsley and West Riding Junction Railway and Dock (South Yorkshire Extension Lines) Act 1902 (Note: Hull, Barnsley and West Riding Junction Railway and Dock (South Yorkshire Extension Lines) Act 1902 (2 Edw. 7. c. ccxvii)) and to the Great Central Railway Company of the undertaking of the Rotherham Maltby and Laughton Railway Company to empower the Hull and Barnsley Railway Company to construct a new railway and to acquire additional lands and for other purposes.
Trent Navigation Act 1906	6 Edw. 7. c. lvii	20 July 1906
An Act to authorise the Trent Navigation Company to construct certain new works for improving the navigation of the River Trent between Wilden Ferry and Gainsborough to confer further powers upon the Company and for other purposes.
Merthyr Tydfil Gas Act 1906	6 Edw. 7. c. lviii	20 July 1906
An Act to authorise the Merthyr Tydfil Gas Company to construct new works to raise additional capital to convert their existing capital and for other purposes.
Bombay, Baroda and Central India Railway Act 1906 (repealed)	6 Edw. 7. c. lix	20 July 1906
An Act to provide for matters consequent on the purchase by the Secretary of State in Council of India of the railways and other property of the Bombay Baroda and Central India Railway Company and for other purposes. (Repealed by Statute Law (Repeals) Act 2013 (c. 2))
Nottinghamshire and Derbyshire Tramways Act 1906	6 Edw. 7. c. lx	20 July 1906
An Act to extend the time limited for the purchase of lands and for the construction and completion of the tramways street widenings and works authorised by the Nottinghamshire and Derbyshire Tramways Act 1903 (Note: Nottinghamshire and Derbyshire Tramways Act 1903 (3 Edw. 7. c. ccii)) and for other purposes.
Clacton Urban District Council (Transfer of Powers of Clacton-on-Sea Commissioners) Act 1906	6 Edw. 7. c. lxi	20 July 1906
An Act to transfer to the urban district council of Clacton the powers and property of the commissioners appointed under the provisions of the Clacton-on-Sea Special Drainage District Act 1880 (Note: Clacton-on-Sea Special Drainage District Act 1880 (43 & 44 Vict. c. xlii)) to enable them to construct further sea defence works and for other purposes.
Newport Harbour Act 1906	6 Edw. 7. c. lxii	20 July 1906
An Act to confer further powers on the Newport Harbour Commissioners and for other purposes.
Railway Clearing System Superannuation Fund (Contributing Companies) Act 1906	6 Edw. 7. c. lxiii	20 July 1906
An Act to authorise increased contributions to the Railway Clearing System Superannuation Fund Corporation by the railway companies and bodies contributing thereto.
Sheffield District Railway Act 1906	6 Edw. 7. c. lxiv	20 July 1906
An Act to authorise the Sheffield District Railway Company to enter into and carry into effect working and other agreements and for other purposes.
Kettering Water Act 1906 (repealed)	6 Edw. 7. c. lxv	20 July 1906
An Act to extend the time for the construction of works and the acquisition of lands authorised by the Kettering Urban District Water Act 1901 (Note: Kettering Urban District Water Act 1901 (1 Edw. 7. c. lxxxv)) to provide for the transfer of the water undertaking of the Kettering Urban District Council in the parish of Weekley to the Kettering Rural District Council and for other purposes. (Repealed by Mid-Northamptonshire Water Board Order Confirmation (Special Procedure) Act 1949 (12, 13 & 14 Geo. 6. c. ix))
Bury Corporation Act 1906	6 Edw. 7. c. lxvi	20 July 1906
An Act to authorise the corporation of Bury to construct additional tramways within and beyond the borough and for other purposes.
South Suburban Gas Act 1906 (repealed)	6 Edw. 7. c. lxvii	20 July 1906
An Act to make further provisions with respect to the Gas supplied by the South Suburban Gas Company and the price to be charged therefor and for other pui-poses. (Repealed by South Suburban Gas Act 1928 (18 & 19 Geo. 5. c. lxxx))
Hull and Barnsley Railway (Steam Vessels) Act 1906	6 Edw. 7. c. lxviii	20 July 1906
An Act to authorise the Hull and Barnsley Railway Company to provide and work steam vessels between the port of Hull and certain continental ports and to subscribe to the funds of steamship companies and for other purposes.
Manchester Churches Act 1906	6 Edw. 7. c. lxix	20 July 1906
An Act to authorise the closing and sale of certain churches in the city of Manchester the extinction of certain ecclesiastical parishes and the merger thereof in other parishes in the said city and for other purposes.
Penllwyn Railway Act 1906	6 Edw. 7. c. lxx	20 July 1906
An Act to incorporate the Penllwyn Railway Company and for other purposes.
Metropolitan Railway Act 1906	6 Edw. 7. c. lxxi	20 July 1906
An Act to confer further powers upon the Metropolitan Railway Company and for other purposes.
Dover Corporation Act 1906 (repealed)	6 Edw. 7. c. lxxii	20 July 1906
An Act to extend the time for taking certain lands and for the construction of certain street works and a tramway authorised by the Dover Corporation Act 1901 (Note: Dover Corporation Act 1901 (1 Edw. 7. c. ccxliii)) to empower the mayor aldermen and burgesses of the borough of Dover to execute a further street work in connexion with such works and for other purposes. (Repealed by County of Kent Act 1981 (c. xviii))
London and North Western Railway Act 1906	6 Edw. 7. c. lxxiii	20 July 1906
An Act for conferring further powers upon the London and North Western Railway Company in relation to their own undertaking and upon that Company in conjunction with the Great Western Railway Company the Caledonian Railway Company the Great Northern Railway Company and the Lancashire and Yorkshire Railway Company in relation to their respective joint undertakings and for other purposes.
Dowlais Gas Act 1906	6 Edw. 7. c. lxxiv	20 July 1906
An Act for incorporating and conferring powers upon the Dowlais Gas and Coke Company Limited and for other purposes.
Epsom and Ewell Gas Act 1906	6 Edw. 7. c. lxxv	20 July 1906
An Act for conferring further powers upon the Epsom and Ewell Gas Company.
Waterford Corporation and Bridge Act 1906	6 Edw. 7. c. lxxvi	20 July 1906
An Act to empower the Corporation of the county borough of Waterford to acquire the existing toll bridge and ferry rights over the River Suir at Waterford to enable them to borrow moneys and for other purposes.
Great Central and Derbyshire Railways Act 1906	6 Edw. 7. c. lxxvii	20 July 1906
An Act to authorise the Great Central Railway Company to acquire the Lancashire Derbyshire and East Coast Railway to construct new railways and works in connection therewith and for other purposes.
Newtownards Urban District Council Act 1906	6 Edw. 7. c. lxxviii	20 July 1906
An Act to amend extend and define the borrowing powers of the Urban District Council of Newtownards in the county of Down to improve and enlarge the gas undertaking of the said Council and to make further provisions for the local government of their district.
Midland Railway Act 1906	6 Edw. 7. c. lxxix	20 July 1906
An Act to confer additional powers upon the Midland Railway Company for the construction of works and upon that Company and the Midland and Great Northern Railways Joint Committee for the acquisition of lands to provide for the vesting of the undertaking of the Halesowen Railway Company in the Midland Railway Company and the Great Western Railway Company and for other purposes.
Uxbridge Gas Act 1906	6 Edw. 7. c. lxxx	20 July 1906
An Act for conferring further powers upon the Uxbridge and Hillingdon Gas Consumers Company and for other purposes.
Dublin, Wicklow and Wexford Railway Act 1906	6 Edw. 7. c. lxxxi	20 July 1906
An Act to confirm an agreement between the Dublin Wicklow and Wexford Railway Company and the Dublin and Kingstown Railway Company and to confer powers on the Dublin Wicklow and Wexford Railway Company as to the alteration conversion and consolidation of their existing debenture preference and ordinary stocks and as to capital and borrowing powers and other matters to change the name of the Company and of their undertaking and for other purposes.
Scottish Union and National Insurance Company's Act 1906 (repealed)	6 Edw. 7. c. lxxxii	20 July 1906
An Act for conferring further powers on the Scottish Union and National Insurance Company and for effecting certain amendments of the Acts which regulate the Company and for other purposes. (Repealed by Scottish Union and National Insurance Company's Act 1956 (4 & 5 Eliz. 2. c. lxv))
Cheltenham Gas Act 1906	6 Edw. 7. c. lxxxiii	20 July 1906
An Act to confer further powers upon the Cheltenham Gas Light and Coke Company and to make further provisions with reference to the undertaking of that Company.
Huddersfield Corporation Act 1906 (repealed)	6 Edw. 7. c. lxxxiv	20 July 1906
An Act to confer further powers on the mayor aldermen and burgesses of the county borough of Huddersfield with respect to the disposal of trade refuse for the construction of tramways and street works and in regard to streets buildings sewers and sanitary matters and for the health local government and improvement of the borough and for other purposes. (Repealed by West Yorkshire Act 1980 (c. xiv))
South Western Railway Act 1906	6 Edw. 7. c. lxxxv	20 July 1906
An Act to confer further powers upon the London and South Western Railway Company to authorise them to execute further works to acquire additional lands to empower that Company and the Midland Railway Company or one of them to acquire additional lands in respect of an undertaking in which they are jointly interested for amalgamating the Waterloo and City Railway Company and the Axminster and Lyme Regis Light Railway Company with the London and South Western Railway Company and for other purposes.
County Office Site (London) Act 1906	6 Edw. 7. c. lxxxvi	20 July 1906
An Act to empower the London County Council to acquire lands for county offices and to construct an embankment in the River Thames and for other purposes.
Metropolitan Water Board Act 1906	6 Edw. 7. c. lxxxvii	20 July 1906
An Act to confer further powers on the Metropolitan Water Board with reference to their undertaking.
North East London Railway Act 1906 (repealed)	6 Edw. 7. c. lxxxviii	20 July 1906
An Act for conferring further powers on the North East London Railway Company and for other purposes. (Repealed by Statute Law (Repeals) Act 2013 (c. 2))
Peterborough Gas Act 1906	6 Edw. 7. c. lxxxix	20 July 1906
An Act for consolidating the capital of the Peterborough Gas Company for enabling that Company to acquire additional lands and to raise additional capital and for other purposes.
Cardiff Gas Act 1906	6 Edw. 7. c. xc	20 July 1906
An Act to confer further powers on the Cardiff Gas Light and Coke Company.
Manchester Corporation Act 1906	6 Edw. 7. c. xci	20 July 1906
An Act to confer further powers upon the Lord Mayor aldermen and citizens of the city of Manchester with reference to the construction of waterworks and the acquisition of lands and for other purposes.
Cumberland Electricity and Power-Gas Act 1906	6 Edw. 7. c. xcii	20 July 1906
An Act for incorporating and conferring powers on the Cumberland Electricity and Power-Gas Company and for other purposes.
Folkestone and District Electricity Supply Act 1906	6 Edw. 7. c. xciii	20 July 1906
An Act to confer further powers upon the Folkestone Electricity Supply Company Limited with respect to the supply of electricity in the urban districts of Folkestone and Sandgate and the borough of Hythe and for other purposes.
Glamorgan and South Wales Water Act 1906	6 Edw. 7. c. xciv	20 July 1906
An Act to empower the Glamorgan County Council to make inquiries and surveys with a view to the utilisation of water supplies in South Wales and for other purposes.
Lancashire and Yorkshire Railway (Various Powers) Act 1906	6 Edw. 7. c. xcv	20 July 1906
An Act to authorise the Lancashire and Yorkshire Railway Company to widen certain railways and to construct other works to acquire additional lands and for other purposes.
Warboys (Union of Districts) Drainage Act 1906	6 Edw. 7. c. xcvi	20 July 1906
An Act for uniting into one drainage district the two drainage districts in the parish of Warboys in the county of Huntingdon known as the First and Third Drainage Districts constituted under an Act of the fifteenth year of King George the Third chapter fifteen (Note: Fen Drainage Act 1775 (15 Geo. 3. c. 65)) and to amend that Act and for other purposes.
Newport Corporation Act 1906	6 Edw. 7. c. xcvii	20 July 1906
An Act to confer further powers on the mayor aldermen and burgesses of the county borough of Newport with regard to the health improvement and good government of the borough and for other purposes.
Forfar Corporation Water Order Confirmation Act 1906	6 Edw. 7. c. xcviii	20 July 1906
An Act to confirm a Provisional Order under the Private Legislation Procedure (Scotland) Act 1899 relating to Forfar Corporation Water.
	Forfar Corporation Water Order 1906 Provisional Order to authorise the Provost Magistrates and Councillors of the Burgh of Forfar to make and maintain additional Waterworks and for other purposes.	
Land Drainage Provisional Order Confirmation Act 1906	6 Edw. 7. c. xcix	20 July 1906
An Act to confirm a Provisional Order under the Land Drainage Act 1861 (Note: Land Drainage Act 1861 (24 & 25 Vict. c. 133)) relating to lands in the Parishes of Belton and West Butterwick in the County of Lincoln (Parts of Lindsey).
	Belton and West Butterwick (Lincolnshire) Drainage Order 1906 In the matter of a proposed Drainage District in the Parishes of Belton and West Butterwick in the County of Lincoln (Parts of Lindsey).	
Local Government Board's Provisional Orders Confirmation (No. 1) Act 1906	6 Edw. 7. c. c	20 July 1906
An Act to confirm certain Provisional Orders of the Local Government Board relating to Bath Cheshunt Hove (two) Nantwich Oystermouth and Tamworth (Rural).
	Bath Order 1906 Provisional Order to enable the Urban Sanitary Authority for the City of Bath to put in force the Compulsory Clauses of the Lands Clauses Acts.	
	Cheshunt Order 1906 Provisional Order to enable the Urban District Council of Cheshunt to put in force the Compulsory Clauses of the Lands Clauses Acts.	
	Hove Order (No. 1) 1906 Provisional Order to enable the Urban District Council for the Borough of Hove to put in force the Compulsory Clauses of the Lands Clauses Acts.	
	Hove Order (No. 2) 1906 Provisional Order to enable the Urban District Council for the Borough of Hove to put in force the Compulsory Clauses of the Lands Clauses Acts.	
	Nantwich Order 1906 Provisional Order to enable the Urban District Council of Nantwich to put in force the Compulsory Clauses of the Lands Clauses Acts.	
	Oystermouth Order 1906 Provisional Order to enable the Urban District Council of Oystermouth to put in force the Compulsory Clauses of the Lands Clauses Acts.	
	Tamworth Rural Order 1906 Provisional Order to enable the Rural District Council of Tamworth to put in force the Compulsory Clauses of the Lands Clauses Acts.	
Local Government Board's Provisional Orders Confirmation (No. 2) Act 1906	6 Edw. 7. c. ci	20 July 1906
An Act to confirm certain Provisional Orders of the Local Government Board relating to Ashton-in-Makerfield Cardigan Darlington Hoylake and West Kirby Plymouth Salford Sutton in Ashfield Totnes and Tyldesley with Shakerley.
	Ashton-in-Makerfield Order 1906 Provisional Order for altering the Ashton-in-Makerfield Local Board Act 1875. (Note: Ashton-in-Makerfield Local Board Act 1875 (38 & 39 Vict. c. xxxviii))	
	Cardigan Order 1906 Provisional Order for altering the Cardigan Markets and Improvement Act 1857 (Note: Cardigan Markets and Improvement Act 1857 (20 & 21 Vict. c. xxxviii)) and a Confirming Act. (Note: Local Government Board's Provisional Orders Confirmation (Abingdon, &c.) Act 1880 (43 & 44 Vict. c. xxxvi.)	
	Darlington Order 1906 Provisional Order for altering the Darlington Extension and Improvement Act 1872. (Note: Darlington Extension and Improvement Act 1872 (35 & 36 Vict. c. cxii))	
	Hoylake and West Kirby Order 1906 Provisional Order for altering the Hoylake and West Kirby Improvement Acts 1897 (Note: Hoylake and West Kirby Improvement Act 1897 (60 & 61 Vict. c. ci)) and 1900. (Note: Hoylake and West Kirby Improvement Act 1900 (63 & 64 Vict. c. lxxix))	
	Plymouth Order 1906 Provisional Order for altering the Plymouth Corporation Act 1898 (Note: Plymouth Corporation Act 1898 (61 & 62 Vict. c. cxxxix)) and a Confirming Act. (Note: Local Government Board's Provisional Orders Confirmation (No. 4) Act 1905 (5 Edw. 7. c. lxxi))	
	Salford Order 1906 Provisional Order for altering the Salford Improvement Act 1862 (Note: Salford Improvement Act 1862 (25 & 26 Vict. c. ccv)) the Salford Tramways and Improvement Act 1875 (Note: Salford Tramways and Improvement Act 1875 (38 & 39 Vict. c. ci)) the Salford Corporation Act 1902 (Note: Salford Corporation Act 1902 (2 Edw. 7. c. cxlviii)) and a Confirming Act. (Note: Local Government Board's Provisional Order Confirmation (No. 8) Act 1882 (45 & 46 Vict. c. xcvii))	
	Sutton in Ashfield Order 1906 Provisional Order for the alteration of the Sutton in Ashfield Local Board Gas Act 1878. (Note: Sutton-in-Ashfield Local Board Gas Act 1878 (41 & 42 Vict. c. clxxii))	
	Totnes Order 1906 Provisional Order for altering a Local Act of the 8th and 9th years of Queen Victoria Chapter CXXXIV. (Note: (8 & 9 Vict. c. cxxxiv))	
	Tyldesley with Shakerley Order 1906 Provisional Order for altering the Tyldesley with Shakerley Local Board (Gas) Act 1885. (Note: Tyldesley with Shakerley Local Board (Gas) Act 1865 (28 & 29 Vict. c. xxxv))	
Local Government Board's Provisional Orders (No. 3) Act 1906	6 Edw. 7. c. cii	20 July 1906
An Act to confirm certain Provisional Orders of the Local Government Board relating to the Brighouse the Guisborough and the Hemel Hempstead Joint Hospital Districts.
	Brighouse Joint Hospital Order 1906 Provisional Order for altering a Confirming Act. (Note: Local Government Board's Provisional Orders Confirmation (No. 10) Act 1893 (56 & 57 Vict. c. cxix))	
	Guisborough Joint Smallpox Hospital Order 1906 Provisional Order for forming a United District under Section 279 of the Public Health Act 1875. (Note: Public Health Act 1875 (38 & 39 Vict. c. 55))	
	Hemel Hempstead Joint Hospital Order 1906 Provisional Order for forming a United District under Section 279 of the Public Health Act 1875.	
Local Government Board's Provisional Orders Confirmation (No. 4) Act 1906	6 Edw. 7. c. ciii	20 July 1906
An Act to confirm certain Provisional Orders of the Local Government Board relating to Belper (Rural) Blaby (Rural) Ealing Harrogate Ilfracombe and Runcorn.
	Belper Rural Order 1906 Provisional Order to enable the Rural District Council of Belper to put in force the Compulsory Clauses of the Lands Clauses Acts.	
	Blaby Rural Order 1906 Provisional Order to enable the Rural District Council of Blaby to put in force the Compulsory Clauses of the Lands Clauses Acts.	
	Ealing Order 1906 Provisional Order to enable the Urban District Council for the Borough of Ealing to put in force the Compulsory Clauses of the Lands Clauses Acts.	
	Harrogate Order 1906 Provisional Order for altering the Harrogate Improvement Act 1841 (Note: Harrogate Improvement Act 1841 (4 & 5 Vict. c. xvi)) the Harrogate Corporation Act 1893 (Note: Harrogate Corporation Act 1893 (56 & 57 Vict. c. ccix)) and a Confirming Act. (Note: Local Government (No. 6) Act 1868 (31 & 32 Vict. c. cliii))	
	Ilfracombe Order 1906 Provisional Order for altering the Ilfracombe Improvement Act 1900 (Note: Ilfracombe Improvement Act 1900 (63 & 64 Vict. c. ccxiii)) and the Ilfracombe Harbour and Improvement Act 1905. (Note: Ilfracombe Harbour and Improvement Act 1905 (5 Edw. 7. c. xxxix))	
	Runcorn Order 1906 Provisional Order for the alteration of the Runcorn Commissioners Act 1893. (Note: Runcorn Commissioners Act 1893 (56 & 57 Vict. c. clvi))	
Local Government Board's Provisional Orders Confirmation (No. 5) Act 1906	6 Edw. 7. c. civ	20 July 1906
An Act to confirm certain Provisional Orders of the Local Government Board relating to Beckenham Oswaldtwistle Rochdale Rochford (Rural) and Warrington.
	Beckenham Order 1906 Provisional Order for altering the Beckenham Urban District Council Act 1903. (Note: Beckenham Urban District Council Act 1903 (3 Edw. 7. c. ccxvii))	
	Oswaldtwhistle Order 1906 Provisional Order to enable the Urban District Council of Oswaldtwistle to put in force the Compulsory Clauses of the Lands Clauses Acts.	
	Rochdale Order 1906 Provisional Order for partially repealing and altering the Rochdale Improvement Act 1872 (Note: Rochdale Improvement Act 1872 (35 & 36 Vict. c. cxlix)) and a Confirming Act. (Note: Local Government Board's Provisional Orders Confirmation (No. 6) Act 1882 (45 & 46 Vict. c. lxiii))	
	Rochford Rural Order 1906 Provisional Order to enable the Rural District Council of Rochford to put in force the Compulsory Clauses of the Lands Clauses Acts.	
	Warrington Order 1906 Provisional Order to enable the Urban Sanitary Authority for the Borough of Warrington to put in force the Compulsory Clauses of the Lands Clauses Acts.	
Local Government Board's Provisional Order Confirmation (No. 6) Act 1906 (repealed)	6 Edw. 7. c. cv	20 July 1906
An Act to confirm a Provisional Order of the Local Government Board relating to Smethwick. (Repealed by Warley Corporation Act 1969 (c. liv))
	County Borough of Smethwick Order 1906 Provisional Order made in pursuance of Sections 54 and 59 of the Local Government Act 1888. (Note: Local Government Act 1888 (51 & 52 Vict. c. 41))	
Local Government Board's Provisional Orders Confirmation (No. 7) Act 1906	6 Edw. 7. c. cvi	20 July 1906
An Act to confirm certain Provisional Orders of the Local Government Board relating to Carnarvon Sheffield the South West Gloucestershire United Districts and Whitby.
	Carnarvon Order 1906 Provisional Order for altering the Carnarvon Consumers Gas Act 1872. (Note: Carnarvon Consumers Gas Act 1872 (35 & 36 Vict. c. li))	
	Sheffield Order 1906 Provisional Order for altering the Sheffield Corporation Act 1900 (Note: Sheffield Corporation Act 1900 (63 & 64 Vict. c. ccxxii)) and the Sheffield Corporation Act 1903. (Note: Sheffield Corporation Act 1903 (3 Edw. 7. c. cclv))	
	South West Gloucestershire United Districts (Medical Officer of Health) Order 1906 Provisional Order for Union of Districts under Section 286 of the Public Health Act 1875.	
	Whitby Order 1906 Provisional Order for altering the Local Act 7 William IV. Chapter X. (Note: Whitby (Yorkshire) Improvement Act 1837 (7 Will. 4 & 1 Vict. c. x)) the Local Government Board's Provisional Orders Confirmation Act 1874 (No. 3) (Note: Local Government Board's Provisional Orders Confirmation Act 1874 (No. 3) (37 & 38 Vict. c. lxxxix)) and the Whitby Urban District Council Act 1905. (Note: Whitby Urban District Council Act 1905 (5 Edw. 7. c. cxxxv))	
Local Government Board's Provisional Order Confirmation (Poor Law) Act 1906	6 Edw. 7. c. cvii	20 July 1906
An Act to confirm a Provisional Order of the Local Government Board relating to the Bury Saint Edmunds Incorporation.
	Bury Saint Edmund's Order 1906 Provisional Order for repealing a Local Act of the 21st year of King George II. Chapter 21. (Note: Bury Saint Edmunds (Poor Relief) Act 1747 (21 Geo. 2. c. 21))	
Local Government Board (Ireland) Provisional Orders Confirmation (No. 2) Act 1906	6 Edw. 7. c. cviii	20 July 1906
An Act to confirm certain Provisional Orders of the Local Government Board for Ireland relating to Birr Dungarvan Londonderry Trim and Tuam (Rural).
	Birr Order 1906 Provisional Order to enable the Council of the Urban District of Birr to put in force the Compulsory Clauses of the Lands Clauses Acts.	
	Dungarvan Order 1906 Provisional Order to enable the Council of the Urban District of Dungarvan to put in force the Compulsory Clauses of the Lands Clauses Acts.	
	Londonderry Order 1906 Provisional Order to enable the Corporation of Londonderry to put in force the Compulsory Clauses of the Lands Clauses Acts.	
	Trim Order 1906 Provisional Order to enable the Council of the Urban District of Trim to put in force the Compulsory Clauses of the Lands Clauses Acts.	
	Tuam Order 1906 Provisional Order to enable the Council of the Rural District of Tuam to put in force the Compulsory Clauses of the Lands Clauses Acts.	
Local Government Board (Ireland) Provisional Orders Confirmation (No. 3) Act 1906	6 Edw. 7. c. cix	20 July 1906
An Act to confirm certain Provisional Orders of the Local Government Board for Ireland relating to Dublin and Armagh.
	Dublin (Fairview Slob Lands) Order 1906 Provisional Order to enable the Corporation of Dublin to put in force the Compulsory Clauses of the Lands Clauses Acts.	
	Armagh Order 1906 Provisional Order to enable the Urban District Council of Armagh to put in force the Compulsory Clauses of the Lands Clauses Acts.	
Electric Lighting Orders Confirmation (No. 5) Act 1906	6 Edw. 7. c. cx	20 July 1906
An Act to confirm certain Provisional Orders made by the Board of Trade under the Electric Lighting Acts 1882 and 1888 relating to Bude Camberley and District East Barnet Valley Exeter (Extension) Frome (Amendment) Higham Ferrers Rushden and Wellingborough (Rural District) Mid-Durham Wealdstone Wisbech (Amendment) and Yardley (Amendment).
	Bude Electric Lighting Order 1906 Provisional Order granted by the Board of Trade under the Electric Lighting Acts 1882 and 1888 to Messrs. Christy Brothers and Middleton in respect of the Urban District of Stratton and Bude and parts of the Rural District of Stratton in the County of Cornwall.	
	Camberley and District Electric Lighting Order 1906 Provisional Order granted by the Board of Trade under the Electric Lighting Acts 1882 and 1888 to the Camberley Electric Supply Company Limited in respect of the Urban District of Frimley in the County of Surrey and the Parishes of Sandhurst and Crowthorne in the Rural District of Easthampstead in the County of Berkshire.	
	East Barnet Valley Electric Lighting Order 1906 Provisional Order granted by the Board of Trade under the Electric Lighting Acts 1882 and 1888 to the North Metropolitan Electrical Power Distribution Company Limited in respect of the Urban District of East Barnet Valley.	
	Exeter Electric Lighting (Extension) Order 1906 Provisional Order granted by the Board of Trade under the Electric Lighting Acts 1882 and 1888 to the Mayor Aldermen and Citizens of the City of Exeter in respect of the City of Exeter and the Urban District of Heavitree in the County of Devon.	
	Frome Electric Lighting Order 1906 Provisional Order granted by the Board of Trade under the Electric Lighting Acts 1882 and 1888 to the Urban District Council of Frome for the amendment of the Frome Electric Lighting Order 1901.	
	Higham Ferrers, Rushden and Wellingborough (Rural District) Electric Lighting Order 1906 Provisional Order granted by the Board of Trade under the Electric Lighting Acts and 1888 to the County of Northampton Electric Power and Traction Company Limited in respect of the Borough of Higham Ferrers the Urban District of Rushden and the Rural District of Wellingborough all in the County of Northampton.	
	Mid-Durham Electric Lighting Order 1906 Provisional Order granted by the Board of Trade under the Electric Lighting Acts 1882 and 1888 to the County of Durham Electrical Power Distribution Company Limited in respect of the Urban Districts of Crook Willington Brandon and Byshottles and so much of the Rural District of Durham as is contained in the parish or township of Brancepeth all in the County of Durham.	
	Wealdstone Electric Lighting Order 1906 Provisional Order granted by the Board of Trade under the Electric Lighting Acts 1882 and 1888 to the North Metropolitan Electrical Power Distribution Company Limited in respect of the Urban District of Wealdstone.	
	Wisbech Corporation Electric Lighting Order 1906 Provisional Order granted by the Board of Trade under the Electric Lighting Acts 1882 and 1888 to the Mayor Aldermen and Burgesses of the Borough of Wisbech for the amendment of the Wisbech Corporation Electric Lighting Order 1901.	
	Yardley Rural District Electric Lighting Order 1904 (Amendment) Order 1906 Provisional Order granted by the Bourd of Trade under the Electric Lighting Acts 1882 and 1888 to the Rural District Council of Yardley for the amendment of the Yardley Rural District Electric Lighting Order 1904.	
Electric Lighting Orders Confirmation (No. 6) Act 1906 (repealed)	6 Edw. 7. c. cxi	20 July 1906
An Act to confirm certain Provisional Orders made by the Board of Trade under the Electric Lighting Acts 1882 and 1888 the Electric Lighting (Scotland) Act 1890 (Note: Electric Lighting (Scotland) Act 1890 (53 & 54 Vict. c. 13)) and the Electric Lighting (Scotland) Act 1902 (Note: Electric Lighting (Scotland) Act 1902 (2 Edw. 7. c. 35)) relating to Eastwood and Cathcart and Kilpatrick. (Repealed by South of Scotland Electricity Order Confirmation Act 1956 (4 & 5 Eliz. 2. c. xciv))
	Eastwood and Cathcart Electric Lighting Order 1906 Provisional Order granted by the Board of Trade under the Electric Lighting Acts 1882 and 1888 the Electric Lighting (Scotland) Act 1890 and the Electric Lighting (Scotland) Act 1902 to the Strathclyde Electricity Supply Company Limited in respect of portions of the Parishes of Eastwood and Cathcart in the County of Renfrew.	
	Kilpatrick Electric Lighting Order 1906 Provisional Order granted by the Board of Trade under the Electric Lighting Acts 1882 and 1888 the Electric Lighting (Scotland) Act 1890 and the Electric Lighting (Scotland) Act 1902 to the Strathclyde Electricity Supply Company Limited in respect of portions of the Parishes of Old and New Kilpatrick in the County of Dunbarton and of the Parish of Renfrew in the County of Renfrew.	
Sea Fisheries Provisional Order Confirmation Act 1906	6 Edw. 7. c. cxii	20 July 1906
An Act to confirm a Provisional Order made by the Board of Agriculture and Fisheries under the Sea Fisheries Act 1868 (Note: Sea Fisheries Act 1868 (31 & 32 Vict. c. 45)) relating to the Estuary of the Wash in the County of Norfolk.
	Lynn Fishery Order 1906 Order for the Establishment and Maintenance by the Corporation of King's Lynn of a Several Mussel Fishery on the East side of the Estuary of the Wash in the County of Norfolk.	
Pier and Harbour Orders Confirmation (No. 1) Act 1906	6 Edw. 7. c. cxiii	20 July 1906
An Act to confirm certain Provisional Orders made by the Board of Trade under the General Pier and Harbour Act 1861 (Note: General Pier and Harbour Act 1861 (24 & 25 Vict. c. 45)) relating to Brixham Newlyn and Torquay.
	Brixham Harbour Order 1906 Provisional Order to authorise the Brixham Urban District Council to levy rates on passengers and to amend the Acts and Orders relating to Brixham Harbour.	
	Newlyn Pier and Harbour Order 1906 Provisional Order for the management and maintenance of the Pier and Harbour of Newlyn in the County of Cornwall for the construction of new works in connection therewith for repealing the Newlyn Pier and Harbour Orders 1866 to 1892 and for other purposes.	
	Torquay Harbour Order 1906 Provisional Order for amending the Torquay Harbour Orders 1888 and 1892 and for other purposes.	
Pier and Harbour Orders Confirmation (No. 2) Act 1906	6 Edw. 7. c. cxiv	20 July 1906
An Act to confirm certain Provisional Orders made by the Board of Trade under the General Pier and Harbour Act 1861 relating to Locb Claish (Loch Inchard) and Dunoon.
	Loch Claish Pier Order 1906 Provisional Order for the Maintenance and Regulation of Loch Claish Pier in the County of Sutherland and the Construction of New Works and for authorising the levying of rates at the said pier.	
	Dunoon Burgh Harbour Order 1906 Provisional Order to authorise the Provost Magistrates and Councillors of the Burgh of Dunoon to construct and maintain a new Harbour at Dunoon in the County of Argyll and to authorise the levying of rates and for other purposes.	
Pier and Harbour Order Confirmation (No. 3) Act 1906	6 Edw. 7. c. cxv	20 July 1906
An Act to confirm a Provisional Order made by the Board of Trade under the General Pier and Harbour Act 1861 relating to Burnham in the county of Somerset.
	Burnham (Somerset) Pier Order 1906 Provisional Order for the construction maintenance and regulation of a Pier at Burnham in the County of Somerset.	
Education Board Provisional Orders Confirmation (Devon, &c.) Act 1906	6 Edw. 7. c. cxvi	20 July 1906
An Act to confirm certain Provisional Orders made by the Board of Education under the Education Acts 1870 to 1903 to enable the Councils of the Administrative Counties of Devon and the West Riding of Yorkshire to put in force the Lands Clauses Acts.
	Devon County Council Order 1906 Provisional Order for putting in force the Lands Clauses Acts.	
	Yorkshire West Riding County Council Order 1906 Provisional Order for putting in force the Lands Clauses Acts.	
Education Board Provisional Orders Confirmation (Kesteven, &c.) Act 1906	6 Edw. 7. c. cxvii	20 July 1906
An Act to confirm certain Provisional Orders made by the Board of Education under the Education Acts 1870 to 1903 to enable the Councils of the Administrative Counties of the Parts of Kesteven Surrey and Warwick and the Municipal Borough of Ealing to put in force the Lands Clauses Acts.
	Lincolnshire (Parts of Kesteven) County Council Order 1906 Provisional Order for putting in force the Lands Clauses Acts.	
	Surrey County Council Order 1906 Provisional Order for putting in force the Lands Clauses Acts.	
	Warwickshire County Council Order 1906 Provisional Order for putting in force the Lands Clauses Acts.	
	Ealing Borough Council Order 1906 Provisional Order for putting in force the Lands Clauses Acts.	
Post Office (Sites) Act 1906 (repealed)	6 Edw. 7. c. cxviii	4 August 1906
An Act to enable His Majesty's Postmaster-General to acquire lands in London Birmingham Blackburn Bromley Torquay Carnforth and Walton-on-Thames for the Public Service and for other purposes. (Repealed by Postal Services Act 2000 (Consequential Modifications to Local Enactments) Order 2003 (SI 2003/1542))
Dean Forest Act 1906	6 Edw. 7. c. cxix	4 August 1906
An Act to authorise the exchange of parcels of waste in the Forest of Dean and to amend the Dean Forest (Mines) Act 1904. (Note: Dean Forest (Mines) Act 1904 (4 Edw. 7. c. clvi))
Local Government Board's Provisional Orders Confirmation (No. 8) Act 1906	6 Edw. 7. c. cxx	4 August 1906
An Act to confirm certain Provisional Orders of the Local Government Board relating to Liverpool and the Counties of Bedford Buckingham and Hertford.
	Liverpool Order 1906 Provisional Order made in pursuance of Sections 59 and 87 of the Local Government Act 1888 for altering the City of Liverpool Order 1895 the Liverpool (Extension) Order 1902 and the Liverpool (Extension) Order 1905.	
	Counties of Bedford and Hertford (Alteration of Boundaries) Order 1906 Provisional Order made in pursuance of Section 54 of the Local Government Act 1888 for altering the Boundary between Counties.	
	Counties of Buckingham and Hertford (Alteration of Boundaries) Order 1906 Provisional Order made in pursuance of Section 54 of the Local Government Act 1888 for altering the Boundary between and Counties.	
Local Government Board's Provisional Orders Confirmation (No. 9) Act 1906	6 Edw. 7. c. cxxi	4 August 1906
An Act to confirm certain Provisional Orders of the Local Government Board relating to Cuckfield (Rural) and Leek.
	Cuckfield Rural Order 1906 Provisional Order for altering the Mid-Sussex Water Act 1890. (Note: Mid-Sussex Water Act 1890 (53 & 54 Vict. c. lxv))	
	Leek Order 1906 Provisional Order for altering the Leek Improvement Act 1855. (Note: Leek Improvement Act 1855 (18 & 19 Vict. c. cxxxii))	
Local Government Board's Provisional Order Confirmation (No. 10) Act 1906	6 Edw. 7. c. cxxii	4 August 1906
An Act to confirm a Provisional Order of the Local Government Board relating to the Port of Manchester.
	Manchester Port Order 1906 Provisional Order for altering a Confirming Act. (Note: Local Government Board's Provisional Order Confirmation (Port) Act 1901 (1 Edw. 7. c. clxx))	
Local Government Board's Provisional Orders Confirmation (No. 11) Act 1906	6 Edw. 7. c. cxxiii	4 August 1906
An Act to confirm certain Provisional Orders of the Local Government Board relating to Lincoln and Uttoxeter.
	Lincoln Order 1906 Provisional Order for altering the Lincoln Waterworks Act 1871 (Note: Lincoln Waterworks Act 1871 (34 & 35 Vict. c. cxlix)) and the Local Government Board's Provisional Orders Confirmation (Aberavon &c.) Act 1880. (Note: Local Government Board's Provisional Orders Confirmation (Aberavon &c.) Act 1880 (43 & 44 Vict. c. lxxxvi))	
	Uttoxeter Order 1906 Provisional Order for altering the Uttoxeter Water Act 1892. (Note: Uttoxeter Water Act 1892 (55 & 56 Vict. c. clxxxix))	
Local Government Board's Provisional Order Confirmation (Housing of Working Classes) Act 1906	6 Edw. 7. c. cxxiv	4 August 1906
An Act to confirm a Provisional Order of the Local Government Board relating to the Metropolitan Borough of Saint Pancras.
	St. Pancras (Chapel Grove and Eastnor Place) Order 1906 Order for sanctioning Schemes for Reconstruction under Part II. of the Housing of the Working Classes Act 1890. (Note: Housing of the Working Classes Act 1890 (53 & 54 Vict. c. 70))	
London Government Act Adjustment Schemes Confirmation Act 1906	6 Edw. 7. c. cxxv	4 August 1906
An Act to confirm certain Schemes made under the London Government Act 1899 (Note: London Government Act 1899 (62 & 63 Vict. c. 14)) relating to the County of London and Penge the County of London and Hornsey the County of London and Barnes and the Counties of London and Kent.
	London and Penge (Adjustment) Scheme 1906 The London and Penge (Adjustment) Scheme 1906.	
	London and Hornsey (Adjustment) Scheme 1906 The London and Hornsey (Adjustment) Scheme 1906.	
	London and Barnes (Adjustment) Scheme 1906 The London and Barnes (Adjustment) Scheme 1906.	
	London and Kent (Adjustment) Scheme 1906 The London and Kent (Adjustment) Scheme 1906.	
Education Board Provisional Order Confirmation (London No. 1) Act 1906	6 Edw. 7. c. cxxvi	4 August 1906
An Act to confirm a Provisional Order made by the Board of Education under the Education Acts 1870 to 1903 to enable the London County Council to put in force the Lands Clauses Acts.
	London County Council (No. 1) Order 1906 Provisional Order (No. 1) for putting in force the Lands Clauses Acts.	
Paisley Gas and Water Order Confirmation Act 1906	6 Edw. 7. c. cxxvii	4 August 1906
An Act to confirm a Provisional Order under the Burgh Police (Scotland) Act 1892 (Note: Burgh Police (Scotland) Act 1892 (55 & 56 Vict. c. 55)) relating to Paisley Gas and Water.
	Paisley Gas and Water Order 1906 Paisley Gas and Water. Provisional Order.	
Electric Lighting Orders Confirmation (No. 3) Act 1906 (repealed)	6 Edw. 7. c. cxxviii	4 August 1906
An Act to confirm certain Provisional Orders made by the Board of Trade under the Electric Lighting Acts 1882 and 1888 the Electric Lighting (Scotland) Act 1890 and the Electric Lighting (Scotland) Act 1902 relating to Bellshill Blantye Bothwell Dunfermline and District Dunoon Fochabers Inveresk Shettleston and Tollcross and Uddingston. (Repealed by North of Scotland Electricity Order Confirmation Act 1958 (7 & 8 Eliz. 2. c. ii))
Electric Lighting Orders Confirmation (No. 4) Act 1906	6 Edw. 7. c. cxxix	4 August 1906
An Act to confirm certain Provisional Orders made by the Board of Trade under the Electric Lighting Acts 1882 and 1888 relating to Aylesbury Boston Castle Ward Weetslade and Cramlington Godalming (Extension) Gomersal Henley-on-Thames Pinner Stanmore Harrow Weald and Edgware Ryton and Swanage.
	Aylesbury Electric Lighting Order 1906	
	Boston Electric Lighting Order 1906	
	Castle Ward, Weetslade and Cramlington Electric Lighting Order 1906	
	Godalming (Extension) Electric Lighting Order 1906	
	Gomersal Electric Lighting Order 1906	
	Henley-on-Thames Electric Lighting Order 1906	
	Pinner, Stanmore, Harrow Weald and Edgware Electric Lighting Order 1906	
	Ryton Electric Lighting Order 1906	
	Swanage Electric Lighting Order 1906	
Electric Lighting Orders Confirmation (No. 7) Act 1906	6 Edw. 7. c. cxxx	4 August 1906
An Act to confirm certain Provisional Orders made by the Board of Trade under the Electric Lighting Acts 1882 and 1888 relating to Barton-upon-Irwell Cheshunt Dorchester (Amendment) Eton (Rural) Hexham (Extension) Stourport and Kidderminster and Uxbridge and District (Extension).
	Barton-upon-Irwell Rural District Electric Lighting Order 1906	
	Cheshunt Electric Lighting Order 1906	
	Dorchester Electric Lighting Order 1901 (Amendment) Order 1906	
	Eton (Rural) Electric Lighting Order 1906	
	Hexham Electric Lighting (Extension) Order 1906	
	Stourport and Kidderminster Electric Lighting Order 1906	
	Uxbridge and District Electricity Supply (Extension) Order 1906	
Gas and Water Orders Confirmation Act 1906	6 Edw. 7. c. cxxxi	4 August 1906
An Act to confirm certain Provisional Orders made by the Board of Trade under the Gas and Water Works Facilities Act 1870 (Note: Gas and Water Works Facilities Act 1870 (33 & 34 Vict. c. 70)) relating to Bolsover and District Water Great Grimsby Gas Great Grimsby Water Hoylake and West Kirby Water Wath upon Dearne and District Gas and Wollaston Gas.
	Bolsover and District Water Order 1906	
	Great Grimsby Gas Order 1906	
	Great Grimsby Water Order 1906	
	Hoylake and West Kirby Water Order 1906	
	Wath upon Dearne and District Gas Order 1906	
	Wollaston Gas Order 1906	
Gas Orders Confirmation (No. 1) Act 1906	6 Edw. 7. c. cxxxii	4 August 1906
An Act to confirm certain Provisional Orders made by the Board of Trade under the Gas and Water Works Facilities Act 1870 relating to Charing Gas Chichester Gas Corsham Gas Farnham Gas and King's Lynn Gas.
	Charing Gas Order 1906	
	Chichester Gas Order 1906	
	Corsham Gas Order 1906	
	Farnham Gas Order 1906	
	King's Lynn Gas Order 1906	
Gas Orders Confirmation (No. 2) Act 1906	6 Edw. 7. c. cxxxiii	4 August 1906
An Act to confirm certain Provisional Orders made by the Board of Trade under the Gas and Water Works Facilities Act 1870 relating to Newport Pagnell Gas Pontardulais Gas Raunds Gas Redditch Gas and Saint Austell Gas.
	Newport Pagnell Gas Order 1906	
	Pontardulais Gas Order 1906	
	Raunds Gas Order 1906	
	Redditch Gas Order 1906	
	St. Austell Gas Order 1906	
Tramways Orders Confirmation Act 1906	6 Edw. 7. c. cxxxiv	4 August 1906
An Act to confirm certain Provisional Orders made by the Board of Trade under the Tramways Act 1870 (Note: Tramways Act 1870 (33 & 34 Vict. c. 78)) relating to Altrincham Urban District Council Tramways Dewsbury Corporation Tramways Newcastle-upon-Tyne Corporation Tramways Ossett Corporation Tramways Portobello and Musselburgh Tramways (Port Seton Extension) and Rochdale Corporation Tramways.
	Altrincham Urban District Council Tramways Order 1906	
	Dewsbury Corporation Tramways Order 1906	
	Newcastle-upon-Tyne Corporation Tramways Order 1906	
	Ossett Corporation Tramways Order 1906	
	Portobello and Musselburgh Tramways (Port Seton Extension) Tramways Order 1906	
	Rochdale Corporation Tramways Order 1906	
Glasgow and South Western Railway Order Confirmation Act 1906	6 Edw. 7. c. cxxxv	4 August 1906
An Act to confirm a Provisional Order under the Private Legislation Procedure (Scotland) Act 1899 relating to the Glasgow and South Western Railway.
	Glasgow and South Western Railway Order 1906	
Water Orders Confirmation Act 1906	6 Edw. 7. c. cxxxvi	4 August 1906
An Act to confirm certain Provisional Orders made by the Board of Trade under the Gas and Water Works Facilities Act 1870 relating to Heme Bay Water Maidstone Water Mid-Kent Water Rickmansworth and Uxbridge Valley Water Sleaford and District Water and Slough Water.
	Herne Water Order 1906	
	Maidstone Water Order 1906	
	Mid-Kent Water Order 1906	
	Rickmansworth and Uxbridge Valley Water Order 1906	
	Sleaford and District Water Order 1906	
	Slough Water Order 1906	
Newburgh and North Fife Railway (Extension of Time) Order Confirmation Act 1906	6 Edw. 7. c. cxxxvii	4 August 1906
An Act to confirm a Provisional Order under the Private Legislation Procedure (Scotland) Act 1899 relating to the Newburgh and North Fife Railway.
	Newburgh and North Fife Railway (Extension of Time) Order 1906	
Paisley Roads Order Confirmation Act 1906	6 Edw. 7. c. cxxxviii	4 August 1906
An Act to confirm a Provisional Order under the Private Legislation Procedure (Scotland) Act 1899 relating to Paisley Roads.
	Paisley Roads Order 1906	
Inverclyde Bequest Order Confirmation Act 1906	6 Edw. 7. c. cxxxix	4 August 1906
An Act to confirm a Provisional Order under the Private Legislation Procedure (Scotland) Act 1899 relating to the Inverclyde Bequest.
	Inverclyde Bequest Order 1906	
Perth Corporation Gas Order Confirmation Act 1906	6 Edw. 7. c. cxl	4 August 1906
An Act to confirm a Provisional Order under the Private Legislation Procedure (Scotland) Act 1899 relating to Perth Corporation Gas.
	Perth Corporation Gas Order 1906	
Local Government Board's Provisional Orders Confirmation (Gas) Act 1906	6 Edw. 7. c. cxli	4 August 1906
An Act to confirm certain Provisional Orders of the Local Government Board relating to Arlecdon and Frizington Liverpool and Marsden.
	Arlecdon and Frizington Gas Order 1906	
	Liverpool Corporation (Fazakerley) Gas Order 1906	
	Marsden Gas Order 1906	
Rutherglen Burgh Order Confirmation Act 1906	6 Edw. 7. c. cxlii	4 August 1906
An Act to confirm a Provisional Order under the Private Legislation Procedure (Scotland) Act 1899 relating to Rutherglen Burgh.
	Rutherglen Burgh Order 1906	
Wolstanton United Urban District Council Gas Act 1906	6 Edw. 7. c. cxliii	4 August 1906
An Act to empower the urban district council of the Wolstanton United Urban District to manufacture and supply gas and to provide for the transfer to the Council of the works premises and business of the Chesterton Gaslight Company Limited and of so much of the mains pipes and other works of the corporation of Burslem and of the corporation of Newcastle-under-Lyme respectively as are within the Wolstanton United Urban District and for other purposes.
Great Northern Railway Act 1906	6 Edw. 7. c. cxliv	4 August 1906
An Act to empower the Great Northern Railway Company to construct a railway and other works and to purchase additional lands to extend the time for the completion of works and compulsory purchase of lands by the Company to authorise the Company to contribute to the cost of the generating station of the Great Northern and City Railway Company and to raise additional capital to authorise the construction of a railway and works by the Company and the Great Central Railway Company and to confirm the purchase of lands by those companies to authorise the construction of a railway and works by the South Yorkshire Joint Line Committee to extend the time for the completion of works and the compulsory purchase of lands by the Cheshire Lines Committee and for other purposes.
London, Brighton and South Coast Railway Act 1906	6 Edw. 7. c. cxlv	4 August 1906
An Act to confer further powers on the London Brighton and South Coast Railway Company and for other purposes.
Ascot District Gas and Electricity Act 1906	6 Edw. 7. c. cxlvi	4 August 1906
An Act to empower the Ascot District Gas Company to supply electricity and to confer further powers on and to change the name of the Company.
Derbyshire and Nottinghamshire Electric Power Act 1906	6 Edw. 7. c. cxlvii	4 August 1906
An Act to alter and regulate the capital and borrowing powers of the Derbyshire and Nottinghamshire Electric Power Company and for other purposes.
Borough of Portsmouth Waterworks Act 1906	6 Edw. 7. c. cxlviii	4 August 1906
An Act to confer further powers upon the Borough of Portsmouth Waterworks Company with respect to the raising of money and for other purposes.
West Yorkshire Tramways Act 1906 (repealed)	6 Edw. 7. c. cxlix	4 August 1906
An Act to incorporate the West Yorkshire Tramways Company and to empower that Company to make and maintain tramways tramroads and other works and for other purposes. (Repealed by West Yorkshire Act 1980 (c. xiv))
London County Council (General Powers) Act 1906	6 Edw. 7. c. cl	4 August 1906
An Act to empower the London County Council to execute works and to acquire lands to make provisions as to the drainage of parts of the borough of Hornsey to confer powers upon the councils of certain metropolitan boroughs and for other purposes.
London United Tramways Act 1906	6 Edw. 7. c. cli	4 August 1906
An Act for conferring further powers on the London United Tramways (1901) Limited for widening and altering streets and roads and acquiring lands in the counties of Middlesex and Surrey and for other purposes.
Twickenham and Teddington Electric Supply Company Act 1906	6 Edw. 7. c. clii	4 August 1906
An Act to extend the powers of the Twickenham and Teddington Electric Supply Company Limited with respect to the supply of electricity and for other purposes.
Watford Gas Act 1906	6 Edw. 7. c. cliii	4 August 1906
An Act to consolidate the capital of the Watford Gas and Coke Company to confer further powers on the Company with respect to the raising of additional capital to authorise the construction and maintenance of additional gasworks and for other purposes.
Alexandra (Newport and South Wales) Docks and Railway Act 1906	6 Edw. 7. c. cliv	4 August 1906
An Act to empower the Alexandra (Newport and South Wales) Docks and Railway Company to make an entrance channel and lock entrance into their existing South Dock and to construct other works and for other purposes.
Ritz Hotel Limited Act 1906	6 Edw. 7. c. clv	4 August 1906
An Act for enabling the Ritz Hotel Limited to rearrange its capital and to provide for the extinction of its deferred shares and for issuing ordinary shares in lieu thereof and for altering the memorandum and articles of association of the Company and for other purposes.
Wirral Railway Act 1906	6 Edw. 7. c. clvi	4 August 1906
An Act to revive and extend the powers for the purchase of land and the time limited for the completion of the railway authorised by the Wirral Railway Act 1898 (Note: Wirral Railway Act 1898 (61 & 62 Vict. c. lxvii)) to extend the time for the sale of surplus lands of the Wirral Railway Company and for other purposes.
Cardiff Railway Act 1906	6 Edw. 7. c. clvii	4 August 1906
An Act for empowering the Cardiff Railway Company to make a deviation of a portion of Railway No. 4 authorised by the Cardiff Railway Act 1897 (Note: Cardiff Railway Act 1897 (60 & 61 Vict. c. ccvii)) for extending the time for the purchase of certain lands and for the completion of certain railways and for other purposes.
Newcastle-upon-Tyne Electric Supply Company Act 1906	6 Edw. 7. c. clviii	4 August 1906
An Act for transferring to the Newcastle-upon-Tyne Electric Supply Company Limited the undertakings authorised by the Whitley and Monkseaton Electric Lighting Order 1901 and the Seghill Earsdon and Tynemouth (Rural) Electric Lighting Order 1902 and for other purposes.
Baker Street and Waterloo Railway Act 1906	6 Edw. 7. c. clix	4 August 1906
An Act to confer further powers on the Baker Street and Waterloo Railway Company.
Southport and Lytham Tramroad Act 1906	6 Edw. 7. c. clx	4 August 1906
An Act to extend the time for taking certain lands and for the construction of certain authorised works by the Southport and Lytham Tramroad Company and the mayor aldermen and burgesses of the borough of Southport. and for other purposes.
Wallasey Tramways and Improvements Act 1906	6 Edw. 7. c. clxi	4 August 1906
An Act to authorise the Wallasey Urban District Council to construct a tramway and promenades and to make further provision in regard to their gas water electricity and tramways undertakings and the health local government and improvement of their district and for other purposes.
Western Valleys (Monmouthshire) Sewerage Board Act 1906	6 Edw. 7. c. clxii	4 August 1906
An Act to confer further powers on the Western Valleys (Monmouthshire) Sewerage Board to make the Mynyddislwyn Urban District Council a constituent authority and for other purposes.
Edinburgh Corporation Act 1906	6 Edw. 7. c. clxiii	4 August 1906
An Act to authorise the Lord Provost magistrates and council of the city and royal burgh of Edinburgh to make and maintain tramways to construct works and acquire lands to incorporate the Royal (Dick) Veterinary College Edinburgh to provide for the registration of employment agencies to amend the Edinburgh Municipal and Police Acts and for other purposes.
Crediton Gas Act 1906	6 Edw. 7. c. clxiv	4 August 1906
An Act for incorporating, and conferring powers upon the Crediton Gas Company, and for other purposes.
Kent Electric Power Act 1906	6 Edw. 7. c. clxv	4 August 1906
An Act to authorise the Kent Electric Power Company to construct a pier on the River Medway and to extend their powers with respect to the supply of electricity and for other purposes.
Truro Gas Act 1906	6 Edw. 7. c. clxvi	4 August 1906
An Act to incorporate and confer powers upon the Truro Gas Company.
United Railways of the Havana and Regla Warehouses Limited Act 1906	6 Edw. 7. c. clxvii	4 August 1906
An Act to provide for an increase of the share capital of United Railways of the Havana and Regla Warehouses Limited and for other purposes.
Rochester, Chatham and Gillingham Gas Act 1906	6 Edw. 7. c. clxviii	4 August 1906
An Act to confer further powers upon the Rochester Chatham and Strood Gaslight Company.
Folkestone, Sandgate and Hythe Tramways Act 1906	6 Edw. 7. c. clxix	4 August 1906
An Act to incorporate the Folkestone Sandgate and Hythe Tramways Company and to empower that Company to make and maintain tramways and other works, and for other purposes.
South Eastern and London, Chatham and Dover Railways Act 1906	6 Edw. 7. c. clxx	4 August 1906
An Act to confer, further powers on the South Eastern and London Chatham and Dover Railway Companies and the South Eastern and Chatham Railway Companies Managing Committee.
Bacup Corporation Act 1906 (repealed)	6 Edw. 7. c. clxxi	4 August 1906
An Act to extend the time limited by the Bacup Corporation Water Act 1898 (Note: Bacup Corporation Water Act 1898 (61 & 62 Vict. c. clvi)) for the construction of waterworks to confer further powers upon the mayor aldermen and burgesses of the Borough of Bacup in relation to their Water and electricity undertakings and to make further provision with regard to the health local government and improvement of the said borough and for other purposes. (Repealed by County of Lancashire Act 1984 (c. xxi))
Cork City Railways Act 1906	6 Edw. 7. c. clxxii	4 August 1906
An Act to incorporate the Cork City Railways Company and to authorise the Company to construct railways and other works in the county borough of Cork and for other purposes.
Derby Gas Act 1906	6 Edw. 7. c. clxxiii	4 August 1906
An Act for extending the limits of supply of the Derby Gas Light and Coke Company to enable that Company to acquire the undertakings of the Spondon Ockbrook and Borrowash Gas Light and Coke Company Limited and the Mickleover and Etwall Gas Light and Coke Company Limited and for other purposes.
County of Middlesex (General Powers) Act 1906 (repealed)	6 Edw. 7. c. clxxiv	4 August 1906
An Act to make further provision, for preventing the pollution and obstruction of streams in the county, of Middlesex and to confer further powers on the county council of Middlesex for that purpose and in relation to the width and maintenance of roads employment agencies ice-cream vendors gipsy encampments recreation grounds Brentford Market and Runnymede Rifle Range and for other purposes. (Repealed by Middlesex County Council Act 1944 (7 & 8 Geo. 6. c. xxi))
St. John's (Westminster) Improvement Act 1906	6 Edw. 7. c. clxxv	4 August 1906
An Act to authorise the construction of street improvements the rearrangement of buildings and the taking of lands in the parish of St. Margaret and St. John the Evangelist Westminster in the county of London and for other purposes.
Todmorden Corporation Act 1906	6 Edw. 7. c. clxxvi	4 August 1906
An Act to confer further powers upon the mayor aldermen and burgesses of the borough of Todmorden in relation to their water gas and electric lighting undertakings to authorise them to provide and work motor omnibuses and to make further provision with regard to the cleansing and improvement of the River Calder within the borough and with regard to the health improvement and good government of the said borough and for other purposes.
Tottenham and Edmonton Gas Act 1906	6 Edw. 7. c. clxxvii	4 August 1906
An Act to confer further powers upon the Tottenham and Edmonton Gas Light and Coke Company and for other purposes.
Macclesfield and District Tramways Act 1906	6 Edw. 7. c. clxxviii	4 August 1906
An Act to incorporate the Macclesfield and District Tramways Company and to empower that Company to make and maintain tramways and other works in the county of Chester and for other purposes.
Poole Corporation Water Act 1906	6 Edw. 7. c. clxxix	4 August 1906
An Act to authorise the mayor aldermen and burgesses of the borough of Poole to acquire the undertaking of the Poole Waterworks Company to construct additional waterworks and to supply water within the said borough and the neighbourhood thereof and for other purposes.
Corporation of London (Blackfriars and Other Bridges) Act 1906	6 Edw. 7. c. clxxx	4 August 1906
An Act to empower the Corporation of London to widen Blackfriars Bridge to construct a tramway thereover and to confer other powers upon them with respect to that and other bridges to authorise agreements between the Corporation and the London County Council and for other purposes.
London County Council (Tramways and Improvements) Act 1906	6 Edw. 7. c. clxxxi	4 August 1906
An Act to empower the London County Council to construct and work tramways in the county of London and to make street improvements and other works and acquire lands and for other purposes.
County of Durham Electric Power Supply Act 1906	6 Edw. 7. c. clxxxii	4 August 1906
An Act for conferring further powers upon the County of Durham Electric Power Supply Company and for other purposes.
Great Northern (Ireland) and Midland Railways Act 1906	6 Edw. 7. c. clxxxiii	4 August 1906
An Act to provide for the vesting of the undertaking of the Donegal Railway Company in the Midland Railway Company and in a Joint Committee of that Company and the Great Northern Railway Company (Ireland) to incorporate such Joint Committee and to transfer to that committee certain of the powers of the Great Northern Railway Company (Ireland) in connexion with the undertaking of the Strabane and Letterkenny Railway Company and for other purposes.
Nettlebed and District Commons (Preservation) Act 1906	6 Edw. 7. c. clxxxiv	4 August 1906
An Act to incorporate a body of Conservators for the preservation and management as public open spaces of certain commons in the rural district of Henley in the county of Oxford and for other purposes.
Shropshire, Worcestershire and Staffordshire Electric Power Act 1906 (repealed)	6 Edw. 7. c. clxxxv	4 August 1906
An Act to confer further powers upon the Shropshire Worcestershire and Staffordshire Electric Power Company and for other purposes. (Repealed by Shropshire, Worcestershire and Staffordshire Electric Power (Consolidation) Act 1938 (1 & 2 Geo. 6. c. lviii))
Buckhaven, Methil and Innerleven Burgh Extension Act 1906	6 Edw. 7. c. clxxxvi	4 August 1906
An Act to extend the Municipal and Police Boundaries of the Burgh of Buckhaven Methil and Innerleven to authorise the Provost Magistrates and Councillors of the Burgh to construct a new street and for other purposes.
London Squares and Enclosures (Preservation) Act 1906 (repealed)	6 Edw. 7. c. clxxxvii	4 August 1906
An Act for preventing by agreement with the present owners of certain lands in the administrative county of London the future erection of buildings and structures on such lands and for other purposes. (Repealed by Local Law (Greater London Council and Inner London Boroughs) Order 1965 (SI 1965/540))
Sutton District Waterworks Act 1906	6 Edw. 7. c. clxxxviii	4 August 1906
An Act for the preservation of the sources of water supply of the Sutton District Water Company and for other purposes.
Kingston-upon-Hull Corporation Act 1906	6 Edw. 7. c. clxxxix	4 August 1906
An Act to empower the Corporation of Kingston-upon-Hull to lay down additional tramways to execute certain street works and to confer further powers on them in regard to their water and electricity undertakings and the improvement of the city and for other purposes.
Pontefract Corporation Act 1906	6 Edw. 7. c. cxc	4 August 1906
An Act to vest in the Corporation of Pontefract the undertakings of the Pontefract Park Trustees and the Pontefract Gas Company and to make further provision for the local government of the borough and the water supply thereto and for other purposes.
Hackney Electricity Act 1906	6 Edw. 7. c. cxci	4 August 1906
An Act to make further provision in regard to the supply of electrical energy by the mayor aldermen and councillors of the metropolitan borough of Hackney and for other purposes.
Hampstead Garden Suburb Act 1906	6 Edw. 7. c. cxcii	4 August 1906
An Act to confer powers upon the Hampstead Garden Suburb Trust Limited for the purpose of enabling that Company to develop and lay out lands as garden suburbs.
London County Council (Money) Act 1906 (repealed)	6 Edw. 7. c. cxciii	4 August 1906
An Act to regulate the expenditure of money by the London County Council on capital account during the current financial period and the raising of money to meet such expenditure and for other purposes. (Repealed by London County Council (Finance Consolidation) Act 1912 (2 & 3 Geo. 5. c. cv))
North West London Railway Act 1906	6 Edw. 7. c. cxciv	4 August 1906
An Act for empowering the North West London Railway Company to extend their authorised railways and for other purposes.
St. Pancras Electricity Act 1906	6 Edw. 7. c. cxcv	4 August 1906
An Act to empower the mayor aldermen and councillors of the metropolitan borough of St. Pancras to continue and maintain their stations for generating and transforming electricity and to amend the St. Pancras (Middlesex) Electric Lighting Order 1883.
South Lincolnshire Water Act 1906	6 Edw. 7. c. cxcvi	4 August 1906
An Act to incorporate the South Lincolnshire Water Company with power to supply water within certain parishes in the county of Lincoln and to authorise that Company and the Urban District Council of Spalding to construct works and provide water and for other purposes.
South Wales Electrical Power Distribution Company Act 1906	6 Edw. 7. c. cxcvii	4 August 1906
An Act to authorise the South Wales Electrical Power Distribution Company to raise additional capital for carrying out works within the area transferred to and vested in the Company by the South Wales Electrical Power Distribution Company Act 1905 (Note: South Wales Electrical Power Distribution Company Act 1905 (5 Edw. 7. c. xlix)) and for other purposes.
Watford and Edgware Railway Act 1906	6 Edw. 7. c. cxcviii	4 August 1906
An Act to extend the time limited by the Watford and Edgware Railway Act 1903 (Note: Watford and Edgware Railway Act 1903 (3 Edw. 7. c. clxxxix)) for the construction of works and the purchase of lands to authorise agreements between the Watford and Edgware Railway Company and other companies and for other purposes.
Lancashire Electric Power Act 1906	6 Edw. 7. c. cxcix	4 August 1906
An Act to enlarge the powers of the Lancashire Electric Power Company and for other purposes.
Bristol Corporation Act 1906	6 Edw. 7. c. cc	4 August 1906
An Act to empower the lord mayor, aldermen and burgesses of the city of Bristol to acquire lands to alter the wards of the city and for other purposes.
Clydebank and District Water and Burgh Extension Order Confirmation Act 1906	6 Edw. 7. c. cci	29 November 1906
An Act to confirm a Provisional Order under the Private Legislation Procedure (Scotland) Act 1899 relating to Clydebank and District Water and Burgh Extension.
	Clydebank and District Water and Burgh Extension Order 1906	
Blairgowrie, Rattray and District Water Board Order Confirmation Act 1906	6 Edw. 7. c. ccii	29 November 1906
An Act to confirm a Provisional Order under the Private Legislation Procedure (Scotland) Act 1899 relating to Blairgowrie Rattray and District Water.
	Blairgowrie, Rattray and District Water Order 1906	
Edinburgh Corporation (Superannuation) Order Confirmation Act 1906 (repealed)	6 Edw. 7. c. cciii	29 November 1906
An Act to confirm a Provisional Order under the Private Legislation Procedure (Scotland) Act 1899 relating to Edinburgh Corporation (Superannuation). (Repealed by Edinburgh Corporation Order Confirmation Act 1922 (13 Geo. 5. Sess. 2. c. iv))
	Edinburgh Corporation (Superannuation) Order 1906	
Metropolitan Electric Supply Company Act 1906	6 Edw. 7. c. cciv	29 November 1906
An Act to confer further powers on the Metropolitan Electric Supply Company Limited.
Dover Harbour (Works, &c.) Act 1906 (repealed)	6 Edw. 7. c. ccv	29 November 1906
An Act to authorise the construction of certain New Works for improving the Harbour of Dover the abandonment of certain authorised Works by the Dover Harbour Board and for other purposes. (Repealed by Dover Harbour Consolidation Act 1954 (2 & 3 Eliz. 2. c. iv))
Great Northern Railway (Ireland) Act 1906	6 Edw. 7. c. ccvi	29 November 1906
An Act to confer further powers upon the Great Northern Railway Company (Ireland) and to make further provisions with reference to the undertaking of that company to confer further powers upon the Castleblayney Keady and Armagh Railway Company to extend the time limited by the Kingscourt Keady and Armagh Railway Act 1900 (Note: Kingscourt, Keady and Armagh Railway Act 1900 (63 & 64 Vict. c. ccxc)) for the completion of works and the purchase of lands and for other purposes.
Falkirk and District Tramways (Extensions) Order Confirmation Act 1906	6 Edw. 7. c. ccvii	21 December 1906
An Act to confirm a Provisional Order under the Private Legislation Procedure (Scotland) Act 1899 relating to Falkirk and District Tramways.
	Falkirk and District Tramways (Extensions) Order 1906	
Ure Elder Fund Order Confirmation Act 1906	6 Edw. 7. c. ccviii	21 December 1906
An Act to confirm a Provisional Order under the Private Legislation Procedure (Scotland) Act 1899 relating to the Ure Elder Fund.
	Ure Elder Fund Order 1906	
Edinburgh Suburban Electric Tramways Order Confirmation Act 1906	6 Edw. 7. c. ccix	21 December 1906
An Act to confirm a Provisional Order under the Private Legislation Procedure (Scotland) Act 1899 relating to Edinburgh Suburban Electric Tramways.
	Edinburgh Suburban Electric Tramways Order 1906	
Ardrossan, Saltcoats and District Tramways Order Confirmation Act 1906	6 Edw. 7. c. ccx	21 December 1906
An Act to confirm a Provisional Order under the Private Legislation Procedure (Scotland) Act 1899 relating to Ardrossan Saltcoats and District Tramways.
	Ardrossan, Saltcoats and District Tramways Order 1906	
Dunbartonshire Tramways Order Confirmation Act 1906	6 Edw. 7. c. ccxi	21 December 1906
An Act to confirm a Provisional Order under the Private Legislation Procedure (Scotland) Act 1899 relating to Dunbartonshire Tramways.
	Dunbartonshire Tramways Order 1906	
Dunfermline and District Tramways Order Confirmation Act 1906	6 Edw. 7. c. ccxii	21 December 1906
An Act to confirm a Provisional Order under the Private Legislation Procedure (Scotland) Act 1899 relating to Dunfermline and District Tramways.
	Dunfermline and District Tramways Order 1906	

=== Private and personal acts ===
Short title	Citation	Royal assent
Long title
Lord Tredegar's Supplemental Estate Act 1906	6 Edw. 7. c. 1 Pr.	4 August 1906
An Act for confirming an Agreement between the Right Honourable Godfrey Charles Viscount Tredegar, and the trustees of his settled estates, and the Alexandra (Newport and South Wales) Docks and Railway Company, for the conveyance to the Company of lands forming part of the settled estates; and an Agreement between the Company and Lord Tredegar for the issue to Lord Tredegar of a sum of £100,000 Preferred Ordinary Stock of the Company; for authorising the trustees of the settled estates to purchase from Lord Tredegar a sum of £25,000, part of such last-mentioned Preferred Ordinary Stock, and for other purposes.
Bute (English and Welsh) Estates Act 1906	6 Edw. 7. c. 2 Pr.	4 August 1906
An Act to make further provisions for the management of the English and Welsh Estates devised by the Trust Disposition and Settlement of John Patrick Crichton Stuart Marquess of Bute, deceased.
Wallis' Divorce Act 1906 (Note: This act was not printed by the King's Printer)	6 Edw. 7. c. 3 Pr.	29 May 1906
An Act to dissolve the Marriage of Elizabeth Caroline Wallis with Henry Aubrey Beaumont Wallis, commonly called Aubrey Wallis, her present husband, and to enable her to marry again, and for other purposes.

=== Sources ===
- Volume 44 - 6 Edward VII - 1906 – via Internet Archive.

== See also ==
- List of acts of the Parliament of the United Kingdom
