= Survey of production =

A survey of production is conducted by a government, of businesses within its jurisdiction, to obtain economic data needed for the compilation of national accounts, and other purposes. For practical reasons it is often not reasonable to obtain information from all possible business units, so that only a subset are contacted.

== Overview ==
Questionnaires are distributed to businesses, asking for information on various aspects of their operations. Sometimes completion of the questionnaires is voluntary; sometimes it is required by law. Typically, information is requested on the business's purchases, output, sales, capital expenditures and numbers of workers employed.

The level of detail asked for varies considerably. For example, regarding purchases, it may be that all that is asked for is a single figure representing total purchases, or it may be that a breakdown of purchases by type of commodity is requested.

== History ==
Census of Production Act 1906 (Note: Section 13.)
- Act of Parliament
- Parliament of the United Kingdom
- Long title: An Act to provide for taking a Census of Production.
- Citation: 6 Edw. 7. c. 49
- Territorial extent: United Kingdom

Dates
- Royal assent: 21 December 1906
- Commencement: 21 December 1906 (Note: The Acts of Parliament (Commencement) Act 1793.)
- Repealed: England and Wales and Scotland: 31 July 1947; Northern Ireland:
Other legislation
Amended by	Census of Production Act 1917; Factories Act 1937; Census of Production Act 1939
Repealed by	England and Wales and Scotland: Factories Act 1937 and Statistics of Trade Act 1947; Northern Ireland: Statistics of Trade Act (Northern Ireland) 1949

Status: Repealed

Text of statute as originally enacted

Census of Production Act 1917 (Note: Section 2.)
- Act of Parliament
- Parliament of the United Kingdom
- Long title: An Act to amend the Census of Production Act, 1906, with respect to the times at which a Census of Production may be taken.
- Citation: 7 & 8 Geo. 5. c. 2
- Territorial extent: United Kingdom

Dates
- Royal assent: 28 March 1917
- Commencement: 28 March 1917
- Repealed: England and Wales and Scotland: 31 July 1947; Northern Ireland:
Other legislation
Amends	Census of Production Act 1906
Repealed by	England and Wales and Scotland: Statistics of Trade Act 1947; Northern Ireland: Statistics of Trade Act (Northern Ireland) 1949

Status: Repealed

Text of statute as originally enacted

Census of Production Act 1939
- Act of Parliament
- Parliament of the United Kingdom
- Long title: An Act to amend the Census of Production Act, 1906.
- Citation: 2 & 3 Geo. 6. c. 15
- Territorial extent: United Kingdom

Dates
- Royal assent: 28 April 1939
- Commencement: 28 April 1939
- Repealed: England and Wales and Scotland: 31 July 1947; Northern Ireland:
Other legislation
Amends	Census of Production Act 1906
Repealed by	England and Wales and Scotland: Statistics of Trade Act 1947; Northern Ireland: Statistics of Trade Act (Northern Ireland) 1949

Status: Repealed

Text of statute as originally enacted

In the United Kingdom, the first "Census of Production" was carried out in respect of 1907, under the authority of the Census of Production Act 1906 (6 Edw. 7. c. 49); however, some of the topics it covered had been the subject of government surveys for a long time before then. The Board of Trade – equivalent of the modern British Department of Trade and Industry; was formed in 1786, and from a fairly early point in its existence began collecting trade statistics, albeit in a not very well-organised manner. However, in 1832 a separate department for statistics-gathering was formed within the board, and began publishing a yearbook. Although the yearbook's main focus was on import-export trade, it contained some information on domestic commercial activities. By the 1870s, considerable amounts of information were being gathered by various branches of government on employment and wages, and on agriculture. The first Census of Wages was conducted in 1886.

Although the 1906 Census of Productions Bill was introduced by David Lloyd George and had opposition support from Joseph Chamberlain, it was met with considerable suspicion by manufacturers, and several Members of Parliament expressed concerns about it, including that the manufacturers were "sacrificing their liberty to a gang of clerks in Downing street." Another concern was that manufacturers' trade secrets would be compromised.

The unit for the census was the "establishment", essentially a single business location, although minor ancillaries such as offices, warehouses, laboratories, and canteens, could be subsumed under it. A single company could have several "establishments". In 1958, the size of the unit was increased to the "business unit": a firm or company or group of companies, but in 1963 the unit reverted to the "establishment". In 1987, company-based reporting was again instituted. Also at that time, the scope of the survey was expanded to include all activity, not just production activity; and activity was classified to the industry of the company.

In 1998, the Census of Production was subsumed into the "Annual Business Inquiry", later the Annual Business Survey, which also replaced and integrated the Annual Census of Construction, the Purchases Inquiry, the Annual Employment Survey, and the six surveys covering the distribution and services sector: retail, wholesale, motor trades, catering, property, and (other) services.

== Bibliography ==
- Paul Smith and Stephen Penneck (2009) 100 Years of the Census of Production in the United Kingdom, GSS Methodological Series No 38, Office for National Statistics, United Kingdom. 61 pp. Discusses the history and methods of the Production Census.
