= Statistics of Trade Act 1947 =

Act of the Parliament of the United Kingdom

Statistics of Trade Act 1947 (Note: Section 19(1).)
- Act of Parliament
- Parliament of the United Kingdom
- Long title: An Act to enable certain government departments to obtain more readily the information necessary for the appreciation of economic trends and for the discharge of their functions; to consolidate and amend the law relating to the census of production; to provide for a census of distribution and other services; and for purposes connected with the matters aforesaid.
- Citation: 10 & 11 Geo. 6. c. 39
- Territorial extent: England and Wales; Scotland; (Note: Section 19(2).)

Dates
- Royal assent: 31 July 1947
- Commencement: 31 July 1947 (Note: The Acts of Parliament (Commencement) Act 1793.)

Other legislation
- Repeals/revokes: See § Repealed enactments
- Amended by: Statute Law Revision Act 1950; London County Council (General Powers) Act 1953; Building (Scotland) Act 1959; Public Health Act 1961; London Government Act 1963; Statistics of Trade Act 1947 (Amendment of Schedule) Order 1963; Industrial Expansion Act 1968; Ministry of Aviation Supply (Dissolution) Order 1971; Criminal Procedure (Scotland) Act 1975; Statute Law (Repeals) Act 1978; Transfer of Functions (Minister for the Civil Service and Treasury) Order 1981; Criminal Justice Act 1982; Statistics of Trade Act 1947 (Amendment of Schedule) Order 1987; Transfer of Functions (Economic Statistics) Order 1989; Enterprise and New Towns (Scotland) Act 1990; Statistics of Trade Act 1947 (Amendment of Schedule) Order 1990; Coal Industry Act 1994; Environment Act 1995; Gas Act 1995; [[[Scotland Act 1998 (Consequential Modifications) (No.2) Order 1999]]; Civil Partnership Act 2004; Railways Act 2005; Natural Resources Body for Wales (Functions) Order 2013; Bus Services Act 2025

Status: Partially repealed

Text of statute as originally enacted

Revised text of statute as amended

Text of the Statistics of Trade Act 1947 as in force today (including any amendments) within the United Kingdom, from legislation.gov.uk.

The Statistics of Trade Act 1947 (10 & 11 Geo. 6. c. 39) is an act of the Parliament of the United Kingdom that consolidated enactments relating to the census of production, and provided statutory authority for the collection of trade and economic statistics in Great Britain.

== Provisions ==
=== Repealed enactments ===
Section 19(4) of the act repealed 3 enactments, listed in that section.

Citation	Short title	Extent of repeal
6 Edw. 7. c. 49	Census of Production Act 1906	The whole act.
7 & 8 Geo. 5. c. 2	Census of Production Act 1917	The whole act.
2 & 3 Geo. 6. c. 15	Census of Production Act 1939	The whole act.

== Subsequent developments ==
The act has been amended on several occasions since its enactment. Subsections (1) and (2) of section 14 (which required building byelaws to include provisions for estimates of the cost of proposed works) were repealed by the Public Health Act 1961 (9 & 10 Eliz. 2. c. 64); subsection (3) was repealed by the London Government Act 1963; and subsection (4) was repealed by an earlier enactment. Section 18 (which applied the provisions of section 14 to Scotland by substituting references to Scottish building byelaw legislation) was repealed by the Building (Scotland) Act 1959. Section 16 (which authorised the exercise of the Board of Trade's powers by its officers) was repealed by the Industrial Expansion Act 1968.

Section 9A, requiring competent authorities to disclose information to the Environment Agency and equivalent bodies, was inserted by the Environment Act 1995. The Civil Partnership Act 2004 amended section 10(1) to extend references to marriage to civil partnerships. The Bus Services Act 2025 (c. 24) will insert new sections 9B and 9C into the act, subject to commencement.
