= Annual business survey (UK) =

Survey of production

The annual business survey, formerly the annual business inquiry, is a census of production in the United Kingdom, produced by the Office for National Statistics. It was introduced in 1988 and consolidated earlier surveys. Results were first published in 2000.
