= Dunfermline and District Tramways =

Tramway operator in Scotland

Operation
- Locale: Dunfermline
- Open: 2 November 1909
- Close: 4 July 1937
- Status: Closed

Infrastructure
- Track gauge: 3 ft 6 in (1,067 mm)
- Propulsion system: Electric
- Depot: St. Leonards Street

Statistics
- Route length: 18.36 miles (29.55 km)

The Dunfermline and District Tramways operated a tramway service in Dunfermline between 1909 and 1937.

== History ==
The Dunfermline and District Tramways Company was a subsidiary of the Fife Electric Power Company, itself a subsidiary of Balfour Beatty. The company started services on 2 November 1909 on a route that ran from Dunfermline via Cowdenbeath and Lochgelly to Lochore.

On 3 November 1909 a branch was opened from Dunfermline to Townhill. A branch opened from Cowdenbeath to Kelty on 17 November 1910. A third extension opened on 27 December 1913 from Dunfermline to Rumblingwell.

The final extension was a branch from Dunfermline along Queensferry Road to Rosyth. This opened on 17 May 1918.

== Closure ==
The tram network was closed on 4 July 1937. The depot at St. Leonards Street is now used by Stagecoach East Scotland.
