= Criminal Procedure (Scotland) Act 1975 =

Act of the Parliament of the United Kingdom

Criminal Procedure (Scotland) Act 1975 (Note: Section 464(1).)
- Act of Parliament
- Parliament of the United Kingdom
- Long title: An Act to consolidate certain enactments relating to criminal procedure in Scotland.
- Citation: 1975 c. 21
- Territorial extent: Scotland (Note: Section 463(3).)

Dates
- Royal assent: 8 May 1975
- Commencement: 16 May 1975 (various) (Note: Section 464(2).); Sections 23 and 329 deferred by Order in Council (Note: Section 464(3).); Sections 214 and 423 deferred by order (Note: Section 464(4).)
- Repealed: 1 April 1996
Other legislation
Amends	Protection of Animals Act 1934; See § Repealed enactments
Repeals/revokes	See § Repealed enactments
Amended by	Sexual Offences (Scotland) Act 1976; Interpretation Act 1978; Magistrates' Courts Act 1980; Law Reform (Miscellaneous Provisions) (Scotland) Act 1980; Representation of the People Act 1983; Mental Health (Scotland) Act 1984; Road Traffic Regulation Act 1984; Law Reform (Miscellaneous Provisions) (Scotland) Act 1985; Debtors (Scotland) Act 1987; Road Traffic (Consequential Provisions) Act 1988; Opticians Act 1989; Prisons (Scotland) Act 1989
Repealed by	Criminal Procedure (Consequential Provisions) (Scotland) Act 1995

Status: Repealed

Text of statute as originally enacted

Revised text of statute as amended

The Criminal Procedure (Scotland) Act 1975 (c. 21) was an act of the Parliament of the United Kingdom that consolidated enactments relating to criminal procedure in Scotland.

== Provisions ==
=== Repealed enactments ===
Section 461(2) of the act repealed 44 enactments and revoked 17 acts of Adjournal, listed in parts I and II of schedule 10 to the act, respectively.

Part I – Enactments repealed
Citation	Short title	Extent of repeal
1587 c. 54	Jurors Act 1587	Section 10.
1587 c. 57	Criminal Justice Act 1587	Sections 10 and 11.
1672 c. 40	Courts Act 1672	Section 3.
1672 c. 40	Courts Act 1672	Section 8.
1672 c. 40	Courts Act 1672	Section 10.
1693 c. 43	Criminal Procedure Act 1693	The whole act.
1701 c. 6	Criminal Procedure Act 1701	The words from "Our Sovereign" to "void and null".
54 Geo. 3. c. 67	Justiciary Courts (Scotland) Act 1814	Sections 1 to 4.
6 Geo. 4. c. 22	Jurors (Scotland) Act 1825	Sections 8 and 9.
6 Geo. 4. c. 22	Jurors (Scotland) Act 1825	In section 14, the proviso.
6 Geo. 4. c. 22	Jurors (Scotland) Act 1825	Sections 15 and 16.
6 Geo. 4. c. 22	Jurors (Scotland) Act 1825	Section 17, so far as relating to criminal trials.
6 Geo. 4. c. 22	Jurors (Scotland) Act 1825	Section 18.
6 Geo. 4. c. 22	Jurors (Scotland) Act 1825	Section 20.
7 Geo. 4. c. 8	Juries (Scotland) Act 1826	Sections 4 and 5 so far as relating to returns to criminal courts.
9 Geo. 4. c. 29	Circuit Courts (Scotland) Act 1828	Section 2.
9 Geo. 4. c. 29	Circuit Courts (Scotland) Act 1828	Section 5.
9 Geo. 4. c. 29	Circuit Courts (Scotland) Act 1828	Section 7.
9 Geo. 4. c. 29	Circuit Courts (Scotland) Act 1828	Section 10.
9 Geo. 4. c. 29	Circuit Courts (Scotland) Act 1828	Section 12.
9 Geo. 4. c. 29	Circuit Courts (Scotland) Act 1828	Section 14.
9 Geo. 4. c. 29	Circuit Courts (Scotland) Act 1828	Section 17.
9 Geo. 4. c. 29	Circuit Courts (Scotland) Act 1828	Section 21.
9 Geo. 4. c. 29	Circuit Courts (Scotland) Act 1828	Section 23.
11 Geo. 4 & 1 Will. 4. c. 37	Criminal Law (Scotland) Act 1830	Section 8.
11 Geo. 4 & 1 Will. 4. c. 37	Criminal Law (Scotland) Act 1830	Section 12.
1 & 2 Vict. c. 119	Sheriff Courts (Scotland) Act 1838	Section 25.
3 & 4 Vict. c. 59	Evidence (Scotland) Act 1840	Sections 1, 3 and 4 so far as relating to criminal proceedings.
11 & 12 Vict. c. 79	Justiciary (Scotland) Act 1848	Section 4.
11 & 12 Vict. c. 79	Justiciary (Scotland) Act 1848	Section 7.
11 & 12 Vict. c. 79	Justiciary (Scotland) Act 1848	Sections 11 and 12.
15 & 16 Vict. c. 27	Evidence (Scotland) Act 1852	Sections 1, 3 and 4 so far as relating to criminal proceedings.
16 & 17 Vict. c. 80	Sheriff Courts (Scotland) Act 1853	Section 34.
31 & 32 Vict. c. 95	Court of Justiciary (Scotland) Act 1868	Section 1.
31 & 32 Vict. c. 95	Court of Justiciary (Scotland) Act 1868	Section 10.
31 & 32 Vict. c. 95	Court of Justiciary (Scotland) Act 1868	Section 16.
31 & 32 Vict. c. 95	Court of Justiciary (Scotland) Act 1868	Section 18.
50 & 51 Vict. c. 35	Criminal Procedure (Scotland) Act 1887	Sections 1 and 2.
50 & 51 Vict. c. 35	Criminal Procedure (Scotland) Act 1887	In section 3, the words from "and all indictments" to the end of the section.
50 & 51 Vict. c. 35	Criminal Procedure (Scotland) Act 1887	Sections 4 to 44.
50 & 51 Vict. c. 35	Criminal Procedure (Scotland) Act 1887	Sections 47 to 76.
51 & 52 Vict. c. 36	Bail (Scotland) Act 1888	The whole act.
61 & 62 Vict. c. 36	Criminal Evidence Act 1898	The whole act, except so far as relating to courts-martial.
7 Edw. 7. c. 51	Sheriff Courts (Scotland) Act 1907	Section 4 so far as relating to criminal proceedings.
8 Edw. 7. c. 65	Summary Jurisdiction (Scotland) Act 1908	Section 2.
8 Edw. 7. c. 65	Summary Jurisdiction (Scotland) Act 1908	Section 10.
8 Edw. 7. c. 65	Summary Jurisdiction (Scotland) Act 1908	Section 19(3) and (5).
8 Edw. 7. c. 65	Summary Jurisdiction (Scotland) Act 1908	Section 30.
8 Edw. 7. c. 65	Summary Jurisdiction (Scotland) Act 1908	Section 43.
8 Edw. 7. c. 65	Summary Jurisdiction (Scotland) Act 1908	Sections 45 to 47.
8 Edw. 7. c. 65	Summary Jurisdiction (Scotland) Act 1908	Section 77.
6 & 7 Geo. 5. c. 50	Larceny Act 1916	Section 39(2) and (3).
9 & 10 Geo. 5. c. 71	Sex Disqualification (Removal) Act 1919	Sections 1 and 4(2) so far as relating to criminal proceedings.
11 & 12 Geo. 5. c. 50	Criminal Procedure (Scotland) Act 1921	The whole act.
15 & 16 Geo. 5. c. 81	Circuit Courts and Criminal Procedure (Scotland) Act 1925	The whole act.
16 & 17 Geo. 5. c. 15	Criminal Appeal (Scotland) Act 1926	Sections 1 to 3.
16 & 17 Geo. 5. c. 15	Criminal Appeal (Scotland) Act 1926	In section 4(1), the first and second sentences.
16 & 17 Geo. 5. c. 15	Criminal Appeal (Scotland) Act 1926	Sections 5 to 18.
23 & 24 Geo. 5. c. 41	Administration of Justice (Scotland) Act 1933	Section 19.
23 & 24 Geo. 5. c. 41	Administration of Justice (Scotland) Act 1933	Section 21.
1 Edw. 8 & 1 Geo. 6. c. 37	Children and Young Persons (Scotland) Act 1937	Sections 24 and 25.
1 Edw. 8 & 1 Geo. 6. c. 37	Children and Young Persons (Scotland) Act 1937	Sections 39 to 45.
1 Edw. 8 & 1 Geo. 6. c. 37	Children and Young Persons (Scotland) Act 1937	Section 46 so far as relating to criminal proceedings.
1 Edw. 8 & 1 Geo. 6. c. 37	Children and Young Persons (Scotland) Act 1937	Sections 47 to 55.
1 Edw. 8 & 1 Geo. 6. c. 37	Children and Young Persons (Scotland) Act 1937	Section 57(1) and (2).
1 Edw. 8 & 1 Geo. 6. c. 37	Children and Young Persons (Scotland) Act 1937	Section 58.
1 Edw. 8 & 1 Geo. 6. c. 37	Children and Young Persons (Scotland) Act 1937	Section 58A(1).
1 Edw. 8 & 1 Geo. 6. c. 37	Children and Young Persons (Scotland) Act 1937	Section 59(2), (3) and (4).
1 Edw. 8 & 1 Geo. 6. c. 37	Children and Young Persons (Scotland) Act 1937	Section 63.
1 Edw. 8 & 1 Geo. 6. c. 37	Children and Young Persons (Scotland) Act 1937	Section 67.
1 Edw. 8 & 1 Geo. 6. c. 37	Children and Young Persons (Scotland) Act 1937	Section 103.
1 Edw. 8 & 1 Geo. 6. c. 37	Children and Young Persons (Scotland) Act 1937	Schedule 1.
3 & 4 Geo. 6. c. 42	Law Reform (Miscellaneous Provisions) (Scotland) Act 1940	Section 8.
12, 13 & 14 Geo. 6. c. 94	Criminal Justice (Scotland) Act 1949	Part I, except sections 21 and 42.
12, 13 & 14 Geo. 6. c. 94	Criminal Justice (Scotland) Act 1949	Section 67.
12, 13 & 14 Geo. 6. c. 94	Criminal Justice (Scotland) Act 1949	Section 79(2).
12, 13 & 14 Geo. 6. c. 94	Criminal Justice (Scotland) Act 1949	Schedule 2.
12, 13 & 14 Geo. 6. c. 94	Criminal Justice (Scotland) Act 1949	In Schedule 11, the entries relating to the Criminal Procedure (Scotland) Act 1887 and the Children and Young Persons (Scotland) Act 1937 (other than section 62 thereof).
2 & 3 Eliz. 2. c. 48	Summary Jurisdiction (Scotland) Act 1954	Sections 1 to 73.
2 & 3 Eliz. 2. c. 48	Summary Jurisdiction (Scotland) Act 1954	In section 74, in subsection (1), the first sentence, and subsection (2).
2 & 3 Eliz. 2. c. 48	Summary Jurisdiction (Scotland) Act 1954	Section 75.
2 & 3 Eliz. 2. c. 48	Summary Jurisdiction (Scotland) Act 1954	Section 76(1)(a), (b) and (c).
2 & 3 Eliz. 2. c. 48	Summary Jurisdiction (Scotland) Act 1954	Section 77, except for the definition of "High Court".
2 & 3 Eliz. 2. c. 48	Summary Jurisdiction (Scotland) Act 1954	Section 78.
2 & 3 Eliz. 2. c. 48	Summary Jurisdiction (Scotland) Act 1954	Schedule 1.
2 & 3 Eliz. 2. c. 48	Summary Jurisdiction (Scotland) Act 1954	Schedule 4.
8 & 9 Eliz. 2. c. 23	First Offenders (Scotland) Act 1960	The whole act.
8 & 9 Eliz. 2. c. 61	Mental Health (Scotland) Act 1960	Sections 54 and 55.
8 & 9 Eliz. 2. c. 61	Mental Health (Scotland) Act 1960	Section 57(1) to (4).
8 & 9 Eliz. 2. c. 61	Mental Health (Scotland) Act 1960	Section 59(1).
8 & 9 Eliz. 2. c. 61	Mental Health (Scotland) Act 1960	Section 60(1), (2) and (4).
8 & 9 Eliz. 2. c. 61	Mental Health (Scotland) Act 1960	Sections 62 and 63.
8 & 9 Eliz. 2. c. 61	Mental Health (Scotland) Act 1960	Section 96(5).
8 & 9 Eliz. 2. c. 61	Mental Health (Scotland) Act 1960	In Schedule 4, the entry relating to the Criminal Justice (Scotland) Act 1949.
1963 c. 37	Children and Young Persons Act 1963	In section 57, subsection (2) and, in subsection (4), the words "and 54".
1963 c. 39	Criminal Justice (Scotland) Act 1963	Section 1.
1963 c. 39	Criminal Justice (Scotland) Act 1963	Section 2(2).
1963 c. 39	Criminal Justice (Scotland) Act 1963	Section 3.
1963 c. 39	Criminal Justice (Scotland) Act 1963	Sections 6 to 8.
1963 c. 39	Criminal Justice (Scotland) Act 1963	Section 13.
1963 c. 39	Criminal Justice (Scotland) Act 1963	Sections 16 and 17.
1963 c. 39	Criminal Justice (Scotland) Act 1963	Sections 23 to 25.
1963 c. 39	Criminal Justice (Scotland) Act 1963	Section 26(1).
1963 c. 39	Criminal Justice (Scotland) Act 1963	Sections 27 to 47.
1963 c. 39	Criminal Justice (Scotland) Act 1963	In section 53(1), the words "sections 39 and 40".
1963 c. 39	Criminal Justice (Scotland) Act 1963	In section 53(3), the words "section 38".
1963 c. 39	Criminal Justice (Scotland) Act 1963	In Schedule 1, paragraphs 4 to 10.
1963 c. 39	Criminal Justice (Scotland) Act 1963	In Schedule 3, Part I.
1963 c. 39	Criminal Justice (Scotland) Act 1963	In Schedule 5, the entries relating to the Summary Jurisdiction (Scotland) Act 1954 and the First Offenders (Scotland) Act 1960.
1965 c. 39	Criminal Procedure (Scotland) Act 1965	The whole act.
1965 c. 71	Murder (Abolition of Death Penalty) Act 1965	Section 1(1), (2), (3) and (5) except so far as relating to courts-martial.
1966 c. 19	Law Reform (Miscellaneous Provisions) (Scotland) Act 1966	Section 9.
1967 c. 80	Criminal Justice Act 1967	Section 48(1).
1967 c. 80	Criminal Justice Act 1967	Section 54(6) and (8).
1967 c. 80	Criminal Justice Act 1967	Section 62(8).
1967 c. 80	Criminal Justice Act 1967	Section 64(2)(c).
1967 c. 80	Criminal Justice Act 1967	Section 68.
1967 c. 80	Criminal Justice Act 1967	Section 72(1) to (4).
1967 c. 80	Criminal Justice Act 1967	Section 93(3).
1967 c. 80	Criminal Justice Act 1967	In Schedule 6, paragraph 21.
1968 c. 49	Social Work (Scotland) Act 1968	Section 56, except subsection (5).
1968 c. 49	Social Work (Scotland) Act 1968	Section 57(1).
1968 c. 49	Social Work (Scotland) Act 1968	In Schedule 2, in Part I, in paragraph 2, the words "(except in section 54)".
1968 c. 49	Social Work (Scotland) Act 1968	In Schedule 2, Part II, except in paragraph 16, section 58A (2) and (3) of the Children and Young Persons (Scotland) Act 1937, and paragraphs 7 and 18.
1968 c. 49	Social Work (Scotland) Act 1968	In Schedule 8, paragraphs 1, 22 to 31, 55, 56 and 69 to 72.
1969 c. 54	Children and Young Persons Act 1969	In Schedule 5, paragraphs 25, 26, 67 and 68.
1969 c. 54	Children and Young Persons Act 1969	In Schedule 5, in paragraph 65(2), the words "and 13".
1972 c. 71	Criminal Justice Act 1972	Section 23.
1973 c. 62	Powers of Criminal Courts Act 1973	In section 53, the words from "or under" to "1949".
1973 c. 62	Powers of Criminal Courts Act 1973	In section 58(a), the word "53".
1973 c. 62	Powers of Criminal Courts Act 1973	In Schedule 5, paragraphs 3, 8, 11, 18 and 19.
1973 c. 65	Local Government (Scotland) Act 1973	In Schedule 27, paragraphs 6, 7 and 15.

Part II – Acts of Adjournal revoked
Citation	Title	Extent of revocation
1815 (June 26)	Act of Adjournal—High Court (Scotland) Fines and Forfeited Penalties 1815	The words from "all fines imposed" (where those words first occur) to "otherwise disposed of".
1817 (Sep. 9)	Act of Adjournal—Swearing the same Assize on different trials 1817	The whole act.
1821 (July 9)	Act of Adjournal—Doubles of Indictments and Criminal Letters 1821	The whole act.
1849 (Aug. 1)	Act of Adjournal—Procedure and Records in the High Court 1849	Sections III and V.
1879 (Feb. 22)	Act of Adjournal—Sentences of Imprisonment 1879	The whole act.
1887 (Nov. 3)	Act of Adjournal—Summoning of Jurors and Report under Public Record (Scotland) Act 1809 1887	Section (3).
1900 (Mar. 20)	Act of Adjournal—Fine or Imprisonment (Scotland and Ireland) Act 1899 1900	The whole act.
1909 (Mar. 20)	Act of Adjournal—Appeals under section 63 of the Summary Jurisdiction (Scotland) Act 1908 1909	The whole act.
SR&O 1920/2462	Act of Adjournal—Return of Jurors for Sittings of High Court at Edinburgh 1920	The whole act.
SR&O 1921/167	Act of Adjournal—Sex Disqualification (Removal) Act 1919 and Jurors (Enrolment of Women) (Scotland) Act 1920 1921	The whole act.
SR&O 1925/366	Act of Adjournal—Absent Jurors, Application and Remissions of Fines 1925	The whole act.
SR&O 1926/1373	Act of Adjournal—Criminal Appeal (Scotland) Act 1926 1926	The whole act, except section 19(b) and the Schedule.
1935 (Mar. 22)	Act of Adjournal—Shorthand Notes at Criminal Trials 1935	The whole act.
SR&O 1936/1151	Act of Adjournal—Verdicts and Sentences 1936	The whole act.
1950 (June 15)	Act of Adjournal Fines on Indictments (Payment by Instalments) 1950	The whole act.
SI 1964/249	Act of Adjournal (Summary Procedure) 1964	The whole act, except sections 13 and 14 and the Schedule.
SI 1966/694	Act of Adjournal (Procedure in Criminal Trials Amendment) 1966	The whole act.

== Subsequent developments ==
The whole act was repealed by section 6(1) of, and schedule 5 to, the Criminal Procedure (Consequential Provisions) (Scotland) Act 1995, which came into force on 1 April 1996.
