= Law Reform (Miscellaneous Provisions) (Scotland) Act 1968 =

Act of the Parliament of the United Kingdom

Law Reform (Miscellaneous Provisions) (Scotland) Act 1968 (Note: Section 22(1).)
- Act of Parliament
- Parliament of the United Kingdom
- Long title: An Act to amend the law of Scotland relating to succession to the property of deceased persons in cases of illegitimacy; to confer on illegitimate persons in Scotland to legitim out of their deceased parents' estates; to amend the law of Scotland with respect to the construction of certain provisions of the Succession (Scotland) Act 1964 to tenancies of crofts; to amend the law of evidence in civil proceedings in Scotland; to re-enact, with amendments, the provisions of certain enactments relating to the duration of liferents in Scotland; to amend section 15(1) of the Succession (Scotland) Act 1964; further to amend the law of Scotland relating to prorogation of the jurisdiction of the sheriff court; to remove a restriction on the extent of land in Scotland which a trade union may purchase or take upon lease and otherwise deal with; and for purposes connected with the maters aforesaid.
- Citation: 1968 c. 70
- Territorial extent: Scotland (Note: Section 22(4).)

Dates
- Royal assent: 25 October 1968
- Commencement: 25 November 1968 (sections 1–9 and 16–22, and schedules 1–3) (Note: Section 22(5).); 1969 (sections 10–15) (Note: Section 22(5). The Law Reform (Miscellaneous Provisions) (Scotland) Act 1968 (Commencement No. 2) Order 1969 (SI 1969/1609).)
Other legislation
Amends	Trade Union Act 1871; Law Reform (Miscellaneous Provisions) (Scotland) Act 1940; Crofters (Scotland) Act 1955; Crofters (Scotland) Act 1961; Succession (Scotland) Act 1964; Law Reform (Miscellaneous Provisions) (Scotland) Act 1966; See § Repealed enactments
Amended by	Divorce (Scotland) Act 1976; Law Reform (Parent and Child) (Scotland) Act 1986; Civil Evidence (Scotland) Act 1988; Defamation Act 1996; Armed Forces Act 1996; Abolition of Feudal Tenure etc. (Scotland) Act 2000; Family Law (Scotland) Act 2006 (Consequential Modifications) Order 2006; Armed Forces Act 2006 (Consequential Amendments) Order 2009; Succession (Scotland) Act 2016; Sentencing Act 2020; Trusts and Succession (Scotland) Act 2024

Status: Amended

Text of statute as originally enacted

Revised text of statute as amended

Text of the Law Reform (Miscellaneous Provisions) (Scotland) Act 1968 as in force today (including any amendments) within the United Kingdom, from legislation.gov.uk.

The Law Reform (Miscellaneous Provisions) (Scotland) Act 1968 (c. 70) is an act of the Parliament of the United Kingdom that amended the law of Scotland relating to succession in cases of illegitimacy, evidence in civil proceedings, the duration of liferents, the jurisdiction of the sheriff court, and other matters.

== Provisions ==
=== Repealed enactments ===
Section 22(3) of the act repealed 4 enactments, listed in schedule 3 to the act.

Citation	Short title	Extent of repeal
34 & 35 Vict. c. 31	Trade Union Act 1871	In section 7, the words "not exceeding one acre".
1 & 2 Geo. 6. c. 50	Divorce (Scotland) Act 1938	In section 4(2), the words "adultery or".
3 & 4 Eliz. 2. c. 21	Crofters (Scotland) Act 1955	In section 11, subsections (2), (8) and (9).
1964 c. 41	Succession (Scotland) Act 1964	In section 37(1), paragraph (b).
1964 c. 41	Succession (Scotland) Act 1964	In Schedule 2, in paragraph 1, the words "(other than the tenancy of any croft within the meaning of section 3 of the Crofters (Scotland) Act 1955)".
