= Summary Jurisdiction (Scotland) Act 1954 =

Act of the Parliament of the United Kingdom

Summary Jurisdiction (Scotland) Act 1954 (Note: Section 79(1).)
- Act of Parliament
- Parliament of the United Kingdom
- Long title: An Act to consolidate certain enactments relating to summary jurisdiction and procedure in Scotland with corrections and improvements made under the Consolidation of Enactments (Procedure) Act, 1949.
- Citation: 2 & 3 Eliz. 2. c. 48
- Territorial extent: Scotland (Note: Section 79(3).)

Dates
- Royal assent: 30 July 1954
- Commencement: 1 January 1955 (Note: Section 79(2).)
- Repealed: 1 April 1996
Other legislation
Amends	See § Repealed enactments
Repeals/revokes	See § Repealed enactments
Amended by	Criminal Justice (Scotland) Act 1963; Law Reform (Miscellaneous Provisions) (Scotland) Act 1966; Criminal Justice Act 1967; Powers of Criminal Courts Act 1973; Criminal Procedure (Scotland) Act 1975; Divorce Jurisdiction, Court Fees and Legal Aid (Scotland) Act 1983; Statute Law (Repeals) Act 1989
Repealed by	Criminal Procedure (Consequential Provisions) (Scotland) Act 1995

Status: Repealed

Text of statute as originally enacted

Revised text of statute as amended

The Summary Jurisdiction (Scotland) Act 1954 (2 & 3 Eliz. 2. c. 48) was an act of the Parliament of the United Kingdom that consolidated enactments related to summary jurisdiction and procedure in Scotland.

== Provisions ==
=== Repealed enactments ===
Section 78(1) of the act repealed 7 enactments, listed in the fourth schedule to the act.

Citation	Short title	Extent of repeal
62 & 63 Vict. c. 11	Fine or Imprisonment (Scotland and Ireland) Act 1899	The whole act.
8 Edw. 7. c. 65	Summary Jurisdiction (Scotland) Act 1908	The whole Act except the following provisions namely:—section one, section two (so far as necessary for the interpretation of section seventy-seven), section seventy-seven and the enactments mentioned in paragraph (4) thereof as they apply to procedure under indictment.
9 Edw. 7. c. 28	Summary Jurisdiction (Scotland) Act 1908, Amendment Act 1909	The whole act.
4 & 5 Geo. 5. c. 58	Criminal Justice Administration Act 1914	The whole Act except the following provisions, namely:—section twenty-seven (so far as relating to offences to be tried on indictment), subsection (3) of section twenty-eight and subsection (1) of section forty-four.
1 & 2 Geo. 6. c. 48	Criminal Procedure (Scotland) Act 1938	Sections one to six; in section fourteen, subsection (2).
3 & 4 Geo. 6. c. 42	Law Reform (Miscellaneous Provisions) (Scotland) Act 1940	Sections nine and ten.
12, 13 & 14 Geo. 6. c. 94	Criminal Justice (Scotland) Act 1949	Section thirty-eight so far as relating to summary proceedings. In section forty-one, subsection (2). Section forty-three. Sections forty-five to forty-nine. The Seventh Schedule so far as relating to summary proceedings. The Eleventh Schedule so far as relating to the Summary Jurisdiction (Scotland) Act, 1908, or the Criminal Justice Administration Act, 1914.

== Subsequent developments ==
The whole act was repealed by section 6(1) of, and schedule 5 to, the Criminal Procedure (Consequential Provisions) (Scotland) Act 1995, which came into force on 1 April 1996.
