= Law Reform (Miscellaneous Provisions) (Scotland) Act 1940 =

Act of the Parliament of the United Kingdom

Law Reform (Miscellaneous Provisions) (Scotland) Act 1940 (Note: Section 11(1).)
- Act of Parliament
- Parliament of the United Kingdom
- Long title: An Act to amend the law of Scotland relating to enforcement of decrees ad factum praestandum, to solatium and damages, to contribution among joint wrongdoers, and to prorogation of the jurisdiction of the Sheriff Court; to amend and extend the Intestate Husband's Estate (Scotland) Acts, 1911 and 1919; to make provision regarding the powers of the King's and Lord Treasurer's Remembrancer; to enable effect to be given to International Conventions affecting Scottish Courts; and to amend the law of Scotland relating to criminal procedure.
- Citation: 3 & 4 Geo. 6. c. 42
- Territorial extent: Scotland (Note: Section 11(2).)

Dates
- Royal assent: 17 July 1940
- Commencement: 17 July 1940 (Note: The Acts of Parliament (Commencement) Act 1793.)

Other legislation
- Amends: Summary Jurisdiction (Scotland) Act 1908; See § Repealed enactments
- Amended by: Crown Proceedings Act 1947; Statute Law Revision Act 1950; Summary Jurisdiction (Scotland) Act 1954; Succession (Scotland) Act 1964; Hire-Purchase (Scotland) Act 1965; Law Reform (Miscellaneous Provisions) (Scotland) Act 1968; Administration of Estates Act 1971; Sheriff Courts (Scotland) Act 1971; Consumer Credit Act 1974; Transfer of Functions (Treasury and Secretary of State) Order 1974; Criminal Procedure (Scotland) Act 1975; Damages (Scotland) Act 1976; State Immunity Act 1978; Civil Jurisdiction and Judgments Act 1982; Defamation Act 1996; Human Rights Act 1998

Status: Amended

Text of statute as originally enacted

Revised text of statute as amended

Text of the Law Reform (Miscellaneous Provisions) (Scotland) Act 1940 as in force today (including any amendments) within the United Kingdom, from legislation.gov.uk.

The Law Reform (Miscellaneous Provisions) (Scotland) Act 1940 (3 & 4 Geo. 6. c. 42) is an act of the Parliament of the United Kingdom that amended the law of Scotland relating to enforcement of decrees ad factum praestandum, solatium and damages, contribution among joint wrongdoers, prorogation of the jurisdiction of the sheriff court, intestate succession, the powers of the King's and Lord Treasurer's Remembrancer, international conventions affecting Scottish courts, and criminal procedure.

== Provisions ==
=== Repealed enactments ===
Section 11(3) of the act repealed 4 enactments, listed in the schedule to the act.

Citation	Short title	Extent of repeal
1 & 2 Vict. c. 114	Debtors (Scotland) Act 1838	Sections six, seven, nine, and eleven so far as relating to decrees ad factum praestandum.
55 & 56 Vict. c. 17	Sheriff Courts (Scotland) Extracts Act 1892	Section seven so far as relating to decrees ad factum praestandum.
8 Edw. 7. c. 65	Summary Jurisdiction (Scotland) Act 1908	In section thirty-three, paragraph (2) from the words "and may also" to the end of the paragraph.
22 & 23 Geo. 5. c. 38	Hire Purchase and Small Debt (Scotland) Act 1932	In section four, paragraph (a).

== Subsequent developments ==
Sections 9 and 10 of the act were repealed by section 78(1) of, and schedule 4 to, the Summary Jurisdiction (Scotland) Act 1954. Section 5 was repealed with saving by sections 1(1) and 34(2) of, and schedule 3 to, the Succession (Scotland) Act 1964. Section 8 was repealed by section 461(2) of, and schedule 10 part I to, the Criminal Procedure (Scotland) Act 1975. Section 2 was repealed by section 11 of, and schedule 2 to, the Damages (Scotland) Act 1976. Section 7 was repealed by section 23(2) of the State Immunity Act 1978.

Sections 1, 3, 4, 6 and 11 remain in force. Section 3(2) was extended by section 3(9) of the Defamation Act 1996 and was prospectively modified by section 8(5)(a) of the Human Rights Act 1998.
