= Law Reform (Miscellaneous Provisions) (Scotland) Act 1966 =

Act of the Parliament of the United Kingdom

Law Reform (Miscellaneous Provisions) (Scotland) Act 1966 (Note: Section 11(3).)
- Act of Parliament
- Parliament of the United Kingdom
- Long title: An Act to exempt from arrestment on the dependence of an action sums falling to be paid by way of wages, salary or other earnings or by way of pension, to abolish the exemption from arrestment in execution of certain earnings payable by the Crown, and to provide for the variation from time to time of the amount of wages excepted from arrestment under the Wages Arrestment Limitation (Scotland) Act 1870; to amend section 5 of the Adoption Act 1958, and to provide in Scotland for the succession of an adopted person to the estate of his natural parent in certain circumstances; to amend section 5 of the Trusts (Scotland) Act 1961; to provide for the admission in evidence of certain documents in civil proceedings; to confer jurisdiction on the sheriff court to vary or recall certain orders of the Court of Session in respect of maintenance, custody and welfare of children; to provide for the extension of certain time limits in appeals under the Summary Jurisdiction (Scotland) Act 1954; and to provide that acts of adjournal and acts of sederunt shall be statutory instruments.
- Citation: 1966 c. 19
- Territorial extent: Scotland (Note: Section 11(3).)

Dates
- Royal assent: 3 August 1966
- Commencement: 3 August 1966 (Note: The Acts of Parliament (Commencement) Act 1793.)

Other legislation
- Amends: See § Repealed enactments
- Repeals/revokes: See § Repealed enactments
- Amended by: Law Reform (Miscellaneous Provisions) (Scotland) Act 1968; Guardianship Act 1973; Statute Law (Repeals) Act 1974; Criminal Procedure (Scotland) Act 1975; Children Act 1975; Divorce (Scotland) Act 1976; Matrimonial and Family Proceedings Act 1984; Family Law (Scotland) Act 1985; Family Law Act 1986; Debtors (Scotland) Act 1987; Civil Evidence (Scotland) Act 1988; Children (Scotland) Act 1995; Interpretation and Legislative Reform (Scotland) Act 2010; Courts Reform (Scotland) Act 2014 (Consequential Provisions) Order 2015; Trusts and Succession (Scotland) Act 2024

Status: Amended

Text of statute as originally enacted

Revised text of statute as amended

Text of the Law Reform (Miscellaneous Provisions) (Scotland) Act 1966 as in force today (including any amendments) within the United Kingdom, from legislation.gov.uk.

The Law Reform (Miscellaneous Provisions) (Scotland) Act 1966 (c. 19) is an act of the Parliament of the United Kingdom that amended the law of Scotland in several respects, including exempting wages, salaries and pensions from arrestment on the dependence of an action, amending the law of adoption, succession and trusts in Scotland, and providing that acts of adjournal and acts of sederunt shall be statutory instruments.

== Provisions ==
=== Repealed enactments ===
Section 11(2) of the act repealed 18 enactments, listed in parts I and II of the schedule to the act.

Part I: Repeals consequential on section 10
Citation	Short title	Extent of repeal
11 & 12 Geo. 6. c. 38	Companies Act 1948	In section 365, in subsection (5), paragraph (b).
12, 13 & 14 Geo. 6. c. 63	Legal Aid and Solicitors (Scotland) Act 1949	Section 13(6).
12, 13 & 14 Geo. 6. c. 68	Representation of the People Act 1949	In section 173, in subsection (5), the words from "and be" to the end of the subsection.
12, 13 & 14 Geo. 6. c. 90	Election Commissioners Act 1949	Section 15(4).
14 Geo. 6. c. 27	Arbitration Act 1950	In section 38 as read with section 41(4) in subsection (3), the words "exercisable by statutory instrument" and the words from "and the" to the end of the subsection.
14 Geo. 6. c. 34	Housing (Scotland) Act 1950	Section 166(5).
14 Geo. 6. c. 37	Maintenance Orders Act 1950	Section 29.
14 & 15 Geo. 6. c. 65	Reserve and Auxiliary Forces (Protection of Civil Interests) Act 1951	Section 11(3).
15 & 16 Geo. 6 & 1 Eliz. 2. c. 47	Rating and Valuation (Scotland) Act 1952	Section 6(2).
2 & 3 Eliz. 2. c. 48	Summary Jurisdiction (Scotland) Act 1954	Section 76(4).
7 & 8 Eliz. 2. c. 5	Adoption Act 1958	In section 56(1), the words "or the Court of Session", and subsection (2).
7 & 8 Eliz. 2. c. 24	Building (Scotland) Act 1959	Section 16(6).
7 & 8 Eliz. 2. c. 51	Licensing (Scotland) Act 1959	Section 29(3).
8 & 9 Eliz. 2. c. 62	Caravan Sites and Control of Development Act 1960	Section 32(4).
10 & 11 Eliz. 2. c. 21	Commonwealth Immigrants Act 1962	In section 8, in subsection (6), from "; and any" to the end of the subsection.
1963 c. 2	Betting, Gaming and Lotteries Act 1963	In section 55, in subsection (4), the words from the beginning to "instrument, and" and the words "of such a power or".
1964 c. 41	Succession (Scotland) Act 1964	Section 22(3).

Part II: Other Repeals
Citation	Short title	Extent of repeal
8 & 9 Vict. c. 39	Wages Arrestment (Scotland) Act 1845	The whole act.

== Subsequent developments ==
Section 11(2) of, and the schedule to, the act were repealed by section 1 of, and part XI of the schedule to, the Statute Law (Repeals) Act 1974, which came into force on 27 June 1974.
