= Rating and Valuation (Scotland) Act 1952 =

Act of the Parliament of the United Kingdom

Rating and Valuation (Scotland) Act 1952 (Note: Section 8(4).)
- Act of Parliament
- Parliament of the United Kingdom
- Long title: An Act to amend the law relating to the rating and valuation of lands and heritages in Scotland leased or occupied by certain public bodies and of lands and heritages used or occupied as sub-post offices in Scotland; and to make provision for notice to rating authorities of proposed entries in the valuation roll made up by the Assessor of Public Undertakings (Scotland), for correction and amendment of the said roll and for prescribing dates for the purposes thereof, and for regulating the procedure in valuation appeals in Scotland.
- Citation: 15 & 16 Geo. 6 & 1 Eliz. 2. c. 47
- Territorial extent: United Kingdom

Dates
- Royal assent: 1 August 1952
- Commencement: 1 August 1952 (Note: The Acts of Parliament (Commencement) Act 1793.)

Other legislation
- Amends: Lands Valuation (Scotland) Act 1857; Valuation of Lands (Scotland) Amendment Act 1879; Railways (Valuation for Rating) Act 1930; Local Government Act 1948; Gas Act 1948
- Amended by: Valuation and Rating (Scotland) Act 1956; Statute Law Revision Act 1963; Local Government (Financial Provisions) (Scotland) Act 1963; Law Reform (Miscellaneous Provisions) (Scotland) Act 1966; Post Office Act 1969; Local Government (Scotland) Act 1973; Statute Law (Repeals) Act 1974; Local Government (Scotland) Act 1975; Rating and Valuation (Amendment) (Scotland) Act 1984; Local Government and Rating Act 1997

Status: Amended

Text of statute as originally enacted

Revised text of statute as amended

Text of the Rating and Valuation (Scotland) Act 1952 as in force today (including any amendments) within the United Kingdom, from legislation.gov.uk.

The Rating and Valuation (Scotland) Act 1952 (15 & 16 Geo. 6 & 1 Eliz. 2. c. 47) is an act of the Parliament of the United Kingdom. The act amended the law relating to rating and valuation of Scottish land which was leased to certain public bodies.

== Subsequent developments ==
Section 8(3) of, and schedule 2 to, the act were repealed by section 1 of, and part XI of the schedule to, the Statute Law (Repeals) Act 1974, which came into force on 27 June 1974.
