= List of acts of the Parliament of Scotland from 1693 =

This is a list of acts of the Parliament of Scotland for the year 1693.

It lists acts of Parliament of the old Parliament of Scotland, that was merged with the old Parliament of England to form the Parliament of Great Britain, by the Union with England Act 1707 (c. 7).

For other years, see list of acts of the Parliament of Scotland. For the period after 1707, see list of acts of the Parliament of Great Britain.

== 1693 ==
The 4th session of the parliament of William and Mary, held in Edinburgh from 18 April 1693.

Short title, or popular name	Citation	Royal assent
Long title
Members of Parliament Act 1693 (repealed)	1693 c. 1 (Note: This is the citation in the Record Edition.) — (Note: This act is not listed in the Duodecimal Edition.)	25 April 1693
Act concerning the Members who have not signed the Assurance. Act concerning the Members who have not signed the Assurance. (Repealed by Statute Law Revision (Scotland) Act 1906 (6 Edw. 7. c. 38))
Members of Parliament (No. 2) Act 1693 (repealed)	1693 c. 2 —	25 April 1693
Act against the Members who have not taken the oath of Allegiance. Act against the Members who have not taken the oath of Allegiance. (Repealed by Statute Law Revision (Scotland) Act 1906 (6 Edw. 7. c. 38))
Absent Members Act 1693 (repealed)	1693 c. 3 —	28 April 1693
Act fyning the absent Barons and Burrowes. Act fining the absent Barons and Burghers. (Repealed by Statute Law Revision (Scotland) Act 1906 (6 Edw. 7. c. 38))
Absent Noblemen Act 1693 (repealed)	1693 c. 4 —	28 April 1693
Act fyning the absent Noblemen. Act fining the absent Noblemen. (Repealed by Statute Law Revision (Scotland) Act 1906 (6 Edw. 7. c. 38))
Not public and general	1693 c. 5 —	28 April 1693
Act of Indemnitie in favours of William Faa Thomas Neilson and James Wilson.
Monthly Fast Act 1693 (repealed)	1693 c. 6; 1693 c. 1 (Note: This is the citation in the Duodecimal Edition.)	2 May 1693
Act for a Monethly Fast. Act for a Monthly Fast. (Repealed by Statute Law Revision (Scotland) Act 1906 (6 Edw. 7. c. 38))
Not public and general	1693 c. 7 —	2 May 1693
Act in favours of Henry Lord Cardross and Sir Colin Campbell of Aberurchill anent their Losses.
Supply Act 1693 (repealed)	1693 c. 8; 1693 c. 2	4 May 1693
Act for a new Supply out of the Land Rent. Act for a new Supply out of the Land Rent. (Repealed by Statute Law Revision (Scotland) Act 1906 (6 Edw. 7. c. 38))
Seamen Act 1693 (repealed)	1693 c. 9 —	4 May 1693
Act for Levying of Seamen. Act for the Levying of Seamen. (Repealed by Statute Law Revision (Scotland) Act 1906 (6 Edw. 7. c. 38))
Excise Act 1693 (repealed)	1693 c. 10; 1693 c. 3	5 May 1693
Act for ane additional Excise. Act for an additional Excise. (Repealed by Statute Law Revision (Scotland) Act 1906 (6 Edw. 7. c. 38))
Defence of the Realm Act 1693 (repealed)	1693 c. 11; 1693 c. 4	11 May 1693
Act against false Musters and free Quarters and anent due paying of their Majesties Forces. Act against false Musters and free Quarters, and regarding the due payment of their Majesties' Forces. (Repealed by Statute Law Revision (Scotland) Act 1906 (6 Edw. 7. c. 38))
Herring and Salmon Act 1693 (repealed)	1693 c. 12; 1693 c. 5	12 May 1693
Act anent the loyall Cureing and Packing of Herring and Salmond Fish. (Repealed by Statute Law Revision (Scotland) Act 1906 (6 Edw. 7. c. 38))
Not public and general	1693 c. 13 —	12 May 1693
Act in favors of the Countes of Weyms.
Oath of Allegiance Act 1693 (repealed)	1693 c. 14; 1693 c. 6	19 May 1693
Act for takeing the Oath of Allegiance and Assurance. Act for taking the Oath of Allegiance and Assurance. (Repealed by Promissory Oaths Act 1871 (34 & 35 Vict. c. 48))
Defence of the Realm Act 1693 (repealed)	1693 c. 15; 1693 c. 7	23 May 1693
Act for the Levy. Act for the Levy. (Repealed by Statute Law Revision (Scotland) Act 1906 (6 Edw. 7. c. 38))
France Act 1693 (repealed)	1693 c. 16; 1693 c. 8	23 May 1693
Act against Corresponding with France. Act against Corresponding with France. (Repealed by Statute Law Revision (Scotland) Act 1906 (6 Edw. 7. c. 38))
Poll Money Act 1693 (repealed)	1693 c. 17; 1693 c. 9	29 May 1693
Act for Pole Money. (Repealed by Statute Law Revision (Scotland) Act 1906 (6 Edw. 7. c. 38))
Bishop's Rents Act 1693 (repealed)	1693 c. 18; 1693 c. 10	29 May 1693
Act ordering Quartering for the Bishops Rents in the Bounds of the Synod of Argyle and the Isles. (Repealed by Statute Law Revision (Scotland) Act 1906 (6 Edw. 7. c. 38))
Not public and general	1693 c. 19 —	29 May 1693
Act in favors of Agnes Campbell relict of Andrew Anderson His Majesties Printer.
Adjournment of Session Act 1693 (repealed)	1693 c. 20; 1693 c. 11	30 May 1693
Act Adjourning the Session to the First of November. Act Adjourning the Session to the First of November. (Repealed by Statute Law Revision (Scotland) Act 1906 (6 Edw. 7. c. 38))
Citation Act 1693 still in force	1693 c. 21; 1693 c. 12	30 May 1693
Act concerning Citations to the first and second Dyets.
Real Rights Act 1693 still in force	1693 c. 22; 1693 c. 13	30 May 1693
Act concerning the preference of Real Rights.
Register of Sasines Act 1693 still in force	1693 c. 23; 1693 c. 14	30 May 1693
Act concerning the Registers of Sasines Reversions &c. Act concerning the Registers of Sasines, Reversions, etc.
Registration Act 1693 still in force	1693 c. 24; 1693 c. 15	30 May 1693
Act for Summar Registrations and Discharging Transferrings active.
Not public and general	1693 c. 25 —	5 June 1693
Decreet in favors of Walter Cheisley of Dalry against M_{r} Charles Fane of London Gentleman.
Not public and general	1693 c. 26 —	5 June 1693
Act in favours of Captain William Burnet of Balfour.
Not public and general	1693 c. 27 —	5 June 1693
Decreet in favours of Sir William Sharp of Scotscraig against Alexander Earl of Murray and Patrick Earl of Strathmore.
Saltcoats Harbour Act 1693 Not public and general	1693 c. 28 —	7 June 1693
Act Explanatory in favors of Robert Cuninghame of Auchinharvy for perfecting ane Harbour at Saltcoats.
Excise (No. 2) Act 1693 (repealed)	1693 c. 29; 1693 c. 16	7 June 1693
Act Explanatory anent the Additional Excise. Explanatory Act regarding the Additional Excise. (Repealed by Statute Law Revision (Scotland) Act 1906 (6 Edw. 7. c. 38))
Court of Session (No. 1) Act 1693 (repealed)	1693 c. 31; 1693 c. 17	7 June 1693
Act anent advising Concluded Causes. (Repealed by Statute Law Revision (Scotland) Act 1906 (6 Edw. 7. c. 38))
Interlocutors Act 1693	1693 c. 31; 1693 c. 18	7 June 1693
Act anent the Signing of Interlocutors immediately after Voting.
Court of Session (No. 2) Act 1693 (repealed)	1693 c. 32; 1693 c. 19	7 June 1693
Act anent the Lords of Session sitting in the Outer house by turns. Act regarding the Lords of Session sitting in the Outer House by turns. (Repealed by Statute Law Revision (Scotland) Act 1906 (6 Edw. 7. c. 38))
Court of Session (No. 3) Act 1693 (repealed)	1693 c. 33; 1693 c. 19	7 June 1693
Act anent Advocats their Subscribing of the Minutes of Debate. (Repealed by Statute Law Revision (Scotland) Act 1906 (6 Edw. 7. c. 38))
Court of Session (No. 4) Act 1693 (repealed)	1693 c. 34; 1693 c. 19	7 June 1693
Act anent the Lord Ordinar his not Leaving the Outer bench. (Repealed by Statute Law Revision (Scotland) Act 1906 (6 Edw. 7. c. 38))
Not public and general	1693 c. 35 —	8 June 1693
Decreet in favours of Gideon Scott of Heychester against Sir John Dempster of Pitliver.
Not public and general	1693 c. 36 —	9 June 1693
Act in favours of Alexander Irvine of Drum and his Administrators.
Fast Act 1693 (repealed)	1693 c. 37 —	12 June 1693
Act prorogating the Monethly Fast within the Town and Suburbs of Edinburgh. Act prorogating the Monthly Fast within the Town and Suburbs of Edinburgh. (Repealed by Statute Law Revision (Scotland) Act 1906 (6 Edw. 7. c. 38))
Ministers Act 1693 still in force	1693 c. 38; 1693 c. 22	12 June 1693
Act for Setling the Quiet and Peace of the Church.
Teind Commission Act 1693 (repealed)	1693 c. 39; 1693 c. 24	12 June 1693
Act Renewing the Commission for Plantation of Kirks and Valuation of Teinds. (Repealed by Statute Law Revision (Scotland) Act 1964 (c. 80))
Removings Act 1693 still in force	1693 c. 40; 1693 c. 24	12 June 1693
Act anent the Term of Whitsunday.
Parsonages Act 1693 (repealed)	1693 c. 41; 1693 c. 25	12 June 1693
Act anent Parsonages. Act regarding Parsonages. (Repealed by Statute Law Revision (Scotland) Act 1906 (6 Edw. 7. c. 38))
Court of Session Act 1693 still in force	1693 c. 42; 1693 c. 26	12 June 1693
Act anent the Lords of Session their Advising with open doors.
Criminal Procedure Act 1693 (repealed)	1693 c. 43; 1693 c. 27	12 June 1693
Act anent Advising Criminal Processes with open doors. (Repealed by Criminal Procedure (Scotland) Act 1975 (c. 21))
Not public and general	1693 c. 44 —	12 June 1693
Act and Ratification in favours of George Earle of Melvill.
Common Good Act 1693 (repealed)	1693 c. 45; 1693 c. 28	14 June 1693
Act anent the Common Good of Royall Burrowes. Act regarding the Common Good of Royal Burghs. (Repealed by Statute Law Revision (Scotland) Act 1964 (c. 80))
Forfeited Persons Act 1693 (repealed)	1693 c. 46; 1693 c. 31	14 June 1693
Act anent Forfaulted Persons. Act regarding Forfeited Persons. (Repealed by Statute Law Revision (Scotland) Act 1906 (6 Edw. 7. c. 38))
Edinburgh Beer Duties Act 1693Not public and general	1693 c. 47 —	14 June 1693
Act in favours of the Town of Edinburgh for an Imposition on Ale and Beer.
Linen Act 1693 (repealed)	1693 c. 48; 1693 c. 29	14 June 1693
Act in favours of the Manufactury of Baises & Erecting them in a free Incorporation. (Repealed by Statute Law Revision (Scotland) Act 1906 (6 Edw. 7. c. 38))
Baize Act 1693 (repealed)	1693 c. 49 —	14 June 1693
Act anent the right making and measuring of Linen Cloath. (Repealed by Statute Law Revision (Scotland) Act 1906 (6 Edw. 7. c. 38))
Foreign Trade Act 1693 (repealed)	1693 c. 50; 1693 c. 32	14 June 1693
Act for Encouraging of Forraigne Trade. Act for Encouraging of Foreign Trade. (Repealed by Statute Law Revision (Scotland) Act 1906 (6 Edw. 7. c. 38))
Burghs Act 1693 (repealed)	1693 c. 51; 1693 c. 30	14 June 1693
Act and Ratification anent the Communication of Trade to Burghs of Barony and Regality. (Repealed by Statute Law Revision (Scotland) Act 1964 (c. 80))
Not public and general	1693 c. 52 —	14 June 1693
Act in favors of the Linen Manufactory at the Citadel of Leith and Erecting them in a free Incorporation.
Not public and general	1693 c. 53 —	14 June 1693
Act Erecting the Woollen Manufactory at Newmilnes in a free Incorporation.
Not public and general	1693 c. 54 —	14 June 1693
Decreet in favours of the Children of Sir Thomas Stewart of Kirkfield for proving the Tenor of their burnt Writs.
Not public and general	1693 c. 55 —	14 June 1693
Act in favors of William Scot Cabinet Maker for making of Coaches.
Not public and general	1693 c. 56 —	14 June 1693
Act in favours of Jean Home relict of James Renton of Billie.
Not public and general	1693 c. 57 —	14 June 1693
Act in favours of Alexander Monro of Bearcrofts.
Not public and general	1693 c. 58 —	14 June 1693
Act in favours of Doctor Chamberland.
Not public and general	1693 c. 59 —	14 June 1693
Act in favours of Marmaduck Hudson.
Oath of Allegiance (No. 2) Act 1693 (repealed)	1693 c. 60; 1693 c. 37	15 June 1693
Act Prorogating the Dyet for Ministers to take the Oath of Alledgeance and Assurance. (Repealed by Statute Law Revision (Scotland) Act 1906 (6 Edw. 7. c. 38))
Court of Session (No. 5) Act 1693 (repealed)	1693 c. 61; 1693 c. 38	15 June 1693
Additional Act ordaining the Lords of Session to judge summarly anent the persons restored against their Forfaultures. (Repealed by Statute Law Revision (Scotland) Act 1906 (6 Edw. 7. c. 38))
Justiciary Act 1693 (repealed)	1693 c. 62; 1693 c. 39	15 June 1693
Act for the Justiciary in the Highlands. Act for the Justiciary in the Highlands. (Repealed by Statute Law Revision (Scotland) Act 1906 (6 Edw. 7. c. 38))
Not public and general	1693 c. 63 —	15 June 1693
Act and Recommendation in favors of James Earle of Mortoun.
Profaneness Act 1693 (repealed)	1693 c. 64; 1693 c. 40	15 June 1693
Act against Profaneness. Act against Profaneness. (Repealed by Statute Law Revision (Scotland) Act 1906 (6 Edw. 7. c. 38))
Not public and general	1693 c. 65 —	15 June 1693
Act and Remitt in favors Dame Margaret Erskine Lady Castlehaven.
Glasgow Beer Duties Act 1693Not public and general	1693 c. 66 —	15 June 1693
Act in favours of the Town of Glasgow for an Imposition on Ale and Beer.
Universities Act 1693 (repealed)	1693 c. 67; 1693 c. 41	15 June 1693
Act altering the Quorum of the Commission for Visitation of Universities Colledges and Schools. (Repealed by Statute Law Revision (Scotland) Act 1906 (6 Edw. 7. c. 38))
Not public and general	1693 c. 68 —	15 June 1693
Act in favours of the Burgh of Irvine. Act in favour of the Burgh of Irvine.
Not public and general	1693 c. 69 —	15 June 1693
Act in favours of the Earle of Melvill and Lord Polwarth.
Not public and general	1693 c. 70 —	15 June 1693
Act in favours of Sir Archibald Cockburn of Langtoun.
Treason Act 1693 (repealed)	1693 c. 71; 1693 c. 33	15 June 1693
Act anent Resetting and with declared Traitors. (Repealed by Statute Law Revision (Scotland) Act 1906 (6 Edw. 7. c. 38))
Judicatories Act 1693 (repealed)	1693 c. 72; 1693 c. 34	15 June 1693
Commission for Regulation of Judicatories. (Repealed by Statute Law Revision (Scotland) Act 1906 (6 Edw. 7. c. 38))
Resignations and Sasines Act 1693 (repealed)	1693 c. 73; 1693 c. 35	15 June 1693
Act anent Procuratories of Resignation and Precepts of Sasine. (Repealed by Statute Law Revision (Scotland) Act 1906 (6 Edw. 7. c. 38))
Not public and general	1693 c. 74; 1693 c. 36	15 June 1693
Act explaneing ane Exception in the Act anent Patronages for the Provestrie of Hamilton.
Not public and general	1693 c. 75 —	15 June 1693
Ratification in favors of John Earl of Tweddale Lord High Chancellor of the Lordship and Regality of Dumfermling.
Not public and general	1693 c. 76 —	15 June 1693
Ratification in favor of Margaret Countess of Rothes and John Lord Lesly her son of the Lands of Beg and Coldaine.
Not public and general	1693 c. 77 —	15 June 1693
Ratification in favors of the Merchant Company of Edinburgh.
Not public and general	1693 c. 78 —	15 June 1693
Ratification in favors of the Burgh of the Canongate.
Not public and general	1693 c. 79 —	15 June 1693
Ratification in favours of the Incorporation of the freemen Fleshers of Edinburgh.
Not public and general	1693 c. 80 —	15 June 1693
Ratification in favours of John Ross of Nuick.
Not public and general	1693 c. 81 —	15 June 1693
Ratification in favours of George Moncreiffe of Readie of the Barony of Myres office of Macerie before the Lords of Session &c.
Not public and general	1693 c. 82 —	15 June 1693
Ratification in favours of Mr Archibald Hope of Rankeillor of the Lands of Easter Fairnie.
Not public and general	1693 c. 83 —	15 June 1693
Ratification in favours of James Hamiltone of Litle Ernock of Manufactories for making playing Cards and for friezing of Cloth.
Not public and general	1693 c. 84 —	15 June 1693
Ratification in favours of Anna Dutches of Buccleuch of the Earldom and Lordship of Buccleuch.
Not public and general	1693 c. 85 —	15 June 1693
Ratification in favours of Thomas Hay of Balhousie of the Lands Barony and Regality of Balhousie.
Not public and general	1693 c. 86 —	15 June 1693
Ratification in favors of Sir John Scot of Ancrum of the Lands of Nether Chatto &c.
Not public and general	1693 c. 87 —	15 June 1693
Ratification in favours of Mr John Kerson to the Earl of Lothian of his office of being conjunct Director of the Chancellary not recorded.
Not public and general	1693 c. 88 —	15 June 1693
Ratification in favors of the Toun of Edinburgh. Ratification in favour of the Town of Edinburgh.
Saving the Rights Act 1690 Not public and general	1693 c. 89; 1693 c. 42	15 June 1693
Act Salvo Jure Cujuslibet. Act Salvo Jure Cujuslibet.
Adjournment Act 1693 (repealed)	Vol. IX, p. 346; 1693 c. 43	15 June 1693
Act of adjournment. Act of adjournment. (Repealed by Statute Law Revision (Scotland) Act 1906 (6 Edw. 7. c. 38))

=== Sources ===
- Alexander, William (1841). "Acta Parliamentorum Gulielmi et Mariæ". An Abridgement of the Acts of the Parliaments of Scotland. Edinburgh: Adam and Charles Black. pp. A79 – A80 – via Google Books.
- Alexander, William (1841). "Acta Parliamentorum Gulielmi et Mariæ". An Abridgement of the Acts of the Parliaments of Scotland. Edinburgh: Adam and Charles Black. pp. A79 – A80 – via Google Books.
- Chronological Table of the Statutes. London: Her Majesty's Stationery Office. 1972. pp. 1362–1363 – via Google Books.
- "Acts of the Old Scottish Parliament: 1693". legislation.gov.uk. The National Archives.
- "Index of Statutes: Index of Statutes: William II and Mary II (1689-1694)". Records of the Parliaments of Scotland to 1707. University of St Andrews.

== See also ==
- List of legislation in the United Kingdom
- Records of the Parliaments of Scotland
