= List of acts of the Parliament of Scotland from 1701 =

This is a list of acts of the Parliament of Scotland for the year 1701.

It lists acts of Parliament of the old Parliament of Scotland, that was merged with the old Parliament of England to form the Parliament of Great Britain, by the Union with England Act 1707 (c. 7).

For other years, see list of acts of the Parliament of Scotland. For the period after 1707, see list of acts of the Parliament of Great Britain.

== 1701 ==
Continuing the 9th session of the parliament of William II, held in Edinburgh from 29 October 1700 until 1 February 1701.

Short title, or popular name	Citation	Royal assent
Long title
Criminal Procedure Act 1701 still in force	1701 c. 6 (Note: This is the citation in the Record Edition.) (Note: This is the citation in the Duodecimal Edition.)	31 January 1701
Act for preventing wrongous Imprisonments and against undue delayes in Tryals. (Note: The title is sometimes rendered as "Act for preventing wrongful imprisonment and against undue delays in trials")
King's Prerogative Act 1701 (repealed)	1701 c. 7	31 January 1701
Act Rescinding the Act of Parliament 1693 asserting the Kings prerogative in the ordering of Trade. (Repealed by Statute Law Revision (Scotland) Act 1906 (6 Edw. 7. c. 38))
Foreign Wool Act 1701 (repealed)	1701 c. 8	31 January 1701
Act Discharging the importing and wearing of Forreign Woollen Manufacture. (Repealed by Statute Law Revision (Scotland) Act 1906 (6 Edw. 7. c. 38))
Export of Wool Act 1701 (repealed)	1701 c. 9	31 January 1701
Act Dischargeing the Exportation of Wool. (Repealed by Statute Law Revision (Scotland) Act 1906 (6 Edw. 7. c. 38))
Ogilvie's Estate Act 1701 Not public and general	1701 c. 10 — (Note: This act is not listed in the Duodecimal Edition.)	31 January 1701
Act in favors of Sir Patrick Ogilvie of Boyne and James Ogilvie his son anent their Marble.
French Wines Act 1701 (repealed)	1701 c. 11; 1701 c. 10	31 January 1701
Act Dischargeing Wine Brandie and all other Liqours of the grouth of France. (Repealed by Statute Law Revision (Scotland) Act 1906 (6 Edw. 7. c. 38))
Profaneness Act 1701 (repealed)	1701 c. 12; 1701 c. 11	31 January 1701
Act against Profaneness. (Repealed by Statute Law Revision (Scotland) Act 1906 (6 Edw. 7. c. 38))
Import of Silks Act 1701 (repealed)	1701 c. 13; 1701 c. 12	31 January 1701
Act prohibiteing the Importing of Silk Stuffs and others. (Repealed by Statute Law Revision (Scotland) Act 1906 (6 Edw. 7. c. 38))
Company of Scotland Act 1701 (repealed)	1701 c. 14; 1701 c. 13	31 January 1701
Act in favors of the African and Indian Company. (Repealed by Statute Law Revision (Scotland) Act 1906 (6 Edw. 7. c. 38))
Quots of Testaments Act 1701 (repealed)	1701 c. 15; 1701 c. 14	31 January 1701
Act Discharging the Quots of Testaments. (Repealed by Statute Law Revision (Scotland) Act 1906 (6 Edw. 7. c. 38))
Supply Act 1701 (repealed)	1701 c. 16; 1701 c. 15	31 January 1701
Act for a Supply of Twelve Moneths Cess upon the Land Rent. (Repealed by Statute Law Revision (Scotland) Act 1906 (6 Edw. 7. c. 38))
Not public and general	1701 c. 17 —	31 January 1701
Act for proveing the tenor of some writs in favors of Sir David Home of Crossrig.
Not public and general	1701 c. 18 —	31 January 1701
Ratification in favors of John Marques of Atholl and John Earl of Tullibardin his son dissolving from the Crown the Minerals within the Earldom of Athol.
Not public and general	1701 c. 19 —	31 January 1701
Ratification in favors of John Earl of Erroll of the Regality of Slains.
Not public and general	1701 c. 20 —	31 January 1701
Ratification in favors of William Earl of March dissolving from the Crown the Minerals within the Lordship of Neidpeth, and of the Lands of Glenrath.
Not public and general	1701 c. 21 —	31 January 1701
Ratification in favors of Sir Hugh Dalrymple of Northberwick of the Lands and Barony of Northberwick.
Not public and general	1701 c. 22 —	31 January 1701
Ratification in favors of Sir James Murray of Philiphaugh and John Murray his son of the Barony of Philiphaugh.
Not public and general	1701 c. 23 —	31 January 1701
Ratification in favors of Sir James Scou gall of Whitehill of the Touns and Lands of over and nether Boddome.
Not public and general	1701 c. 24 —	31 January 1701
Ratification in favors of George Carruthers of Holmainds of the Lands and Barony of Holmainds.
Not public and general	1701 c. 25 —	31 January 1701
Ratification in favors of William Hairstains of Craigs of the Lands and Barony of Craigs.
Not public and general	1701 c. 26 —	31 January 1701
Ratification in favors of George Logan of Burncastle of Lands in Wester Dudingstoun.
Not public and general	1701 c. 27 —	31 January 1701
Ratification of a Contract betwixt the Burghs of Glasgow and Dumbartoun anent their rights and privileges to the river of Clyde.
Not public and general	1701 c. 28 —	31 January 1701
Act in favours of Ann Dutches of Hamilton for altering three yearly fairs at the burgh of Hamilton.
Not public and general	1701 c. 29 —	31 January 1701
Act in favors of Ann Dutches of Buccleugh and James Earl of Dalkeith her Son for two yearly fairs at the Toun of Langholm.
Not public and general	1701 c. 30 —	31 January 1701
Act in favors of Archibald Earl of Argyle for two yearly fairs at the Kirktoun of Dollar.
Not public and general	1701 c. 31 —	31 January 1701
Act in favors of James Earl of Linlithgow and Callendar for two yearly fairs at the Burgh of Falkirk.
Not public and general	1701 c. 32 —	31 January 1701
Act in favors of James Earl of Southesk for two yearly fairs and a weekly mercat at the kirktoun of Kennell.
Not public and general	1701 c. 33 —	31 January 1701
Act in favors of James Viscount of Seafield for two yearly fairs at the Muir of Keith.
Not public and general	1701 c. 34 —	31 January 1701
Act in favors of Sir Colin Campbell of Aberruchill for a yearly fair at the Burgh of Barony of Inveruchill.
Not public and general	1701 c. 35 —	31 January 1701
Act in favors of Sir Archibald Stuart of Blackhall for a yearly fair at the old kirk of Inuerkip.
Not public and general	1701 c. 36 —	31 January 1701
Act in favors of Sir Patrick Murray of Ochtertyre for a yearly fair at the Muir of Laggan.
Not public and general	1701 c. 37 —	31 January 1701
Act in favors of Sir James Abercrombie of Birkinboig for two yearly fairs upon the lands of Breoch.
Not public and general	1701 c. 38 —	31 January 1701
Act in favors of Alexander Stuart of Torrens for a yearly fair and weekly mercat at the Kirktoun of Kilbride.
Not public and general	1701 c. 39 —	31 January 1701
Act in favors of James Moir of Stoniewood for two yearly fairs at the Greenburn on the Lands of Stoniewood
Not public and general	1701 c. 40 —	31 January 1701
Act in favors of George Winrahame of Eymouth for two yearly fairs and a weekly mercat at the toun of Eymouth.
Not public and general	1701 c. 41 —	31 January 1701
Act in favors of Alexander Gibson of Durie for changing three yearly fairs and a weekly mercat at the toun of Leven.
Not public and general	1701 c. 42 —	31 January 1701
Act in favors of Mr Alexander Abercrombie of Tullibody Advocat for two yearly fairs and a weekly mercat at the toun of Tullibody.
Not public and general	1701 c. 43 —	31 January 1701
Act in favors of John Cunninghame of Ballandalloch for two yearly fairs and a weekly mercat at the Clachan of Balfron .
Not public and general	1701 c. 44 —	31 January 1701
Act in favors of John Farquharson of Invercauld for two yearly fairs at the Mill toun of Invercauld.
Not public and general	1701 c. 45 —	31 January 1701
Act in favors of James Ramsay for a yearly fair at the Newtoun of Blairgourie.
Not public and general	1701 c. 46 —	31 January 1701
Act in favors of the Burgh of Air for yearly fair.
Not public and general	1701 c. 47 —	31 January 1701
Act in favors of the Burgh of Dumferm ling for a yearly fair.
Not public and general	1701 c. 48 —	1 February 1701
Act in favors of John Earl of Loudoun two yearly fairs at the toun of Mauchline.
Not public and general	1701 c. 49 —	1 February 1701
Act in favors of John Viscount of Stair granting and changing certain yearly fairs at the Burgh of Barony of Dalmellingtoun.
Not public and general	1701 c. 50 —	1 February 1701
Act in favors of William Morison of Prestoungrange for yearly fairs and weekly mercats at Morisons haven & on the lands of Muirfort.
Not public and general	1701 c. 51 —	1 February 1701
Act in favors of Thomas Forbes of Watertoun for two yearly fairs at the Kirktoun of Ellon.
Not public and general	1701 c. 52 —	1 February 1701
Act in favors of John Forbes of Bonnakettle for two yearly fairs at the toun of Bonnakettle.
Supply (No. 2) Act 1701 (repealed)	1701 c. 53; 1701 c. 16	1 February 1701
Act and Commission anent the Pole 1693. (Repealed by Statute Law Revision (Scotland) Act 1906 (6 Edw. 7. c. 38))
Saving the Rights Act 1701 Not public and general	1701 c. 54; 1701 c. 17	1 February 1701
Act Salvo Jure Cujuslibet.
Adjournment Act 1701 (repealed)	Vol X, p. 341; 1701 c. 18	1 February 1701
Act of adjournment. (Repealed by Statute Law Revision (Scotland) Act 1906 (6 Edw. 7. c. 38))

=== Sources ===
- Alexander, William (1841). "Acta Parliamentorum Guliemi et Mariæ". An Abridgement of the Acts of the Parliaments of Scotland. Edinburgh: Adam and Charles Black. pp. 520–521 – via Google Books.
- Alexander, William (1841). "Acta Parliamentorum Guliemi et Mariæ". An Abridgement of the Acts of the Parliaments of Scotland. Edinburgh: Adam and Charles Black. pp. 520–521 – via Google Books.
- Chronological Table of the Statutes. London: Her Majesty's Stationery Office. 1972. p. 1367 – via Google Books.
- "Acts of the Old Scottish Parliament: 1701". legislation.gov.uk. The National Archives.
- "Index of Statutes: William II (1694-1702)". Records of the Parliaments of Scotland to 1707. University of St Andrews.

== See also ==
- List of legislation in the United Kingdom
- Records of the Parliaments of Scotland
