= List of acts of the Parliament of Scotland from 1587 =

This is a list of acts of the Parliament of Scotland for the year 1587.

It lists acts of Parliament of the old Parliament of Scotland, that was merged with the old Parliament of England to form the Parliament of Great Britain, by the Union with England Act 1707 (c. 7).

For other years, see list of acts of the Parliament of Scotland. For the period after 1707, see list of acts of the Parliament of Great Britain.

== 1587 ==
The 11th parliament of James VI, held at Holyrood House from the 8 July 1587.

Short title, or popular name	Citation	Royal assent
Long title
Kings's Majority Act 1587 (repealed)	1587 c. 1 (Note: This is the citation in the Record Edition.); 1587 c. 22 (Note: This is the citation in the Duodecimal Edition.) (Note: This act is not listed in the Duodecimal Edition.)	29 July 1587
Declaratioun of oure Soverane Lordis perfite aige. (Repealed by Statute Law Revision (Scotland) Act 1906 (6 Edw. 7. c. 38))
Church Act 1587 (repealed)	1587 c. 2; 1587 c. 23	29 July 1587
Ratificatioun of the libertie of the kirk of God. (Repealed by Statute Law Revision (Scotland) Act 1906 (6 Edw. 7. c. 38))
Religion Act 1587 (repealed)	1587 c. 3; 1587 c. 24	29 July 1587
Anent tryall and punishement of the offences of the adversaris of the trew religioun presentlie professit within this realme. (Repealed by Statute Law Revision (Scotland) Act 1906 (6 Edw. 7. c. 38))
Papal Books Act 1587 (repealed)	1587 c. 4; 1587 c. 25	29 July 1587
Aganis sellaris and dispersaris of papisticall and erroneous buikis. (Repealed by Statute Law Revision (Scotland) Act 1906 (6 Edw. 7. c. 38))
Benefices Act 1587 (repealed)	1587 c. 5; 1587 c. 26	29 July 1587
Releif of the ministrie of the first fructis and fyft penny of all benefices of cuir under prelaciis. (Repealed by Statute Law Revision (Scotland) Act 1906 (6 Edw. 7. c. 38))
Disorders in Church Act 1587 (repealed)	1587 c. 6; 1587 c. 27	29 July 1587
For punishment of the committaris of disordouris in the kirk in tyme of divine service or forcearis of ministeris in thair office and functioun. (Repealed by Statute Law Revision (Scotland) Act 1964 (c. 80))
Dilapidations Act 1587 (repealed)	1587 c. 7; 1587 c. 28	29 July 1587
Anent proceiding in deprivatioun for the causis of dilapidatioun. (Repealed by Statute Law Revision (Scotland) Act 1906 (6 Edw. 7. c. 38))
Not public and general	1587 c. 8; 1587 c. 29	29 July 1587
Annexatioun of the temporalities of benefices to the crown.
Coin Act 1587 (repealed)	1587 c. 9 —	29 July 1587
Commissioun anent the cunye. (Repealed by Statute Law Revision (Scotland) Act 1906 (6 Edw. 7. c. 38))
King's Marriage Act 1587 (repealed)	1587 c. 10 —	29 July 1587
Commissioun for the taxatioun to be grantit quhen it sall pleis that oure Souerane lord sall treat and conclude upon his mariage. (Repealed by Statute Law Revision (Scotland) Act 1906 (6 Edw. 7. c. 38))
Measures and Weights Act 1587 (repealed)	1587 c. 11 —	29 July 1587
Commissioun toward the establishing of ane universall mett mesour and wecht. (Repealed by Statute Law Revision (Scotland) Act 1906 (6 Edw. 7. c. 38))
Clergy Liferents Act 1587 (repealed)	1587 c. 12 —	29 July 1587
Commissioun for satisfactioun of the clergie for thair lyverentis. (Repealed by Statute Law Revision (Scotland) Act 1906 (6 Edw. 7. c. 38))
Not public and general	1587 c. 13; 1587 c. 30	29 July 1587
Dissolutioun of the unioun of landis annext for setting of the samyn in fewferme.
King's Revocation Act 1587 (repealed)	1587 c. 14; 1587 c. 31	29 July 1587
The Kingis Majesties generall revocatioun. (Repealed by Statute Law Revision (Scotland) Act 1906 (6 Edw. 7. c. 38))
Non Resident Ministers Act 1587 (repealed)	1587 c. 15; 1587 c. 32	29 July 1587
For explanatioun of the Commissioun gevin to proceid aganis non residentis. (Repealed by Statute Law Revision (Scotland) Act 1906 (6 Edw. 7. c. 38))
Parliament Act 1587 (repealed)	1587 c. 16; 1587 cc. 33-40	29 July 1587
Anent the Parliament. (Repealed by Statute Law Revision (Scotland) Act 1906 (6 Edw. 7. c. 38))
Parliament (No. 2) Act 1587 (repealed)	1587 c. 17; 1587 c. 41	29 July 1587
Aganis querrelling for priorities of place or vote in parliament. (Repealed by Statute Law Revision (Scotland) Act 1906 (6 Edw. 7. c. 38))
Parliament (No. 3) Act 1587 (repealed)	1587 c. 18 —	29 July 1587
Commissioun anent prioritie of places and voiting in parliament. (Repealed by Statute Law Revision (Scotland) Act 1906 (6 Edw. 7. c. 38))
Privy Council Act 1587 (repealed)	1587 c. 19 —	29 July 1587
Anent oure soverane lordis privie counsall. (Repealed by Statute Law Revision (Scotland) Act 1906 (6 Edw. 7. c. 38))
College of Justice Act 1587 (repealed)	1587 c. 20 —	29 July 1587
Act in favour of the sessioun for ratificatioun of thair privileges. (Repealed by Statute Law Revision (Scotland) Act 1906 (6 Edw. 7. c. 38))
Lords of Session Act 1587 (repealed)	1587 c. 21 —	29 July 1587
Act in favour of sic of the lordis of sessioun as sall becum ageit and unhable. (Repealed by Statute Law Revision (Scotland) Act 1906 (6 Edw. 7. c. 38))
Not public and general	1587 c. 22 —	29 July 1587
Act in favour of maister Alexander Dunbar deane of Murray ane of the senatouris of the College of Justice.
Court of Session Act 1587 (repealed)	1587 c. 23; 1587 c. 42	29 July 1587
Ratificatioun of the act of the lordis of Counsall and Sessioun anent proceiding in caussis of molestatioun. (Repealed by Statute Law Revision (Scotland) Act 1906 (6 Edw. 7. c. 38))
Vexatious Litigants Act 1587 (repealed)	1587 c. 24; 1587 c. 43	29 July 1587
Aganis wilfull and malitious pleyaris. (Repealed by Statute Law Revision (Scotland) Act 1906 (6 Edw. 7. c. 38))
Court of Session (No. 2) Act 1587 (repealed)	1587 c. 25 —	29 July 1587
Anent the sitting and vacance of the Sessioun. (Repealed by Statute Law Revision (Scotland) Act 1906 (6 Edw. 7. c. 38))
Court of Session (No. 3) Act 1587 (repealed)	1587 c. 26 —	29 July 1587
Act of certane materis remittit to the lordis of Counsall and Sessioun. (Repealed by Statute Law Revision (Scotland) Act 1906 (6 Edw. 7. c. 38))
Court of Session (No. 4) Act 1587 (repealed)	1587 c. 27; 1587 c. 44	29 July 1587
Act remitting the interpretatioun of the law of oblivioun to the lordis of Sessioun. (Repealed by Statute Law Revision (Scotland) Act 1906 (6 Edw. 7. c. 38))
Privy Council (No. 2) Act 1587 (repealed)	1587 c. 28 —	29 July 1587
Act of certane materis remittit to the Secreit Counsall. (Repealed by Statute Law Revision (Scotland) Act 1906 (6 Edw. 7. c. 38))
Notaries Act 1587 (repealed)	1587 c. 29; 1587 c. 45	29 July 1587
For remeid of the falsset and ignorance of sindrie notaris. (Repealed by Statute Law Revision (Scotland) Act 1906 (6 Edw. 7. c. 38))
Officers of Arms Act 1587 (repealed)	1587 c. 30; 1587 c. 46	29 July 1587
For reformatioun of the extraordiner nowmer and monyfauld abuses of officiaris of Armes. (Repealed by Debtors (Scotland) Act 1987 (c. 18))
Supersederes Act 1587 (repealed)	1587 c. 31; 1587 c. 47	29 July 1587
Aganis supersedereis. (Repealed by Statute Law Revision (Scotland) Act 1906 (6 Edw. 7. c. 38))
Teinds Act 1587 (repealed)	1587 c. 32; 1587 c. 48	29 July 1587
Act in favour of the laubouraris of the ground troublit be teynding. (Repealed by Statute Law Revision (Scotland) Act 1906 (6 Edw. 7. c. 38))
Treason Act 1587 (repealed)	1587 c. 33; 1587 c. 49	29 July 1587
Anent accusatioun in crymes of tressoun. (Repealed by Statute Law Revision (Scotland) Act 1906 (6 Edw. 7. c. 38))
Treason (No. 2) Act 1587 (repealed)	1587 c. 34; 1587 cc. 50-51	29 July 1587
Certane crymes declairit to be tressoun in tyme cuming. (Repealed by Statute Law Revision (Scotland) Act 1906 (6 Edw. 7. c. 38))
Usury Act 1587 (repealed)	1587 c. 35; 1587 c. 52	29 July 1587
Act concerning the punisement of usury. (Repealed by Statute Law Revision (Scotland) Act 1906 (6 Edw. 7. c. 38))
Wine and Timber Act 1587 (repealed)	1587 c. 36; 1587 c. 53	29 July 1587
For stancheing of derth and first for making of the prices of wyne and tymmer. (Repealed by Statute Law Revision (Scotland) Act 1906 (6 Edw. 7. c. 38))
Tolls Act 1587 still in force	1587 c. 37; 1587 c. 54	29 July 1587
Aganis extraordiner impositionis layed vpoun victuallis.
Forestallers Act 1587 (repealed)	1587 c. 38 —	29 July 1587
For punishement of foirstalleris and regraiteris. (Repealed by Statute Law Revision (Scotland) Act 1906 (6 Edw. 7. c. 38))
Export of Victuals Act 1587 (repealed)	1587 c. 39; 1587 c. 55	29 July 1587
Aganis transporting of victuallis or keping of the same to derth. (Repealed by Statute Law Revision (Scotland) Act 1906 (6 Edw. 7. c. 38))
Horses Act 1587 (repealed)	1587 c. 40; 1587 c. 56	29 July 1587
Aganis keping of horssis at hard meit in symmer. (Repealed by Statute Law Revision (Scotland) Act 1906 (6 Edw. 7. c. 38))
Sea Fishing Act 1587 (repealed)	1587 c. 41; 1587 c. 57	29 July 1587
Anent victualling of schippis passand to the north fischeingis. (Repealed by Statute Law Revision (Scotland) Act 1906 (6 Edw. 7. c. 38))
Lent Act 1587 (repealed)	1587 c. 42; 1587 c. 58	29 July 1587
Aganis eitting of flesche in lentren and uther dayes forbiddin. (Repealed by Statute Law Revision (Scotland) Act 1906 (6 Edw. 7. c. 38))
Game Act 1587 (repealed)	1587 c. 43; 1587 c. 59	29 July 1587
Aganis slayeris of deir and utheris wyld beastis. (Repealed by Statute Law Revision (Scotland) Act 1964 (c. 80))
Brieves Act 1587 (repealed)	1587 c. 44; 1587 c. 64	29 July 1587
Anent Proclamatioun for serving of breves. (Repealed by Statute Law Revision (Scotland) Act 1906 (6 Edw. 7. c. 38))
Payment to Factors Act 1587 (repealed)	1587 c. 45 —	29 July 1587
Act in favour of personis that hes maid payment bona fide to factouris. (Repealed by Statute Law Revision (Scotland) Act 1906 (6 Edw. 7. c. 38))
Commendator of Kelso Act 1587 (repealed)	1587 c. 46 —	29 July 1587
Act authorizand the subscriptionis of commendataris allane that wantis conventis;. (Repealed by Statute Law Revision (Scotland) Act 1906 (6 Edw. 7. c. 38))
Patronage Act 1587 (repealed)	1587 c. 47; 1587 c. 61	29 July 1587
Act in favour of laic patronis for redemptioun of thair patronages. (Repealed by Statute Law Revision (Scotland) Act 1906 (6 Edw. 7. c. 38))
Gifts of Pensions Act 1587 (repealed)	1587 c. 48; 1587 c. 62	29 July 1587
Anent counterfait and invalide giftis of pensionis. (Repealed by Statute Law Revision (Scotland) Act 1906 (6 Edw. 7. c. 38))
Exchequer Act 1587 (repealed)	1587 c. 49; 1587 c. 63	29 July 1587
Anent oure souerane lordis Chekker. (Repealed by Statute Law Revision (Scotland) Act 1906 (6 Edw. 7. c. 38))
Sasines Act 1587 (repealed)	1587 c. 50; 1587 c. 64	29 July 1587
Anent the presenting of seisingis yeirlie to the Chekker. (Repealed by Statute Law Revision (Scotland) Act 1906 (6 Edw. 7. c. 38))
Exchequer (No. 2) Act 1587 (repealed)	1587 c. 51 —	29 July 1587
Act of certane materis remittit to the Chekker. (Repealed by Statute Law Revision (Scotland) Act 1906 (6 Edw. 7. c. 38))
Crown Lands Act 1587 (repealed)	1587 c. 52; 1587 cc. 65-69	29 July 1587
Concerning our souerane Lordis propirtie. (Repealed by Statute Law Revision (Scotland) Act 1906 (6 Edw. 7. c. 38))
Crown-wadsets Act 1587 (repealed)	1587 c. 53 —	29 July 1587
Anent the wodseting of the kingis propertie. (Repealed by Statute Law Revision (Scotland) Act 1906 (6 Edw. 7. c. 38))
Jurors Act 1587	1587 c. 54; 1587 cc. 75 and 77	29 July 1587
For the help and augmentatioun of the kingis Maiesties rentis in his thesaurarie and casualities.
Ratifications Act 1587 (repealed)	1587 c. 55 —	29 July 1587
Act in favour of the thesaurair anent expeiding of Ratificatiounis. (Repealed by Statute Law Revision (Scotland) Act 1906 (6 Edw. 7. c. 38))
King's Peace Act 1587 (repealed)	1587 c. 56 —	29 July 1587
For universall concord amangis the kingis liegis. (Repealed by Statute Law Revision (Scotland) Act 1906 (6 Edw. 7. c. 38))
Criminal Justice Act 1587 (repealed)	1587 c. 57; 1587 cc. 91 and 92	29 July 1587
For the furtherance and furthsetting of the criminall iustice ower all the Realme.
King's Peace (No. 2) Act 1587 (repealed)	1587 c. 59; 1587 cc. 93-110	29 July 1587
For the quieting and keping in obedience of the disorderit subjectis inhabitantis of the bordouris hielandis and ilis. (Repealed by Statute Law Revision (Scotland) Act 1906 (6 Edw. 7. c. 38))
Pacification Act 1587 (repealed)	1587 c. 60 —	29 July 1587
Ratificatioun of the pacificatioun restitutioun and abolitioun grantit to oure soverane lordis liegis at divers parliamentis befoir. (Repealed by Statute Law Revision (Scotland) Act 1906 (6 Edw. 7. c. 38))
Not public and general	1587 c. 61 —	29 July 1587
Ratificatioun of the act tueching the decreit of redemptioun of the landis of Woddislie.
Not public and general	1587 c. 62 —	29 July 1587
Act in favour of the noblemen being with the kingis Majestie at Striviling.
Not public and general	1587 c. 63 —	29 July 1587
Ratificatioun to the erle of Angus of the eridome of Mortoun.
Not public and general	1587 c. 64 —	29 July 1587
Submissioun of the contraversie betuix the erle of Angus and lord Flemyng.
Not public and general	1587 c. 65 —	29 July 1587
Act in favour of the erle of Huntlie concerning his provisioun to Dumfermling.
Not public and general	1587 c. 66 —	29 July 1587
Act annulling the richtis and titillis of the landis and rentis of Dumfermling maid be the maister of Gray with certane exceptionis.
Not public and general	1587 c. 67 —	29 July 1587
Ratificatioun to the erle of Craufurd.
Not public and general	1587 c. 68 —	29 July 1587
Act betuix the erle of Crawfurde and the burgh of Dundie.
Not public and general	1587 c. 69 —	29 July 1587
Act in favour of Frances erle Bothueil.
Not public and general	1587 c. 70 —	29 July 1587
Act in favour of the erle of Montrois.
Not public and general	1587 c. 71 —	29 July 1587
Act in favour of the erle of Mar.
Not public and general	1587 c. 72 —	29 July 1587
Act betuix the countesse of Mar Hary Lindesay of Carraldstoun and William Stewart of Seytoun.
Not public and general	1587 c. 73 —	29 July 1587
Submissioun betuix the countesse of Murray and the laird of Pettarro.
Not public and general	1587 c. 74 —	29 July 1587
Ratificatioun to the erle of Gowrie.
Not public and general	1587 c. 75 —	29 July 1587
Act in favour of the Maister of Eglintoun.
Not public and general	1587 c. 76 —	29 July 1587
Act in favour of the Justice clerk tueching the recognitioun of Uchiltrie.
Churchmen's Warrandice Act 1587 (repealed)	1587 c. 77; 1587 c. 111	29 July 1587
Act assolyeand kirkmen fra warrandice except thair awin deid. (Repealed by Statute Law Revision (Scotland) Act 1906 (6 Edw. 7. c. 38))
Not public and general	1587 c. 78 —	29 July 1587
Act in favour of Patrik archiebischop of Sanctandrois.
Not public and general	1587 c. 79 —	29 July 1587
Act in favour of Patrik archiebischop of Sanctandrois.
Not public and general	1587 c. 80 —	29 July 1587
Act in favour of Claude commendatair of Paislay for Cambuslang.
Not public and general	1587 c. 81 —	29 July 1587
Act in favour of Walter commendatair of Blantyre kepare of the privie seill.
Not public and general	1587 c. 82 —	29 July 1587
Act in favour of maister Eduart Bruce advocat tueching the abbay of Kinlos.
Not public and general	1587 c. 83 —	29 July 1587
Ratificatioun to Alexander lait commendatair of Pluscardin.
Not public and general	1587 c. 84 —	29 July 1587
Act in favour of the pensioneris of the archiebischoprik of Sanctandrois.
Not public and general	1587 c. 85 —	29 July 1587
Ratificatioun to the commendatair Scone.
Not public and general	1587 c. 86 —	29 July 1587
Act in favour of maister James Halyburtoun.
Not public and general	1587 c. 87 —	29 July 1587
Act in favour of the College of Glasgw.
Not public and general	1587 c. 88 —	29 July 1587
Ratificatioun to the new College of Sanctandrois.
Not public and general	1587 c. 89 —	29 July 1587
Act anent the personage of Duns.
Not public and general	1587 c. 90 —	29 July 1587
Act in favour of maister Dauid Lindsay minister at Leyth.
Not public and general	1587 c. 91 —	29 July 1587
Ratificatioun to Thomas Hudsoun musiciane.
Not public and general	1587 c. 92 —	29 July 1587
Anent the benefices presentit be the erle of Orknay.
Not public and general	1587 c. 93 —	29 July 1587
Ratificatioun of the office of chancellary to Sir Johnne Maitland of Thirlstane knicht.
Not public and general	1587 c. 94 —	29 July 1587
Ratificatioun of the infeftmentis of Sir Johnne Maitland of Thirlstane knicht chancellair.
Not public and general	1587 c. 95 —	29 July 1587
Ratificatioun to Maister Peter Young of Seytoun.
Not public and general	1587 c. 96 —	29 July 1587
Ratificatioun to Sir Patrik Waus of Barinbarrauch knycht presentlie ane of the kingis ambassadouris in Denmark.
Not public and general	1587 c. 97 —	29 July 1587
Ratificatioun to maister George Young of the archidenry of Sanctandrois.
Not public and general	1587 c. 98 —	29 July 1587
Ratificatioun to maister George Young and Johnne Andro.
Not public and general	1587 c. 99 —	29 July 1587
Act in favour of the ladie Burly and hir bairnis.
Not public and general	1587 c. 100 —	29 July 1587
Act in favour of the lady Burlie concerning landis gevin for castellis.
Not public and general	1587 c. 101 —	29 July 1587
Act in favour of the lady Burlie tueching the privilege of refynit salt.
Not public and general	1587 c. 102 —	29 July 1587
Act in favour of Johnne Achesoun.
Not public and general	1587 c. 103 —	29 July 1587
Act concerning the airis of Edwart To scheoch of Monywaird.
Not public and general	1587 c. 104 —	29 July 1587
Act in favour of James and Johnne Menyeiss.
Not public and general	1587 c. 105 —	29 July 1587
Act remitting the larde of Durryis supplicatioun to the kingis majestie.
Not public and general	1587 c. 106 —	29 July 1587
Act in favour of the laird of Rossyth.
Not public and general	1587 c. 107 —	29 July 1587
Act in favour of James Stewart sone to the umquhill erle of Buchane.
Not public and general	1587 c. 108 —	29 July 1587
Act in favour of Dauid Fergussoun of Glenschyroch.
Burghs (No. 1) Act 1587 (repealed)	1587 c. 109; 1587 c. 112	29 July 1587
Anent taxatioun of burrowis. (Repealed by Statute Law Revision (Scotland) Act 1906 (6 Edw. 7. c. 38))
Not public and general	1587 c. 110 —	29 July 1587
Ratificatioun to the burgh of Edinburgh.
Not public and general	1587 c. 111 —	29 July 1587
Ratificatioun to the burgh of Perth.
Not public and general	1587 c. 112 —	29 July 1587
Ratificatioun to the burgh of Montrois.
Not public and general	1587 c. 113 —	29 July 1587
Commissioun in favour of the citie of Glasgow.
Burghs Act 1587 still in force	1587 c. 114; 1587 c. 113	29 July 1587
Act inhibiting the burrowis to sell or dispone thair fredomes without consent of the estates in parliament.
Not public and general	1587 c. 115 —	29 July 1587
Act in favour of the goldsmythis.
Not public and general	1587 c. 116 —	29 July 1587
Ratificatioun to the burgh of Brint Iland.
Not public and general	1587 c. 117 —	29 July 1587
Act in favour of the burgh of Carraill.
Not public and general	1587 c. 118 —	29 July 1587
Act in favour of the toun of Anstruther.
Not public and general	1587 c. 119 —	29 July 1587
Act in favour of the craftismen Flemyngis.
Barons in Parliament Act 1587 (repealed)	1587 c. 120; 1587 c. 114	29 July 1587
The kingis Majesties declaratioun concerning the voittis of small baronis in Parliament and instrumentis takin be the erle of Craufurde and the laird of Tullybardin. (Repealed by Statute Law Revision (Scotland) Act 1906 (6 Edw. 7. c. 38))
Not public and general	1587 c. 121 —	29 July 1587
Act in favouris of Mark lord Newbottill.
Not public and general	1587 c. 122 —	29 July 1587
Act in favour of the young laird of Kynfawnis.
Defence of the Realm Act 1587 (repealed)	1587 c. 123 —	29 July 1587
Commissioun to treat for defence of the realme in tyme of weare. (Repealed by Statute Law Revision (Scotland) Act 1906 (6 Edw. 7. c. 38))
Supply Act 1587 (repealed)	1587 c. 124 —	29 July 1587
Commissioun for setting of the ordour of the taxatioun on all estatitis. (Repealed by Statute Law Revision (Scotland) Act 1906 (6 Edw. 7. c. 38))
Bullion Act 1587 (repealed)	1587 c. 125 —	29 July 1587
Commissioun for setting of the quantitie of the bulyeoun to be brocht to the cunyehous of all custumat guidis. (Repealed by Statute Law Revision (Scotland) Act 1906 (6 Edw. 7. c. 38))
Not public and general	1587 c. 126 —	29 July 1587
Act in favour of the toun of Dalkeyth.
Not public and general	1587 c. 127 —	29 July 1587
Act in favour of the toun of Polwart.
Not public and general	1587 c. 128 —	29 July 1587
Commissioun anent the brig of Done.
Not public and general	1587 c. 129 —	29 July 1587
Commissioun anent the brig of Crawmound.
Not public and general	1587 c. 130 —	29 July 1587
Commissioun anent the brig of Air.
Not public and general	1587 c. 131 —	29 July 1587
Commissioun anent the brig of Irwing.
Administration of Justice Act 1587 (repealed)	1587 c. 132 —	29 July 1587
Commissioun for the article anent the better executioun of justice. (Repealed by Statute Law Revision (Scotland) Act 1906 (6 Edw. 7. c. 38))
Commission on Law Act 1587 (repealed)	1587 c. 133 —	29 July 1587
Commissioun to considder the lawis of this present and the last parliamentis. (Repealed by Statute Law Revision (Scotland) Act 1906 (6 Edw. 7. c. 38))
Not public and general	1587 c. 134 —	29 July 1587
Act in favouris of maister Henrie Keir.
Commission on Prices of Food Act 1587 (repealed)	1587 c. 135 —	29 July 1587
Commissioun to treat on the conformitie of prices of all victuallis and merchandice imperfect. (Repealed by Statute Law Revision (Scotland) Act 1906 (6 Edw. 7. c. 38))
Measures and Weights Act 1587 (repealed)	1587 c. 136; 1587 c. 115	29 July 1587
Mesuris and wechtis and the just quanti tie thairof. (Repealed by Statute Law Revision (Scotland) Act 1906 (6 Edw. 7. c. 38))

=== Sources ===
- Alexander, William (1841). "Acta Parliamentorum Regis Jacobi Sexti". An Abridgement of the Acts of the Parliaments of Scotland. Edinburgh: Adam and Charles Black. pp. A29 – A31 – via Google Books.
- Alexander, William (1841). "Acta Parliamentorum Regis Jacobi Sexti". An Abridgement of the Acts of the Parliaments of Scotland. Edinburgh: Adam and Charles Black. pp. A29 – A31 – via Google Books.
- Chronological Table of the Statutes. London: Her Majesty's Stationery Office. 1972. pp. 1339–1341 – via Google Books.
- "Acts of the Old Scottish Parliament: 1587". legislation.gov.uk. The National Archives.
- "Index of Statutes: James VI (1567-1625)". Records of the Parliaments of Scotland to 1707. University of St Andrews.

== See also ==
- List of legislation in the United Kingdom
- Records of the Parliaments of Scotland
