= History of Scotland =

The recorded history of Scotland begins with the arrival of the Roman Empire in the 1st century, when the province of Britannia reached the Antonine Wall. North of this was Caledonia, inhabited by the Picti, whose uprisings forced Rome's legions south to Hadrian's Wall. As Rome withdrew from Britain, a Gaelic tribe from Ireland called the Scoti began colonising Western Scotland. Before Roman times, prehistoric Scotland entered the Neolithic Era about 4000 BC, the Bronze Age about 2000 BC, and the Iron Age around 700 BC.

The Gaelic kingdom of Dál Riata was founded on the west coast of Scotland in the 6th century. In the following century, Irish missionaries introduced the pagan Picts to Celtic Christianity. Following England's Gregorian mission, the Pictish king Nechtan abolished most Celtic practices in favour of the Roman Rite, restricting Gaelic influence on his kingdom and avoiding war with Anglian Northumbria. Viking invasions began towards the end of the 8th century, forcing the Picts and Gaels to cease their hostility to each other and to unite in the 9th century, forming the Kingdom of Scotland.

The kingdom was united under the House of Alpin, whose members fought among each other during frequent disputed successions. The last Alpin king, Malcolm II, died without a male issue in the early 11th century; the kingdom passed through his daughter's son to the House of Dunkeld or Canmore. The last Dunkeld king, Alexander III, died in 1286 and his infant granddaughter, Margaret, as heir; she died four years later. England, under Edward I, launched a series of conquests, resulting in the Wars of Scottish Independence, as Scotland frequently passed between the House of Balliol and the House of Bruce through the late Middle Ages. Scotland's ultimate victory confirmed Scotland as a fully independent and sovereign kingdom.

In 1707, the Kingdom of Scotland united with the Kingdom of England to create the Kingdom of Great Britain under the terms of the Treaty of Union. The Parliament of Scotland was subsumed into the Parliament of Great Britain in London with 45 Members of Parliament (MPs) representing Scottish affairs in the newly created parliament. During the Scottish Enlightenment and Industrial Revolution, Scotland became one of the commercial, intellectual and industrial powerhouses of Europe. Later, its industrial decline following the Second World War was particularly acute. In 1999, a Scottish Parliament was reconvened and a Scottish Government re–established under the Scotland Act 1998. In 2014, a referendum on Scotland regaining its independence from the United Kingdom was held, in which 55% of the electorate voted to remain a country of the United Kingdom.

== Pre-history ==
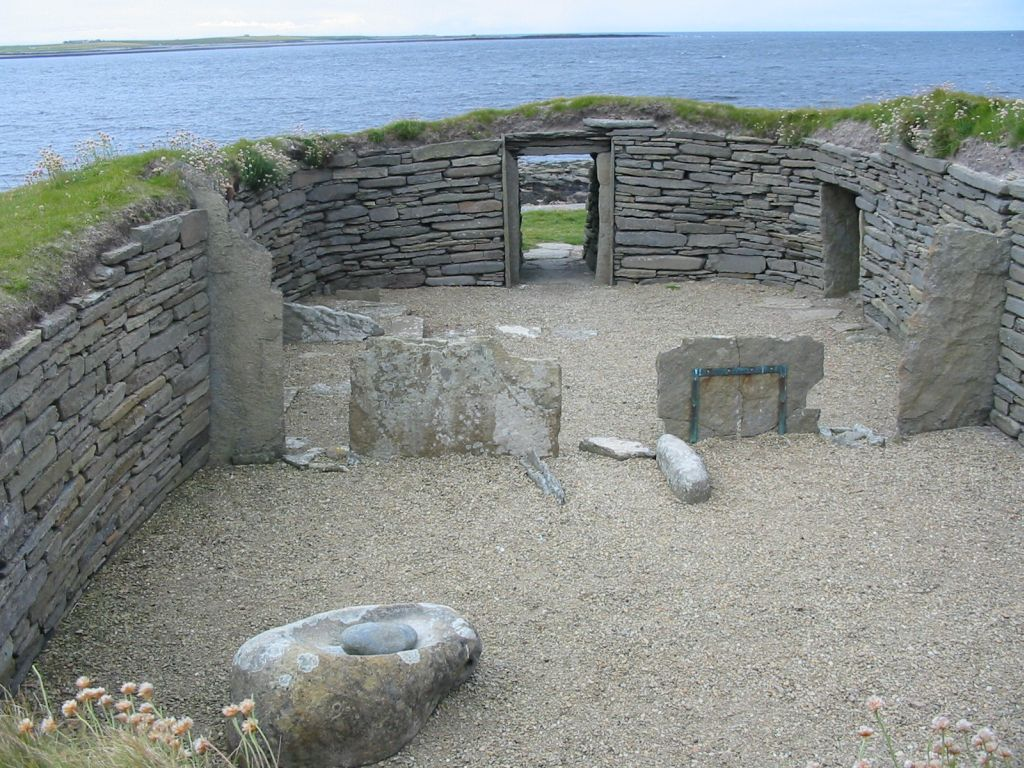
The oldest standing house in Northern Europe is at Knap of Howar, dating from 3500 BC.

Although there have been claims of Lower Paleolithic finds in Scotland, none stand up to close scrutiny. The earliest known human presence in Scotland are those of Upper Paleolithic hunter gathers, dating to the Bølling–Allerød Interstadial warm period at the end of the last ice age, around 14,670 to c. 12,900 years Before Present shortly following the retreat of the ice sheet that had previously covered Scotland. The earliest known site of human presence is the Howburn Farm encampment near Biggar, South Lanarkshire, which is dated to around 14,500 to 14,000 years ago, and is associated with the reindeer hunting Hamburgian culture. Several other waves of late Upper Paleolithic peoples are known to have inhabited Scotland, including the Federmesser and Ahrensburgian cultures. Other sites found around Scotland build up a picture of highly mobile boat-using people making tools from bone, stone and antlers. The oldest house for which there is evidence in Britain is the oval structure of wooden posts found at South Queensferry near the Firth of Forth, dating from the Mesolithic period, about 8240 BC. The earliest stone structures are probably the three hearths found at Jura, dated to about 6000 BC.

Neolithic farming brought permanent settlements. Evidence of these includes the well-preserved stone house at Knap of Howar on Papa Westray, dating from around 3500 BC and the village of similar houses at Skara Brae on West Mainland, Orkney from about 500 years later. The settlers introduced chambered cairn tombs from around 3500 BC, as at Maeshowe, and from about 3000 BC the many standing stones and circles such as those at Stenness on the mainland of Orkney, which date from about 3100 BC, of four stones, the tallest of which is 16 feet (5 m) in height. These were part of a pattern that developed in many regions across Europe at about the same time.

The creation of cairns and Megalithic monuments continued into the Bronze Age, which began in Scotland about 2000 BC. As elsewhere in Europe, hill forts were first introduced in this period, including the occupation of Eildon Hill near Melrose in the Scottish Borders, from around 1000 BC, which accommodated several hundred houses on a fortified hilltop. From the Early and Middle Bronze Age there is evidence of cellular round houses of stone, as at Jarlshof and Sumburgh in Shetland. There is also evidence of the occupation of crannogs, roundhouses partially or entirely built on artificial islands, usually in lakes, rivers and estuarine waters.

In the early Iron Age, from the seventh century BC, cellular houses began to be replaced on the northern isles by simple Atlantic roundhouses, substantial circular buildings with a dry stone construction. From about 400 BC, more complex Atlantic roundhouses began to be built, as at Howe, Orkney and Crosskirk, Caithness. The most massive constructions that date from this era are the circular broch towers, probably dating from about 200 BC. This period also saw the first wheelhouses, a roundhouse with a characteristic outer wall, within which was a circle of stone piers (bearing a resemblance to the spokes of a wheel), but these would flourish most in the era of Roman occupation. There is evidence for about 1,000 Iron Age hill forts in Scotland, most located below the Clyde-Forth line, which have suggested to some archaeologists the emergence of a society of petty rulers and warrior elites recognisable from Roman accounts.

== Roman invasion ==
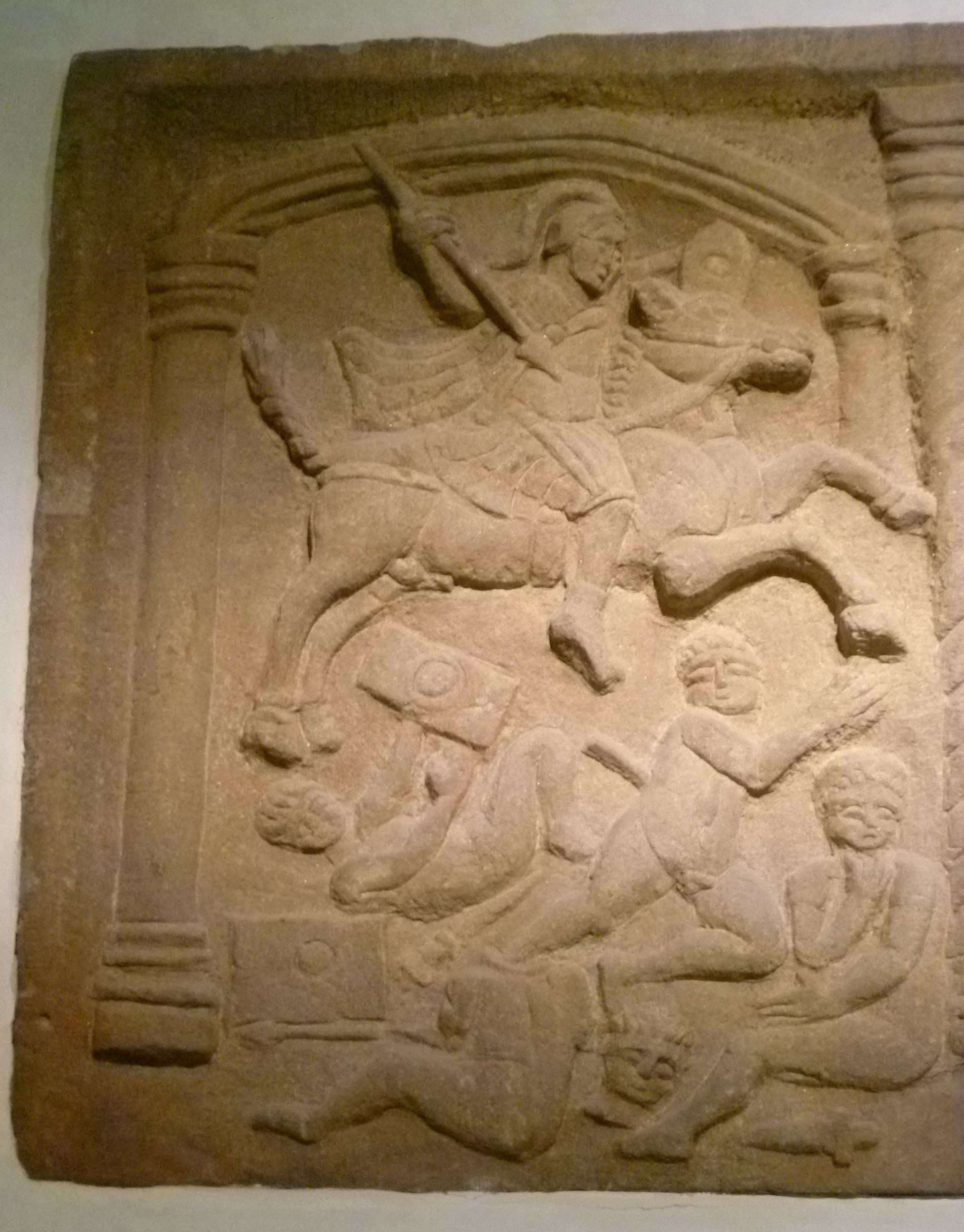
Roman cavalryman trampling conquered Picts, on a tablet found at Bo'ness dated to c. 142 and now in the National Museum of Scotland

Of the surviving pre-Roman accounts of Scotland, the first written reference to Scotland was the Greek Pytheas of Massalia, who may have circumnavigated the British Isles of Albion (Britain) and Ierne (Ireland) (Note: Ancient Greek: "... ἐν τούτῳ γε μὴν νῆσοι μέγιστοι τυνχάνουσιν οὖσαι δύο, Βρεττανικαὶ λεγόμεναι, Ἀλβίων καὶ Ἰέρνη...", ... en toútōi ge mēn nēsoi mégistoi tynkhánousin ousai dýo, Brettanikaì legómenai, Albíōn kaì Iérnē..., "... there are two very large islands in it, called the British Isles, Albion and Ierne...") sometime around 325 BC. The most northerly point of Britain was called Orcas (Orkney). By the time of Pliny the Elder, who died in AD 79, Roman knowledge of the geography of Scotland had extended to the Hebudes (The Hebrides), Dumna (probably the Outer Hebrides), the Caledonian Forest and the people of the Caledonii, from whom the Romans named the region north of their control Caledonia. Ptolemy, possibly drawing on earlier sources of information as well as more contemporary accounts from the Agricolan invasion, identified 18 tribes in Scotland in his Geography, but many of the names are obscure and the geography becomes less reliable in the north and west, suggesting early Roman knowledge of these areas was confined to observations from the sea.

The Roman invasion of Britain began in earnest in AD 43, leading to the establishment of the Roman province of Britannia in the south. By the year 71, the Roman governor Quintus Petillius Cerialis had launched an invasion of what is now Scotland. In the year 78, Gnaeus Julius Agricola arrived in Britain to take up his appointment as the new governor and began a series of major incursions. He is said to have pushed his armies to the estuary of the "River Taus" (usually assumed to be the River Tay) and established forts there, including a legionary fortress at Inchtuthil. After his victory over the northern tribes at Mons Graupius in 84, a series of forts and towers were established along the Gask Ridge, which marked the boundary between the Lowland and Highland zones, probably forming the first Roman limes or frontier in Scotland. Agricola's successors were unable or unwilling to further subdue the far north. By the year 87, the occupation was limited to the Southern Uplands and by the end of the first century the northern limit of Roman expansion was a line drawn between the Tyne and Solway Firth. The Romans eventually withdrew to a line in what is now northern England, building the fortification known as Hadrian's Wall from coast to coast.

Around 141, the Romans undertook a reoccupation of southern Scotland, moving up to construct a new limes between the Firth of Forth and the Firth of Clyde, which became the Antonine Wall. The largest Roman construction inside Scotland, it is a sward-covered wall made of turf around 20 feet (6 m) high, with nineteen forts. It extended for 37 miles (60 km). Having taken twelve years to build, the wall was overrun and abandoned soon after 160. The Romans retreated to the line of Hadrian's Wall. Roman troops penetrated far into the north of modern Scotland several more times, with at least four major campaigns. The most notable invasion was in 209 when the emperor Septimius Severus led a major force north. After the death of Severus in 210 they withdrew south to Hadrian's Wall, which would be Roman frontier until it collapsed in the 5th century.

The Great Conspiracy constituted a seemingly coordinated invasion against Roman rule in Britain in the later 4th century, which included the participation of the Gaelic Scoti and the Caledonians, who were then known as Picts by the Romans. This was defeated by the comes Theodosius, however, Roman military government was withdrawn from the island altogether by the early 5th century, resulting in the Anglo-Saxon settlement of Britain and the immigration of the Saxons to southeastern Scotland and the rest of eastern Great Britain.

By the close of the Roman occupation of southern and central Britain in the 5th century, the Picts had emerged as the dominant force in northern Scotland, with the various Brythonic tribes the Romans had first encountered there occupying the southern half of the country. Roman influence on Scottish culture and history was not enduring.

== Post-Roman Scotland ==
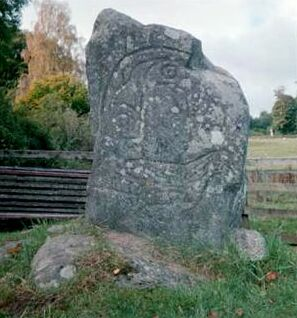
Clach an Tiompain, a Pictish symbol stone in Strathpeffer

In the centuries after the departure of the Romans from Britain, there were four groups within the borders of what is now Scotland. In the east were the Picts, with kingdoms between the river Forth and Shetland. In the late 6th century the dominant force was the Kingdom of Fortriu, whose lands were centred on Strathearn and Menteith and who raided along the eastern coast into modern England. In the west were the Gaelic (Goidelic)-speaking people of Dál Riata with their royal fortress at Dunadd in Argyll, with close links with the island of Ireland, from whom comes the name Scots. In the south was the British (Brythonic) Kingdom of Strathclyde, descendants of the peoples of the Roman-influenced kingdoms of "Hen Ogledd" (Old north), often named Alt Clut, the Brythonic name for their capital at Dumbarton Rock. Finally, there were the English or "Angles", Germanic invaders who had overrun much of southern Britain and held the Kingdom of Bernicia, in the south-east. The first English king in the historical record is Ida, who is said to have obtained the throne and the kingdom about 547. Ida's grandson, Æthelfrith, united his kingdom with Deira to the south to form Northumbria around the year 604. There were changes of dynasty, and the kingdom was divided, but it was re-united under Æthelfrith's son Oswald (r. 634–642).

Scotland was largely converted to Christianity by Irish-Scots missions associated with figures such as St Columba, from the fifth to the seventh centuries. These missions tended to found monastic institutions and collegiate churches that served large areas. Partly as a result of these factors, some scholars have identified a distinctive form of Celtic Christianity, in which abbots were more significant than bishops, attitudes to clerical celibacy were more relaxed and there were some significant differences in practice with Roman Christianity, particularly the form of tonsure and the method of calculating Easter, although most of these issues had been resolved by the mid-7th century.

== Rise of the Kingdom of Alba ==
Conversion to Christianity may have sped a long-term process of gaelicisation of the Pictish kingdoms, which adopted Gaelic language and customs. There was also a merger of the Gaelic and Pictish crowns, although historians debate whether it was a Pictish takeover of Dál Riata, or the other way around. This culminated in the rise of Cínaed mac Ailpín (Kenneth MacAlpin) in the 840s, which brought to power the House of Alpin. In 867 AD the Vikings seized the southern half of Northumbria, forming the Kingdom of York; three years later they stormed the Britons' fortress of Dumbarton and subsequently conquered much of England except for a reduced Kingdom of Wessex, leaving the new combined Pictish and Gaelic kingdom almost encircled. When he died as king of the combined kingdom in 900, Domnall II (Donald II) was the first man to be called rí Alban (i.e. King of Alba). The term Scotia was increasingly used to describe the kingdom between North of the Forth and Clyde and eventually the entire area controlled by its kings was referred to as Scotland.

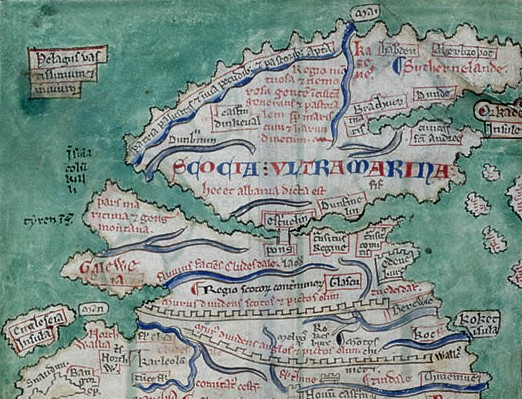
Scotland from the Matthew Paris map, c. 1250, showing Hadrian's Wall and above it the Antonine Wall, both depicted battlemented

The long reign (900–942/3) of Causantín (Constantine II) is often regarded as the key to formation of the Kingdom of Alba. He was later credited with bringing Scottish Christianity into conformity with the Catholic Church. After fighting many battles, his defeat at Brunanburh was followed by his retirement as a Culdee monk at St. Andrews. The period between the accession of his successor Máel Coluim I (Malcolm I) and Máel Coluim mac Cináeda (Malcolm II) was marked by good relations with the Wessex rulers of England, intense internal dynastic disunity and relatively successful expansionary policies. In 945, Máel Coluim I annexed Strathclyde as part of a deal with King Edmund of England, where the kings of Alba had probably exercised some authority since the later 9th century, an event offset somewhat by loss of control in Moray. The reign of King Donnchad I (Duncan I) from 1034 was marred by failed military adventures, and he was defeated and killed by MacBeth, the mormaer of Moray, who became king in 1040. MacBeth ruled for seventeen years before he was overthrown by Máel Coluim, the son of Donnchad, who some months later defeated MacBeth's step-son and successor Lulach to become King Máel Coluim III (Malcolm III).

It was Máel Coluim III, who acquired the nickname "Canmore" (Cenn Mór, "Great Chief"), which he passed to his successors and who did most to create the Dunkeld dynasty that ruled Scotland for the following two centuries. Particularly important was his second marriage to the Anglo-Hungarian princess Margaret. This marriage, and raids on northern England, prompted William the Conqueror to invade and Máel Coluim submitted to his authority, opening up Scotland to later claims of sovereignty by English kings. When Malcolm died in 1093, his brother Domnall III (Donald III) succeeded him. However, William II of England backed Máel Coluim's son by his first marriage, Donnchad, as a pretender to the throne and he seized power. His murder within a few months saw Domnall restored with one of Máel Coluim sons by his second marriage, Edmund, as his heir. The two ruled Scotland until two of Edmund's younger brothers returned from exile in England, again with English military backing. Victorious, Edgar, the oldest of the three, became king in 1097. Shortly afterwards Edgar and the King of Norway, Magnus Barefoot concluded a treaty recognising Norwegian authority over the Western Isles. In practice Norse control of the Isles was loose, with local chiefs enjoying a high degree of independence. He was succeeded by his brother Alexander, who reigned 1107–1124.

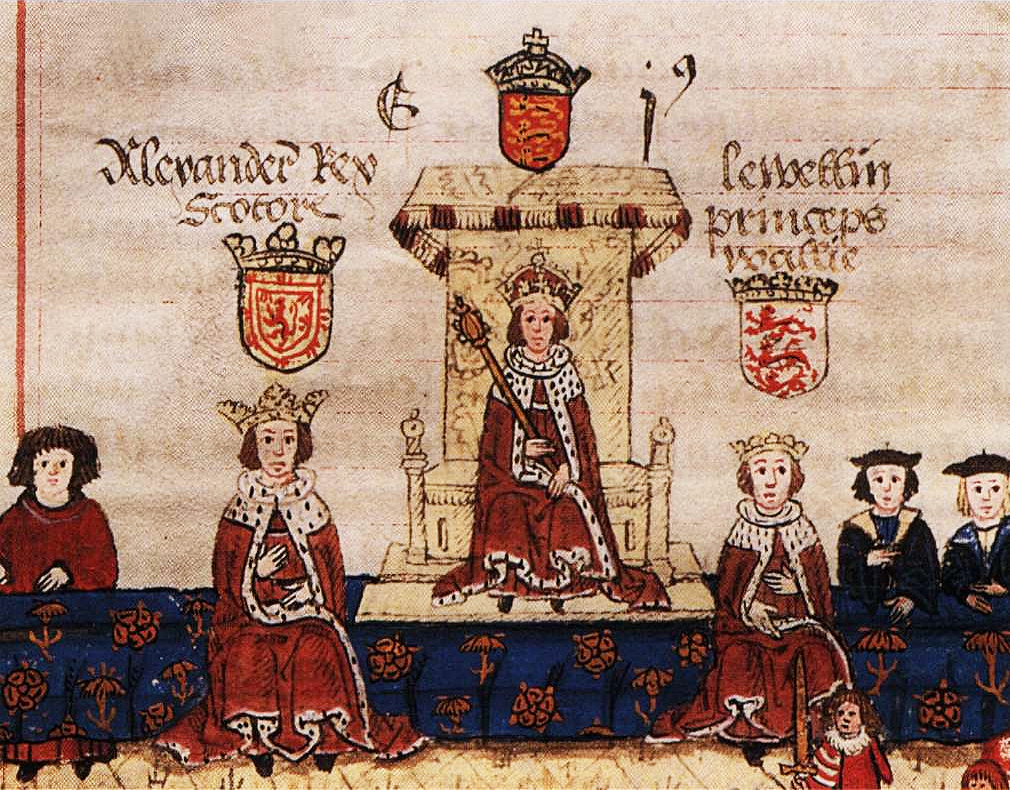
King Alexander III of Scotland on the left with Llywelyn, Prince of Wales on the right as guests to King Edward I of England at the sitting of an English parliament.

When Alexander died in 1124, the crown passed to Margaret's fourth son David I, who had spent part of his life in England where he held a barony. His reign saw what has been characterised as a "Davidian Revolution", by which Anglo-Norman followers of King David were granted lands and titles and intermixed their institutions with those of Scots intermarrying with the existing aristocracy, underpinning the development of later Medieval Scotland. David's Anglo-Norman followers joined the Scottish aristocracy and he introduced a system of feudal land tenure, which produced knight service, castles and an available body of heavily armed cavalry. He created a style of court closer to that of the rest of Western Europe, introduced the office of justicar to oversee justice, and local offices of sheriffs to administer localities. He established the first royal burghs in Scotland, granting rights to particular villages and towns, which led to the development of the first true Scottish cities and helped facilitate economic development as did the introduction of the first recorded Scottish coinage. He continued a process begun by his mother and brothers helping to establish foundations that brought reform to Scottish monasticism based on those at Cluny and he played a part in organising diocese on lines closer to those in the rest of Western Europe.

These reforms were pursued under his successors and grandchildren Malcolm IV of Scotland and William I, with the crown now passing down the main line of descent through primogeniture, leading to the first of a series of minorities. The benefits of greater authority were reaped by William's son Alexander II and his son Alexander III, who pursued a policy of peace with England to expand their authority in the Highlands and Islands. By the reign of Alexander III, the Scots were in a position to annexe the remainder of the western seaboard, which they did following Haakon Haakonarson's ill-fated invasion and the stalemate of the Battle of Largs with the Treaty of Perth in 1266.

== Wars of independence ==
The death of King Alexander III in 1286, and the death of his granddaughter and heir, Margaret, Maid of Norway, in 1290, left 14 rivals for succession. To prevent civil war the Scottish magnates asked Edward I of England to arbitrate, for which he extracted legal recognition that the realm of Scotland was held as a feudal dependency to the throne of England before choosing John Balliol, the man with the strongest claim, who became king in 1292. Robert Bruce, 5th Lord of Annandale, the next strongest claimant, accepted this outcome with reluctance. Over the next few years Edward I used the concessions he had gained to systematically undermine both the authority of King John and the independence of Scotland. In 1295, John, on the urgings of his chief councillors, entered into an alliance with France, known as the Auld Alliance.

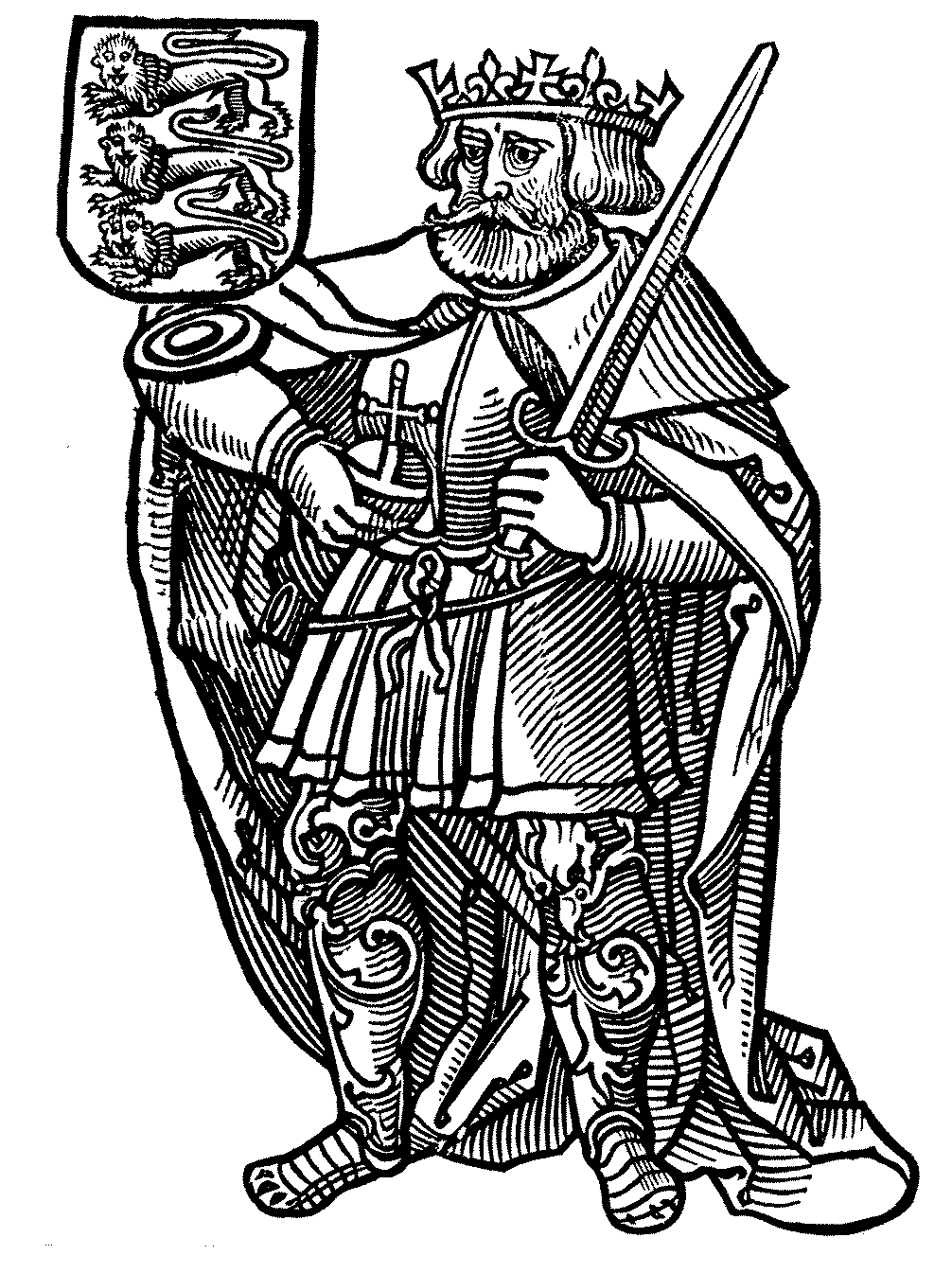
Edward I of England, 'Hammer of the Scots', depicted on a late-15thC woodcut.

In 1296, Edward invaded Scotland, deposing King John. The following year William Wallace and Andrew de Moray raised forces to resist the occupation and under their joint leadership an English army was defeated at the Battle of Stirling Bridge. For a short time Wallace ruled Scotland in the name of John Balliol as Guardian of the realm. Edward came north in person and defeated Wallace at the Battle of Falkirk in 1298. Wallace escaped but probably resigned as Guardian of Scotland. In 1305, he fell into the hands of the English, who executed him for treason despite the fact that he owed no allegiance to England.

Rivals John Comyn and Robert the Bruce, grandson of the claimant, were appointed as joint guardians in his place. On 10 February 1306, Bruce participated in the murder of Comyn, at Greyfriars Kirk in Dumfries. Less than seven weeks later, on 25 March, Bruce was crowned as King. However, Edward's forces overran the country after defeating Bruce's small army at the Battle of Methven. Despite the excommunication of Bruce and his followers by Pope Clement V, his support slowly strengthened; and by 1314 with the help of leading nobles such as Sir James Douglas and Thomas Randolph only the castles at Bothwell and Stirling remained under English control. Edward I had died in 1307. His heir Edward II moved an army north to break the siege of Stirling Castle and reassert control. Robert defeated that army at the Battle of Bannockburn in 1314, securing de facto independence. In 1320, the Declaration of Arbroath, a remonstrance to the Pope from the nobles of Scotland, helped convince Pope John XXII to overturn the earlier excommunication and nullify the various acts of submission by Scottish kings to English ones so that Scotland's sovereignty could be recognised by the major European dynasties. The Declaration has also been seen as one of the most important documents in the development of a Scottish national identity.

In 1326, what may have been the first full Parliament of Scotland met. The parliament had evolved from an earlier council of nobility and clergy, the colloquium, constituted around 1235, but perhaps in 1326 representatives of the burghs – the burgh commissioners – joined them to form the Three Estates. In 1328, Edward III signed the Treaty of Edinburgh–Northampton acknowledging Scottish independence under the rule of Robert the Bruce. However, four years after Robert's death in 1329, England once more invaded on the pretext of restoring Edward Balliol, son of John Balliol, to the Scottish throne, thus starting the Second War of Independence. Despite victories at Dupplin Moor and Halidon Hill, in the face of tough Scottish resistance led by Sir Andrew Murray, the son of Wallace's comrade in arms, successive attempts to secure Balliol on the throne failed. Edward III lost interest in the fate of his protégé after the outbreak of the Hundred Years' War with France. In 1341, David II, King Robert's son and heir, was able to return from temporary exile in France. Balliol finally resigned his claim to the throne to Edward in 1356, before retiring to Yorkshire, where he died in 1364.

== The Stuarts ==
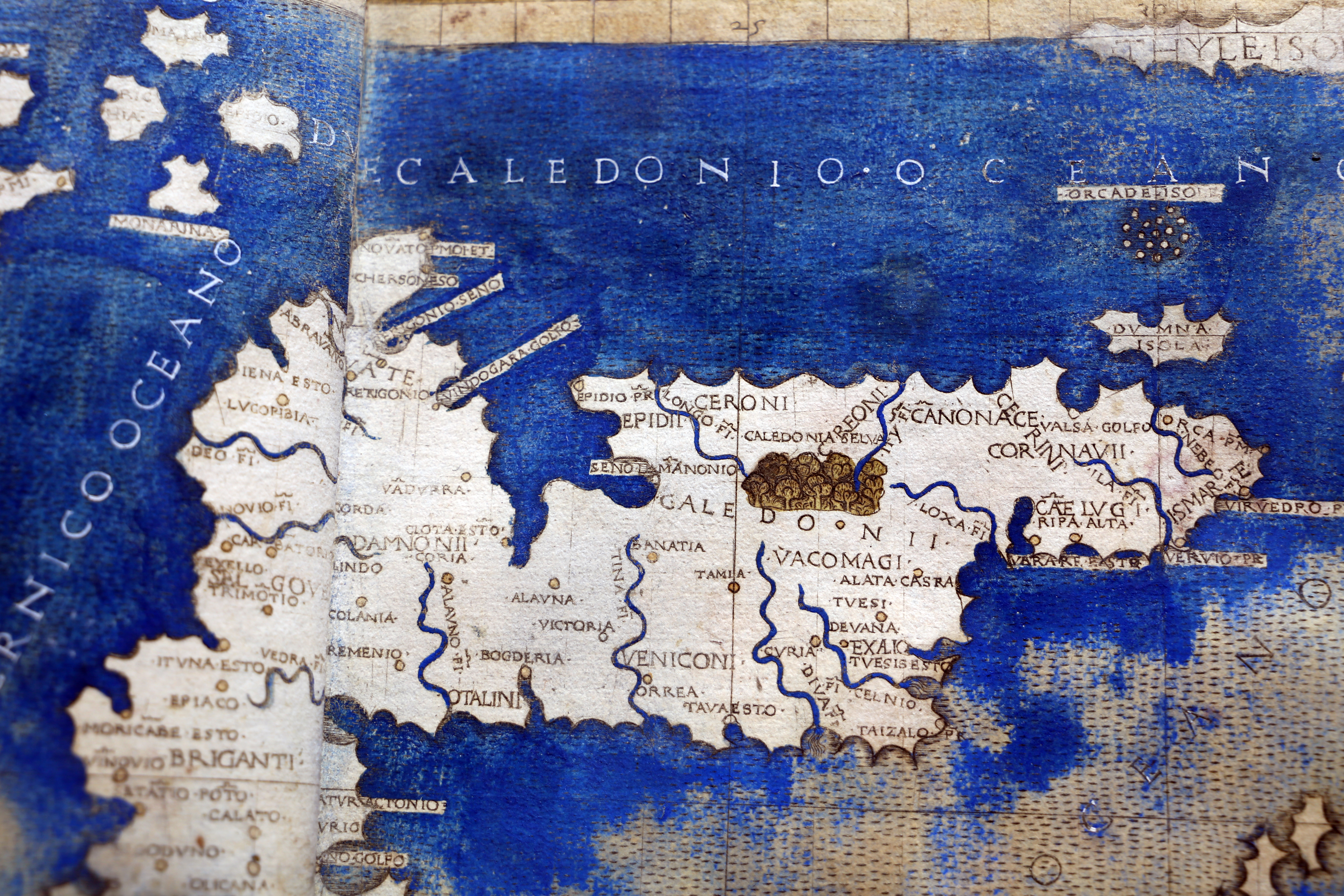
Highlands in 1482

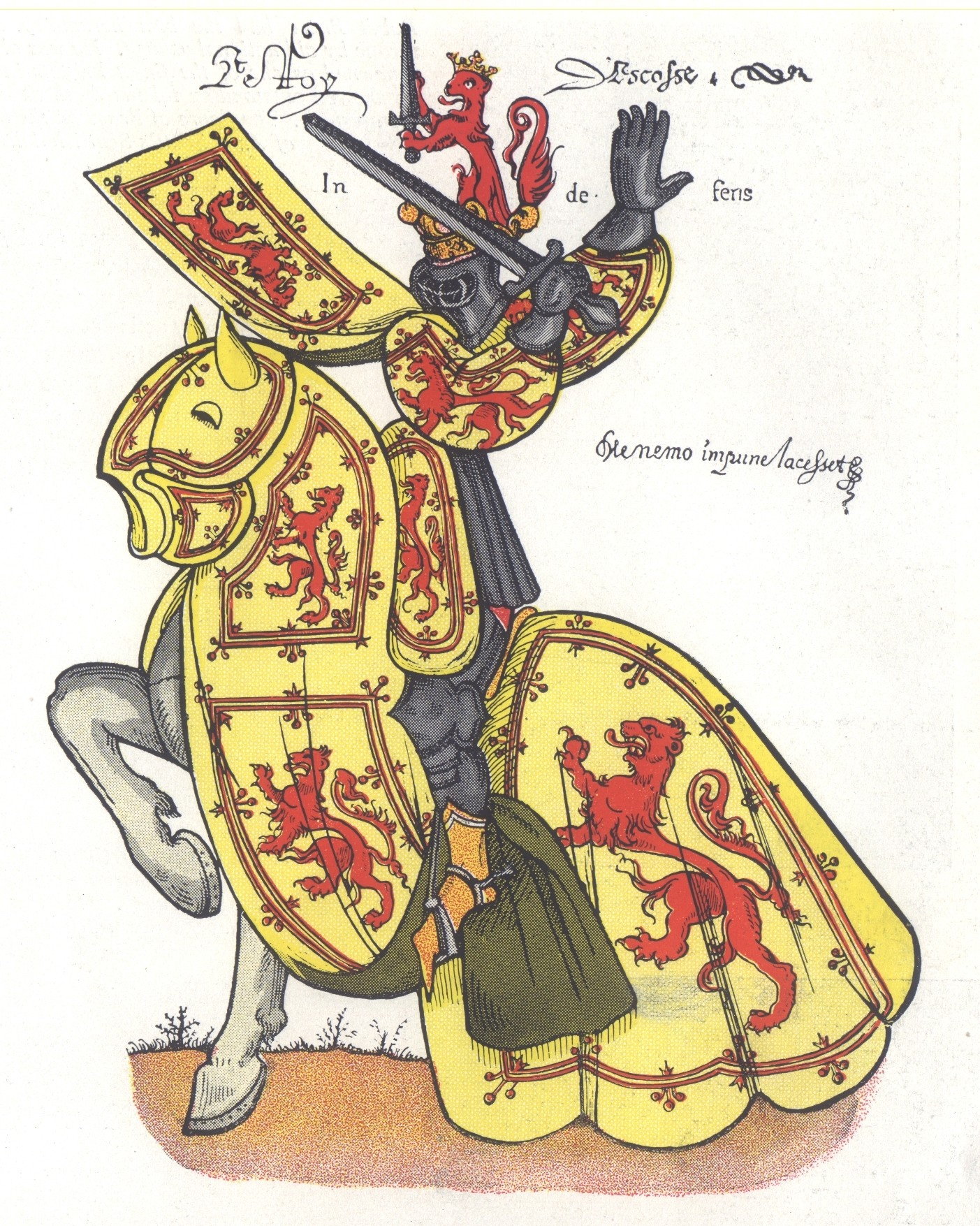
Heraldic depiction of the King of Scots from a 15th-century French armorial

After David II's death, Robert II, the first of the Stewart kings, came to the throne in 1371. He was followed in 1390 by his ailing son John, who took the regnal name Robert III. During Robert III's reign (1390–1406), actual power rested largely in the hands of his brother, Robert Stewart, Duke of Albany. After the suspicious death (possibly on the orders of the Duke of Albany) of his elder son, David, Duke of Rothesay in 1402, Robert, fearful for the safety of his younger son, the future James I, sent him to France in 1406. However, the English captured him en route and he spent the next 18 years as a prisoner held for ransom. As a result, after the death of Robert III, regents ruled Scotland: first, the Duke of Albany; and later his son Murdoch. When Scotland finally paid the ransom in 1424, James, aged 32, returned with his English bride determined to assert his authority. Several of the Albany family were executed; but he succeeded in centralising control in the hands of the crown, at the cost of increasing unpopularity, and was assassinated in 1437. His son James II (reigned 1437–1460), when he came of age in 1449, continued his father's policy of weakening the great noble families, most notably taking on the powerful Black Douglas family that had come to prominence at the time of the Bruce.

In 1468, the last significant acquisition of Scottish territory occurred when James III was engaged to Margaret of Denmark, receiving the Orkney Islands and the Shetland Islands in payment of her dowry. Berwick upon Tweed was captured by England in 1482. With the death of James III in 1488 at the Battle of Sauchieburn, his successor James IV successfully ended the quasi-independent rule of the Lord of the Isles, bringing the Western Isles under effective Royal control for the first time. In 1503, he married Margaret Tudor, daughter of Henry VII of England, thus laying the foundation for the 17th-century Union of the Crowns.

Scotland advanced markedly in educational terms during the 15th century with the founding of the University of St Andrews in 1413, the University of Glasgow in 1450 and the University of Aberdeen in 1495, and with the passing of the Education Act 1496, which decreed that all sons of barons and freeholders of substance should attend grammar schools. James IV's reign is often considered to have seen a flowering of Scottish culture under the influence of the European Renaissance.

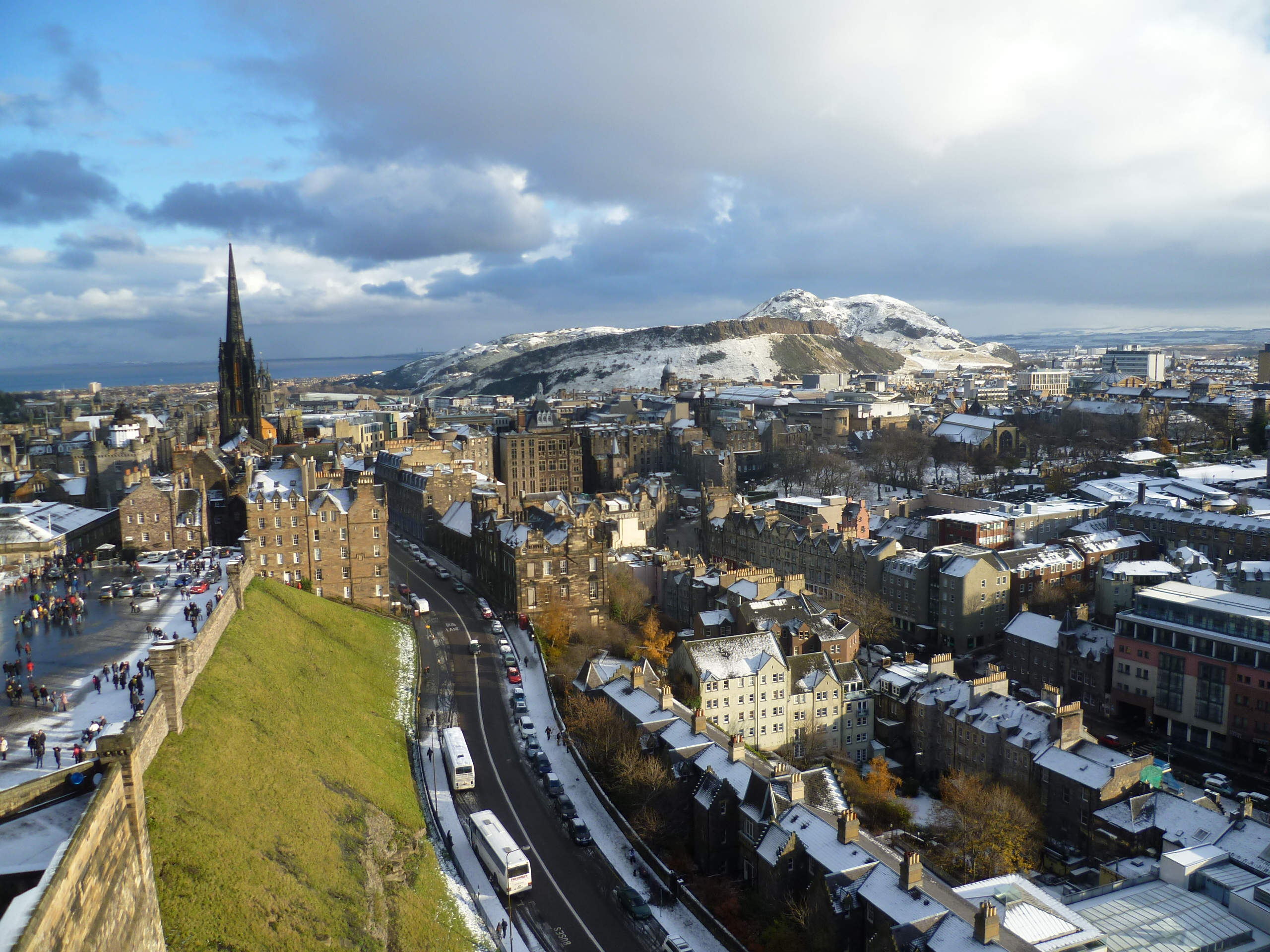
View from the royal apartments in Edinburgh Castle, used by the Stewart monarchs

In 1512, the Auld Alliance was renewed and under its terms, when the French were attacked by the English under Henry VIII, James IV invaded England in support. The invasion was stopped decisively at the Battle of Flodden Field during which the King, many of his nobles, and a large number of ordinary troops were killed, commemorated by the song Flowers of the Forest. Once again Scotland's government lay in the hands of regents in the name of the infant James V.

James V finally managed to escape from the custody of the regents in 1528. He continued his father's policy of subduing the rebellious Highlands, Western and Northern isles and the troublesome borders. He also continued the French alliance, marrying first the French noblewoman Madeleine of Valois and then after her death Marie of Guise. James V's domestic and foreign policy successes were overshadowed by another disastrous campaign against England that led to defeat at the Battle of Solway Moss (1542). James died a short time later, a demise blamed by contemporaries on "a broken heart". The day before his death, he was brought news of the birth of an heir: a daughter, who would become Mary, Queen of Scots.

Once again, Scotland was in the hands of a regent. Within two years, the Rough Wooing began, Henry VIII's military attempt to force a marriage between Mary and his son, Edward. This took the form of border skirmishing and several English campaigns into Scotland. In 1547, after the death of Henry VIII, forces under the English regent Edward Seymour, 1st Duke of Somerset were victorious at the Battle of Pinkie Cleugh, the climax of the Rough Wooing, and followed up by the occupation of Haddington. Mary was then sent to France at the age of five, as the intended bride of the heir to the French throne. Her mother, Marie de Guise, stayed in Scotland to look after the interests of Mary – and of France – although the Earl of Arran acted officially as regent. Guise responded by calling on French troops, who helped stiffen resistance to the English occupation. By 1550, after a change of regent in England, the English withdrew from Scotland completely.

From 1554 on, Marie de Guise took over the regency and continued to advance French interests in Scotland. French cultural influence resulted in a large influx of French vocabulary into Scots. But anti-French sentiment also grew, particularly among Protestants, who saw the English as their natural allies. This led to armed conflict at the siege of Leith. Marie de Guise died in June 1560, and soon after the Auld Alliance also ended, with the signing of the Treaty of Edinburgh, which provided for the removal of French and English troops from Scotland. The Scottish Reformation took place only days later when the Scottish Parliament abolished the Roman Catholic religion and outlawed the Mass.

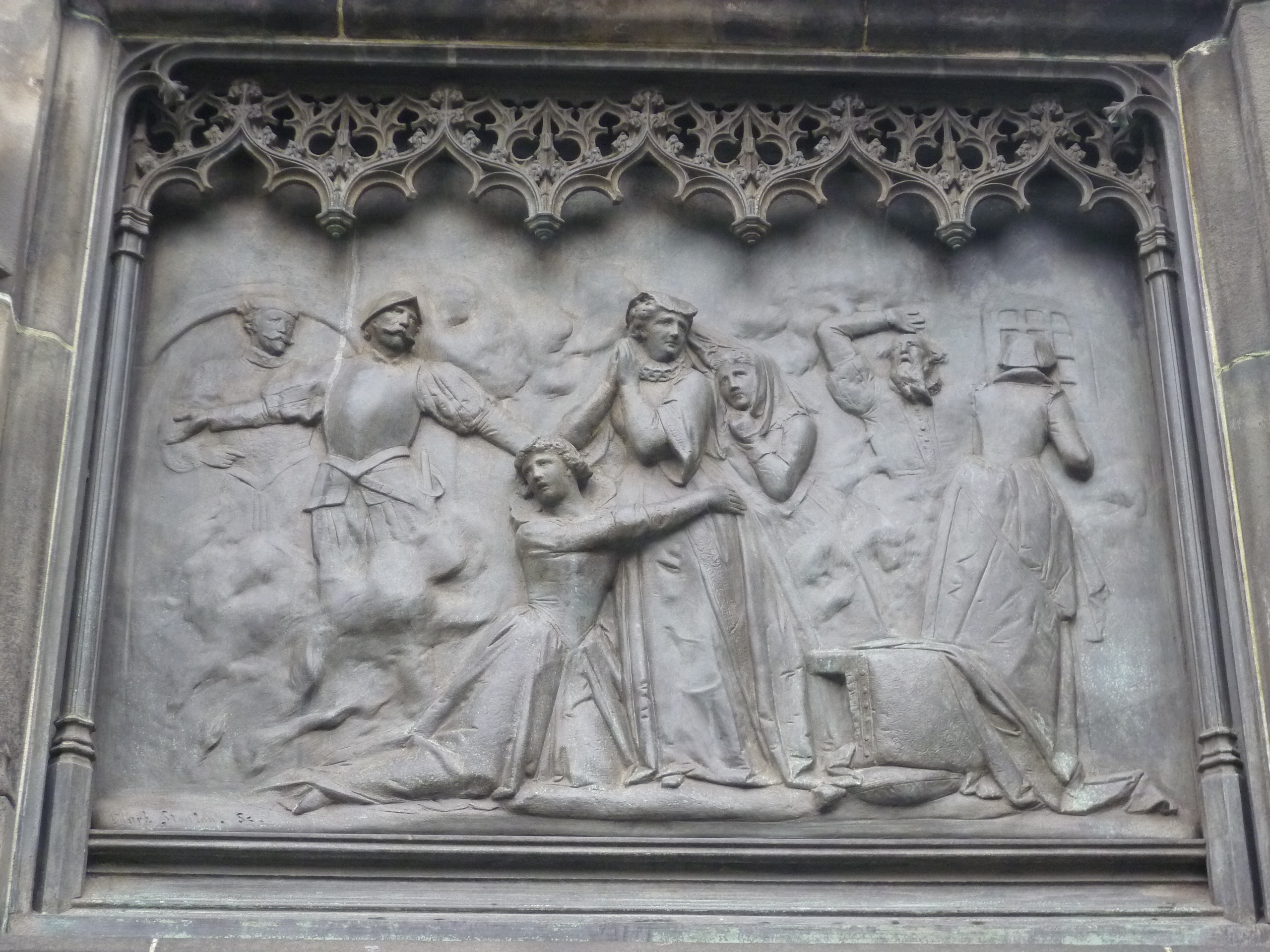
Depiction of David Rizzio's murder in 1566

Meanwhile, Queen Mary had been raised as a Catholic in France, and married to the Dauphin, who became king as Francis II in 1559, making her queen consort of France. When Francis died in 1560, Mary, now 19, returned to Scotland to take up the government. Despite her private religion, she did not attempt to re-impose Catholicism on her largely Protestant subjects, thus angering the chief Catholic nobles. Her six-year personal reign was marred by a series of crises, largely caused by the intrigues and rivalries of the leading nobles. The murder of her secretary, David Riccio, was followed by that of her unpopular second husband Lord Darnley, and her abduction by and marriage to the Earl of Bothwell, who was implicated in Darnley's murder. Mary and Bothwell confronted the lords at Carberry Hill and after their forces melted away, he fled and she was captured by Bothwell's rivals. Mary was imprisoned in Lochleven Castle, and in July 1567, was forced to abdicate in favour of her infant son James VI. Mary eventually escaped and attempted to regain the throne by force. After her defeat at the Battle of Langside in 1568, she took refuge in England, leaving her young son in the hands of regents. In Scotland the regents fought a civil war on behalf of James VI against his mother's supporters. In England, Mary became a focal point for Catholic conspirators and was eventually tried for treason and executed on the orders of her kinswoman Elizabeth I.

== Protestant Reformation ==
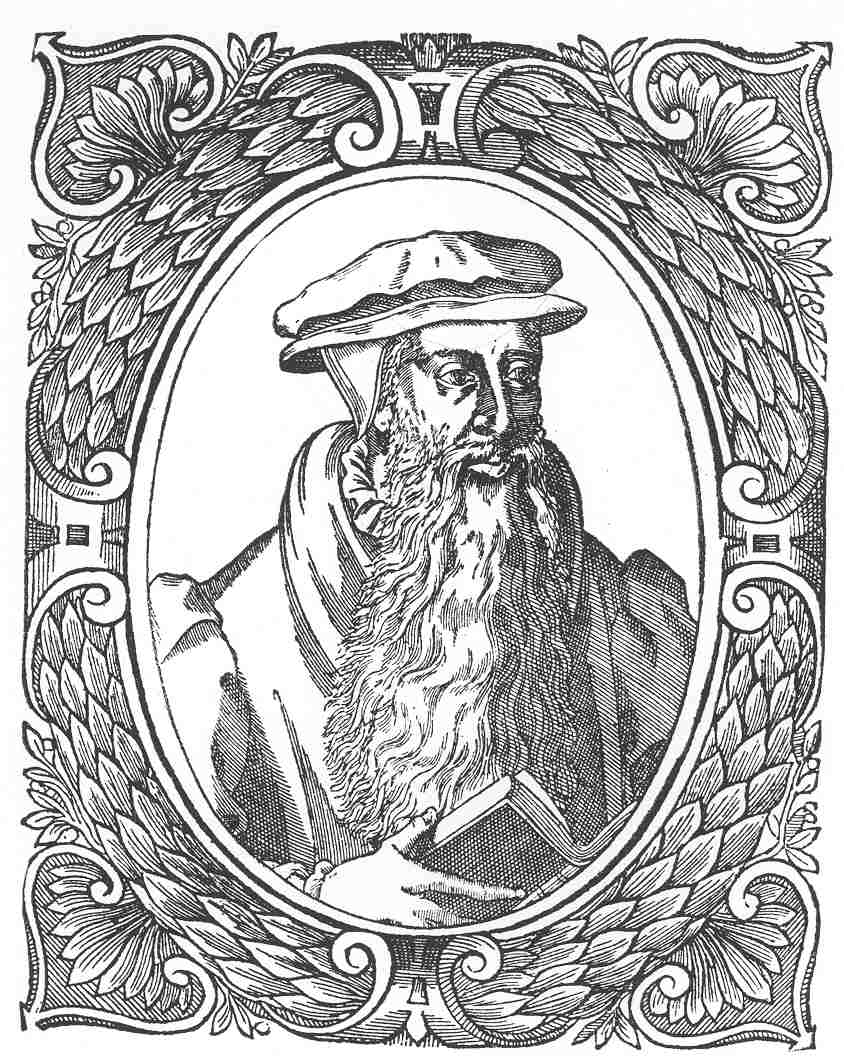
In 1559, John Knox returned from ministering in Geneva to lead the Calvinist reformation in Scotland.

During the 16th century, Scotland underwent a Protestant Reformation that created a predominantly Calvinist national Kirk, which became Presbyterian in outlook and severely reduced the powers of bishops. In the earlier part of the century, the teachings of first Martin Luther and then John Calvin began to influence Scotland, particularly through Scottish scholars, often training for the priesthood, who had visited Continental universities. The Lutheran preacher Patrick Hamilton was executed for heresy in St. Andrews in 1528. The execution of others, especially the Zwingli-influenced George Wishart, who was burnt at the stake on the orders of Cardinal Beaton in 1546, angered Protestants. Wishart's supporters assassinated Beaton soon after and seized St. Andrews Castle, which they held for a year before they were defeated with the help of French forces. The survivors, including chaplain John Knox, were condemned to be galley slaves in France, stoking resentment of the French and creating martyrs for the Protestant cause.

Limited toleration and the influence of exiled Scots and Protestants in other countries, led to the expansion of Protestantism, with a group of lairds declaring themselves Lords of the Congregation in 1557 and representing their interests politically. The collapse of the French alliance and English intervention in 1560 meant that a relatively small, but highly influential, group of Protestants were in a position to impose reform on the Scottish church. A confession of faith, rejecting papal jurisdiction and the mass, was adopted by Parliament in 1560, while the young Mary, Queen of Scots, was still in France.

Knox, having escaped the galleys and spent time in Geneva as a follower of Calvin, emerged as the most significant figure of the period. The Calvinism of the reformers led by Knox resulted in a settlement that adopted a Presbyterian system and rejected most of the elaborate trappings of the medieval church. The reformed Kirk gave considerable power to local lairds, who often had control over the appointment of the clergy. There were widespread, but generally orderly outbreaks of iconoclasm. At this point the majority of the population was probably still Catholic in persuasion and the Kirk found it difficult to penetrate the Highlands and Islands, but began a gradual process of conversion and consolidation that, compared with reformations elsewhere, was conducted with relatively little persecution.

Women shared in the religiosity of the day. The egalitarian and emotional aspects of Calvinism appealed to men and women alike. Historian Alasdair Raffe finds that, "Men and women were thought equally likely to be among the elect....Godly men valued the prayers and conversation of their female co-religionists, and this reciprocity made for loving marriages and close friendships between men and women." Furthermore, there was an increasingly intense relationship in the pious bonds between minister and his women parishioners. For the first time, laywomen gained numerous new religious roles and took a prominent place in prayer societies.

== 17th century ==
In 1603, James VI King of Scots inherited the throne of the Kingdom of England and became King James I of England, leaving Edinburgh for London and uniting England with Scotland under one monarch. The Union was a personal or dynastic union, with the Crowns remaining both distinct and separate—despite James's best efforts to create a new "imperial" throne of "Great Britain". The acquisition of the Irish crown along with the English facilitated a process of settlement by Scots in what was historically the most troublesome area of the kingdom in Ulster, with perhaps 50,000 Scots settling in the province by the mid-17th century. James adopted a different approach to impose his authority in the western Highlands and Islands. The additional military resource that was now available, particularly the English navy, resulted in the enactment of the Statutes of Iona which compelled integration of Hebridean clan leaders with the rest of Scottish society. Attempts to found a Scottish colony in North America in Nova Scotia were largely unsuccessful without sufficient funds or willing colonists.

=== Wars of the Three Kingdoms and the Puritan Commonwealth ===
==== Bishops' Wars ====
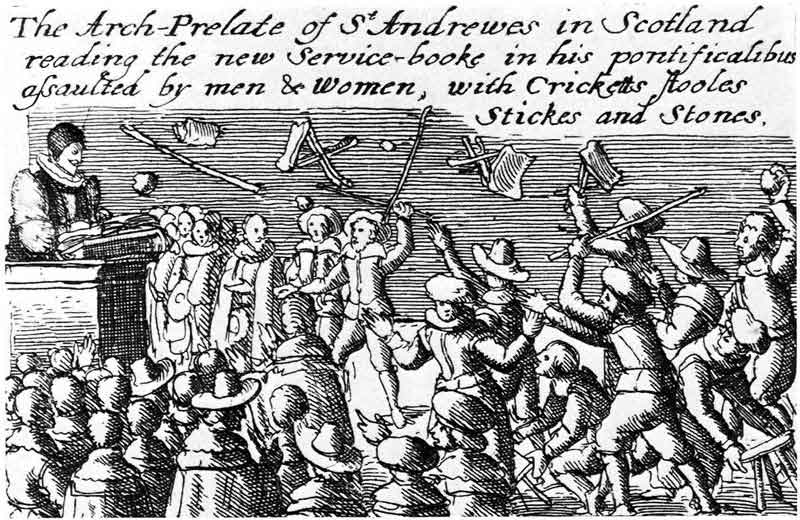
The St. Giles riot initiated by Jenny Geddes sparked off the Bishops' Wars.

Although James had tried to get the Scottish Church to accept some of the High Church Anglicanism of his southern kingdom, he met with limited success. His son and successor, Charles I, took matters further, introducing an English-style Prayer Book into the Scottish church in 1637. This resulted in anger and widespread rioting. (The story goes that it was initiated by a certain Jenny Geddes who threw a stool in St Giles Cathedral.) Representatives of various sections of Scottish society drew up the National Covenant in 1638, objecting to the King's liturgical innovations. In November of the same year matters were taken even further, when at a meeting of the General Assembly in Glasgow the Scottish bishops were formally expelled from the Church, which was then established on a full Presbyterian basis. Charles gathered a military force; but as neither side wished to push the matter to a full military conflict, a temporary settlement was concluded at Pacification of Berwick. Matters remained unresolved until 1640 when, in a renewal of hostilities, Charles's northern forces were defeated by the Scots at the Battle of Newburn to the west of Newcastle. During the course of these Bishops' Wars Charles tried to raise an army of Irish Catholics, but was forced to back down after a storm of protest in Scotland and England. The backlash from this venture provoked a rebellion in Ireland and Charles was forced to appeal to the English Parliament for funds. Parliament's demands for reform in England eventually resulted in the English Civil War. This series of civil wars that engulfed England, Ireland and Scotland in the 1640s and 1650s is known to modern historians as the Wars of the Three Kingdoms. The Covenanters meanwhile, were left governing Scotland, where they raised a large army of their own and tried to impose their religious settlement on Episcopalians and Roman Catholics in the north of the country. In England his religious policies caused similar resentment and he ruled without recourse to parliament from 1629.

==== Civil war ====
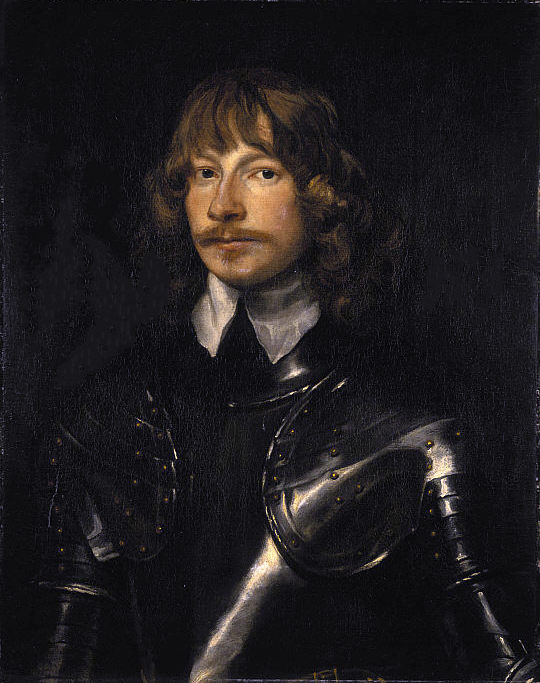
James Graham, 1st Marquess of Montrose, who led a successful pro-royalist campaign in the Highlands in 1644–1646

As the civil wars developed, the English Parliamentarians appealed to the Scots Covenanters for military aid against the King. A Solemn League and Covenant was entered into, guaranteeing the Scottish Church settlement and promising further reform in England. Scottish troops played a major part in the defeat of Charles I, notably at the battle of Marston Moor. An army under the Earl of Leven occupied the North of England for some time.

However, not all Scots supported the Covenanter's taking arms against their King. In 1644, James Graham, 1st Marquess of Montrose attempted to raise the Highlands for the King. Few Scots would follow him, but, aided by 1,000 Irish, Highland and Islesmen troops sent by the Irish Confederates under Alasdair MacDonald (MacColla), and an instinctive genius for mobile warfare, he was stunningly successful. A Scottish Civil War began in September 1644 with his victory at battle of Tippermuir. After a series of victories over poorly trained Covenanter militias, the lowlands were at his mercy. However, at this high point, his army was reduced in size, as MacColla and the Highlanders preferred to continue the war in the north against the Campbells. Shortly after, what was left of his force was defeated at the Battle of Philiphaugh. Escaping to the north, Montrose attempted to continue the struggle with fresh troops; but in July 1646 his army was disbanded after the King surrendered to the Scots army at Newark, and the civil war came to an end.

The following year Charles, while he was being held captive in Carisbrooke Castle, entered into an agreement with moderate Scots Presbyterians. In this secret "Engagement", the Scots promised military aid in return for the King's agreement to implement Presbyterianism in England on a three-year trial basis. The Duke of Hamilton led an invasion of England to free the King, but he was defeated by Oliver Cromwell in August 1648 at the Battle of Preston.

==== Cromwellian occupation and Restoration ====
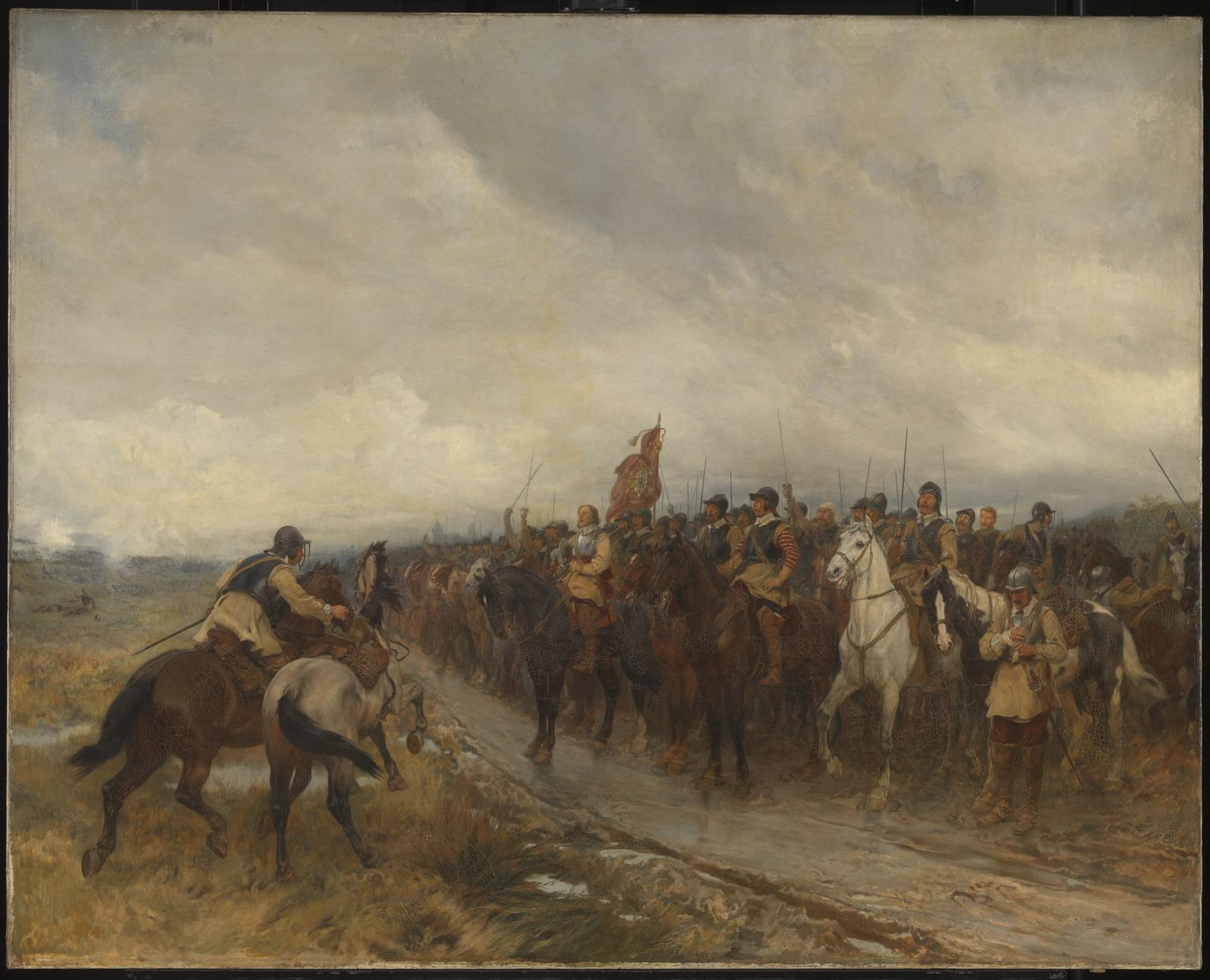
Cromwell at Dunbar by Andrew Carrick Gow. The battle of Dunbar was a crushing defeat for the Scottish Covenanters

The execution of Charles I in 1649 was carried out in the face of objections by the Covenanter government and his son was immediately proclaimed as King Charles II in Edinburgh. Oliver Cromwell led an invasion of Scotland in 1650, and defeated the Scottish army at Dunbar. One year later, a Scottish invasion of England was again defeated by Cromwell at Worcester. Cromwell emerged as the leading figure in the English government and Scotland was occupied by an English force under George Monck. The country was incorporated into the Puritan-governed Commonwealth and lost its independent church government, parliament and legal system, but gained access to English markets. Various attempts were made to legitimise the union, calling representatives from the Scottish burghs and shires to negotiations and to various English parliaments, where they were always under-represented and had little opportunity for dissent. However, final ratification was delayed by Cromwell's problems with his various parliaments and the union did not become the subject of an act until 1657 (see Tender of Union).

Following the death of Cromwell and the regime's collapse, Charles II was restored in 1660 and Scotland again became an independent kingdom. Scotland regained its system of law, parliament and kirk, but also the Lords of the Articles (by which the crown managed parliament), bishops and a king who did not visit the country. He ruled largely without reference to Parliament, through a series of commissioners. These began with John, Earl of Middleton and ended with the king's brother and heir, James, Duke of York (known in Scotland as the Duke of Albany). The English Navigation Acts prevented the Scots engaging in what would have been lucrative trading with England's colonies. The restoration of episcopacy was a source of trouble, particularly in the south-west of the country, an area with strong Presbyterian sympathies. Abandoning the official church, many of the inhabitants began to attend illegal field assemblies, known as conventicles. Official attempts to suppress these led to a rising in 1679, defeated by James, Duke of Monmouth, the King's illegitimate son, at the Battle of Bothwell Bridge. In the early 1680s a more intense phase of persecution began, later to be called "the Killing Time". When Charles died in 1685 and his brother, a Roman Catholic, succeeded him as James VII of Scotland (and II of England), matters came to a head.

=== The deposition of James VII ===
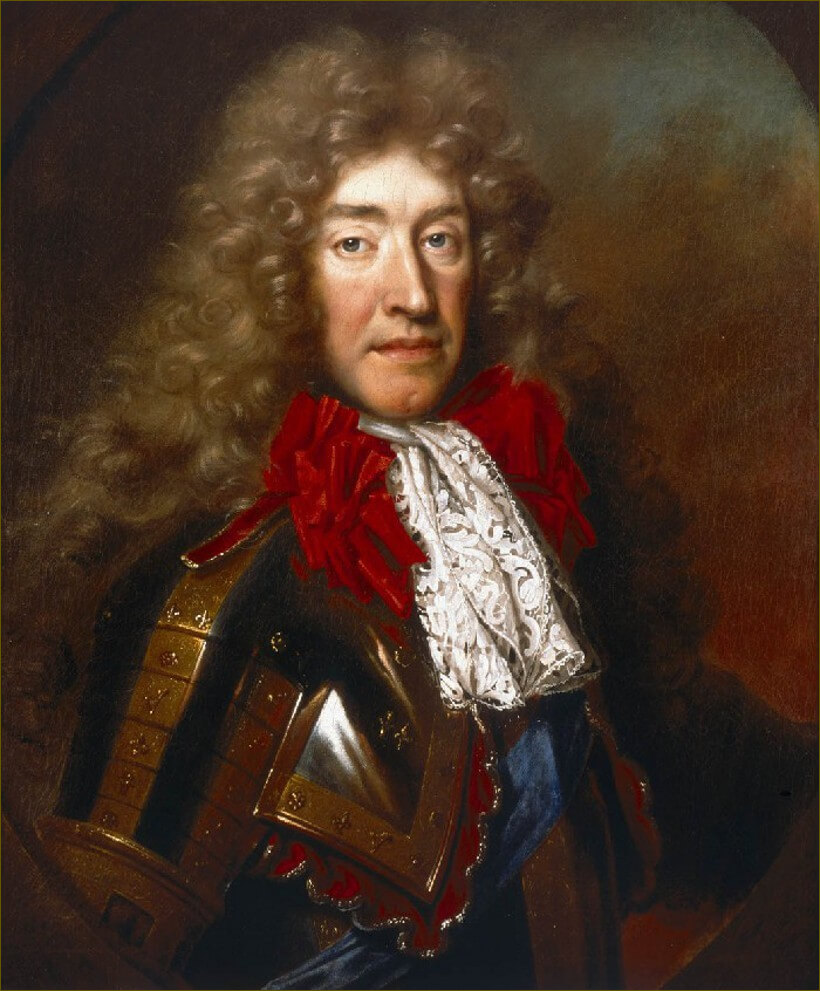
James VII of Scotland (and II of England), who vacated the throne in 1688

James put Catholics in key positions in the government and attendance at conventicles was made punishable by death. He disregarded parliament, purged the council and forced through religious toleration to Roman Catholics, alienating his Protestant subjects. It was believed that the king would be succeeded by his daughter Mary, a Protestant and the wife of William of Orange, Stadtholder of the Netherlands, but when in 1688, James produced a male heir, James Francis Edward Stuart, it was clear that his policies would outlive him. An invitation by seven leading Englishmen led William to land in England with 40,000 men, and James fled, leading to the almost bloodless "Glorious Revolution". The Estates issued a Claim of Right that suggested that James had forfeited the crown by his actions (in contrast to England, which relied on the legal fiction of an abdication) and offered it to William and Mary, which William accepted, along with limitations on royal power. The final settlement restored Presbyterianism and abolished the bishops who had generally supported James. However, William, who was more tolerant than the Kirk tended to be, passed acts restoring the Episcopalian clergy excluded after the Revolution.

Although William's supporters dominated the government, there remained a significant following for James, particularly in the Highlands. His cause, which became known as Jacobitism – from Jacobus, the Latin rendering of James – led to a series of risings. An initial Jacobite military attempt was led by John Graham, Viscount Dundee. His forces, almost all Highlanders, defeated William's forces at the Battle of Killiecrankie in 1689, but they took heavy losses and Dundee was slain in the fighting. Without his leadership the Jacobite army was soon defeated at the Battle of Dunkeld. In the aftermath of the Jacobite defeat on 13 February 1692, in an incident since known as the Massacre of Glencoe, 38 members of the Clan MacDonald of Glencoe were killed by members of the Earl of Argyll's Regiment of Foot, on the grounds that they had not been prompt in pledging allegiance to the new monarchs.

=== Economic crisis of the 1690s ===
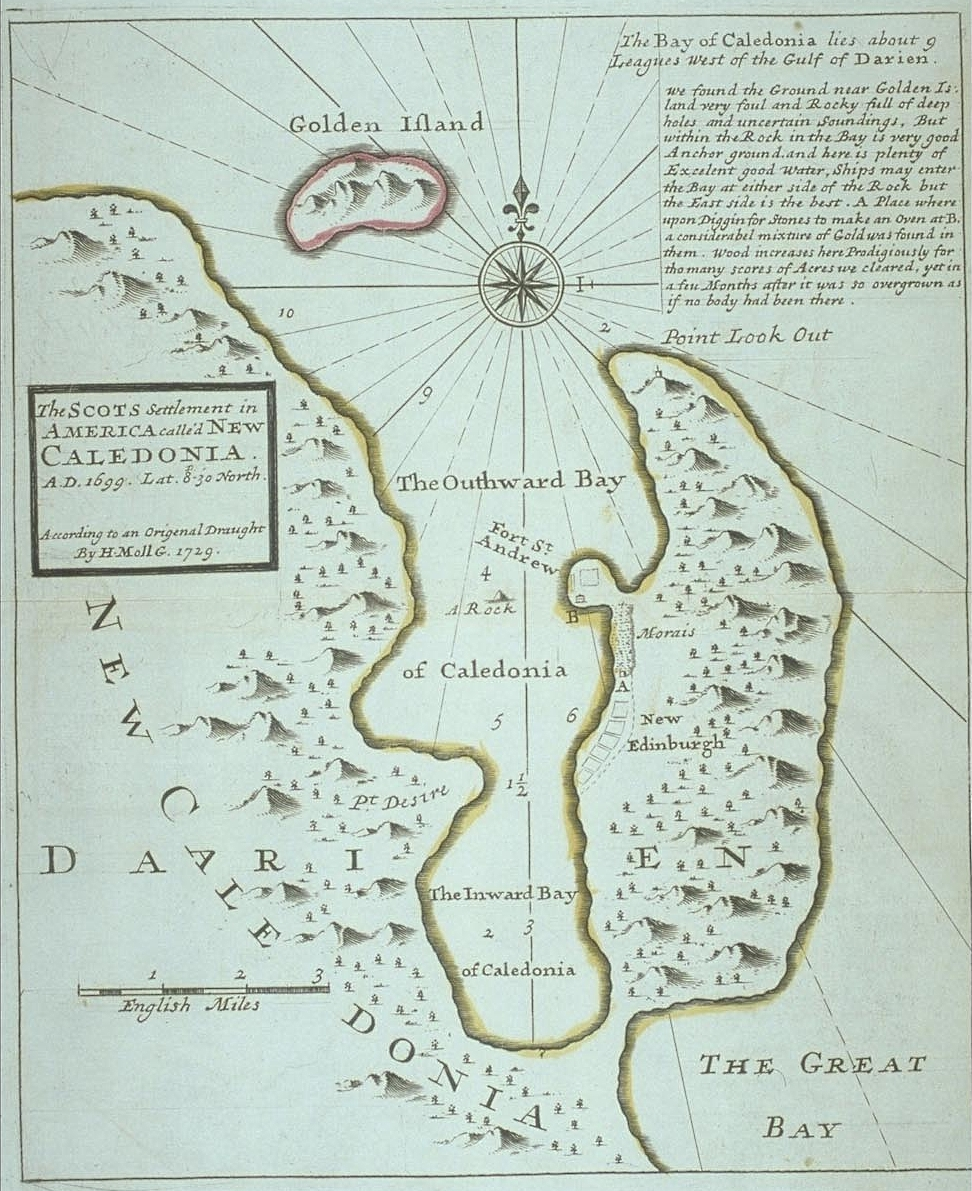
The colony of New Caledonia on the Isthmus of Darien

The closing decade of the 17th century saw the generally favourable economic conditions that had dominated since the Restoration come to an end. There was a slump in trade with the Baltic and France from 1689 to 1691, caused by French protectionism and changes in the Scottish cattle trade, followed by four years of failed harvests (1695, 1696 and 1698–1699), an era known as the "seven ill years". The result was severe famine and depopulation, particularly in the north. The Parliament of Scotland of 1695 enacted proposals to help the desperate economic situation, including setting up the Bank of Scotland. The "Company of Scotland Trading to Africa and the Indies" received a charter to raise capital through public subscription.

With the dream of building a lucrative overseas colony for Scotland, the Company of Scotland invested in the Darien scheme, an ambitious plan devised by William Paterson to establish a colony on the Isthmus of Panama in the hope of establishing trade with the Far East. The Darién scheme won widespread support in Scotland as the landed gentry and the merchant class were in agreement in seeing overseas trade and colonialism as routes to upgrade Scotland's economy.

Since the capital resources of the Edinburgh merchants and landholder elite were insufficient, the company appealed to middling social ranks, who responded with patriotic fervour to the call for money; the lower classes volunteered as colonists. But the English government opposed the idea: involved in the War of the Grand Alliance from 1689 to 1697 against France, it did not want to offend Spain, which claimed the territory as part of New Granada. The English investors withdrew. Returning to Edinburgh, the Company raised 400,000 pounds in a few weeks. Three small fleets with a total of 3,000 men eventually set out for Panama in 1698. The exercise proved a disaster. Poorly equipped; beset by incessant rain; under attack by the Spanish from nearby Cartagena; and refused aid by the English in the West Indies, the colonists abandoned their project in 1700. Only 1,000 survived and only one ship managed to return to Scotland.

== 18th century ==
Union flag, combining the Cross of St George of England, with the Cross of St. Andrew of Scotland.

Scotland was a poor rural, agricultural society with a population of 1.3 million in 1755. Although Scotland lost home rule, the Union allowed it to break free of a stultifying system and opened the way for the Scottish Enlightenment as well as a great expansion of trade and increase in opportunity and wealth. Edinburgh economist Adam Smith concluded in 1776 that "By the union with England, the middling and inferior ranks of people in Scotland gained a complete deliverance from the power of an aristocracy which had always before oppressed them." Historian Jonathan Israel holds that the Union "proved a decisive catalyst politically and economically," by allowing ambitious Scots entry on an equal basis to a rich expanding empire and its increasing trade.

Scotland's transformation into a rich leader of modern industry came suddenly and unexpectedly in the next 150 years, following its union with England in 1707 and its integration with the advanced English and imperial economies. The transformation was led by two cities that grew rapidly after 1770. Glasgow, on the river Clyde, was the base for the tobacco and sugar trade with an emerging textile industry. Edinburgh was the administrative and intellectual centre where the Scottish Enlightenment was chiefly based.

=== Union with England ===
By the start of the 18th century, a political union between Scotland and England became politically and economically attractive, promising to open up the much larger markets of England, as well as those of the growing English Empire. With economic stagnation since the late 17th century, which was particularly acute in 1704, the country depended more and more heavily on sales of cattle and linen to England, who used this to create pressure for a union. The Scottish parliament voted on 6 January 1707, by 110 to 69, to adopt the Treaty of Union. It was also a full economic union; indeed, most of its 25 articles dealt with economic arrangements for the new state known as "Great Britain". It added 45 Scots to the 513 members of the House of Commons and 16 Scots to the 190 members of the House of Lords, and ended the Scottish parliament. It also replaced the Scottish systems of currency, taxation and laws regulating trade with laws made in London. Scottish law remained separate from English law, and the religious system was not changed. England had about five times the population of Scotland at the time, and about 36 times as much wealth.

=== Jacobitism ===
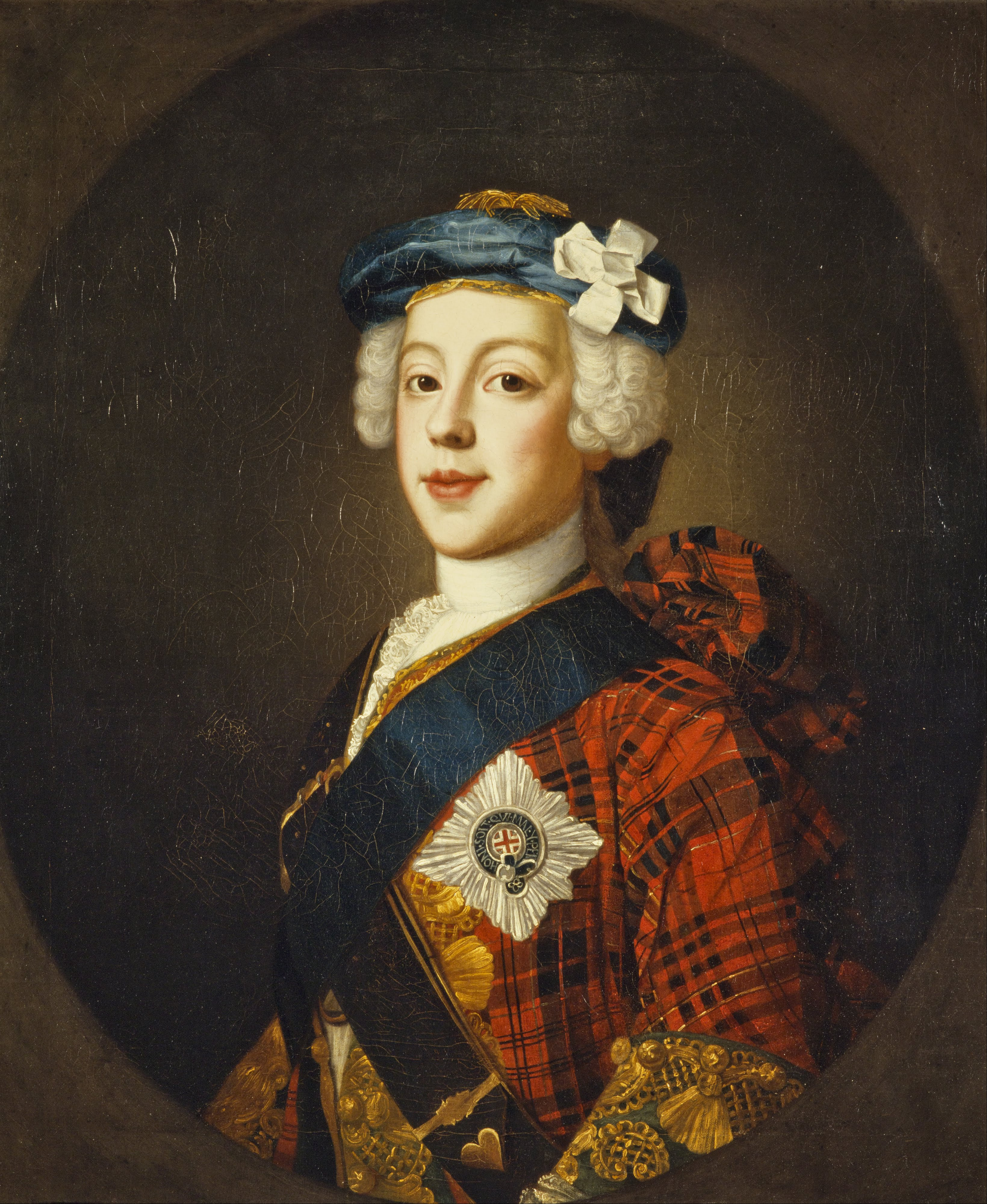
Charles Edward Stuart, known as The Young Pretender and Bonnie Prince Charlie, who led the '45 rising

Jacobitism was revived by the unpopularity of the union. In 1708, James Francis Edward Stuart, the son of James VII, who became known as "The Old Pretender", attempted an invasion with a French fleet carrying 6,000 men, but the Royal Navy prevented it from landing troops. A more serious attempt occurred in 1715, soon after the death of Anne and the accession of the first Hanoverian king, the eldest son of Sophie, as George I of Great Britain. This rising (known as The 'Fifteen) envisaged simultaneous uprisings in Wales, Devon, and Scotland. However, government arrests forestalled the southern ventures. In Scotland, John Erskine, Earl of Mar, nicknamed Bobbin' John, raised the Jacobite clans but proved to be an indecisive leader and an incompetent soldier.

Mar captured Perth, but let a smaller government force under the Duke of Argyll hold the Stirling plain. Part of Mar's army joined up with risings in northern England and southern Scotland, and the Jacobites fought their way into England before being defeated at the Battle of Preston, surrendering on 14 November 1715. The day before, Mar had failed to defeat Argyll at the Battle of Sheriffmuir. At this point, James belatedly landed in Scotland, but was advised that the cause was hopeless. He fled back to France. An attempted Jacobite invasion with Spanish assistance in 1719 met with little support from the clans and ended in defeat at the Battle of Glen Shiel.

In 1745, the Jacobite rising known as The 'Forty-Five began. Charles Edward Stuart, son of the Old Pretender, often referred to as Bonnie Prince Charlie or the Young Pretender, landed on the island of Eriskay in the Outer Hebrides.

=== Post-Jacobite politics ===
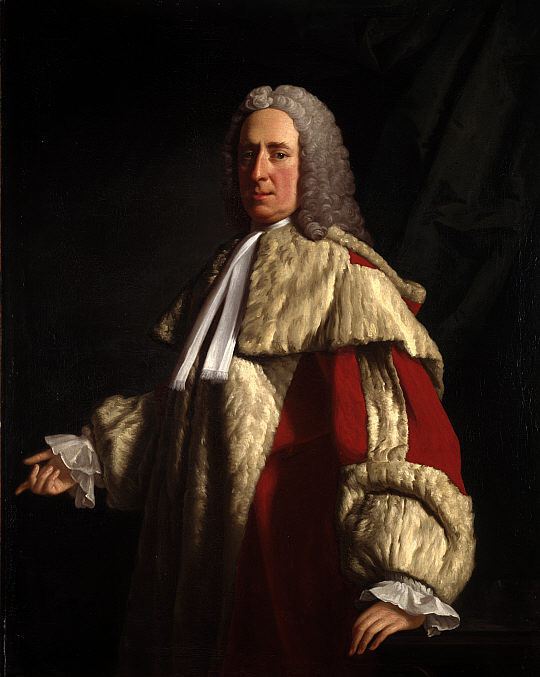
Archibald Campbell, 3rd Duke of Argyll, and dominant political figure in Scotland, 1720s–1761

With the advent of the Union and the demise of Jacobitism, access to London and the Empire opened up very attractive career opportunities for ambitious middle-class and upper-class Scots, who seized the chance to become entrepreneurs, intellectuals, and soldiers. Thousands of Scots, mainly Lowlanders, took up positions of power in politics, civil service, the army and navy, trade, economics, colonial enterprises and other areas across the nascent British Empire. Historian Neil Davidson notes that "after 1746 there was an entirely new level of participation by Scots in political life, particularly outside Scotland". Davidson also states that "far from being ‘peripheral’ to the British economy, Scotland – or more precisely, the Lowlands – lay at its core". British officials especially appreciated Scottish soldiers. As the Secretary of War told Parliament in 1751, "I am for having always in our army as many Scottish soldiers as possible...because they are generally more hardy and less mutinous". The national policy of aggressively recruiting Scots for senior civilian positions stirred up resentment among Englishmen, ranging from violent diatribes by John Wilkes, to vulgar jokes and obscene cartoons in the popular press, and the haughty ridicule by intellectuals such as Samuel Johnson that was much resented by Scots. In his great Dictionary Johnson defined oats as, "a grain, which in England is generally given to horses, but in Scotland supports the people." To which Lord Elibank retorted, "Very true, and where will you find such men and such horses?"

Scottish politics in the late 18th century was dominated by the Whigs, with the benign management of Archibald Campbell, 3rd Duke of Argyll (1682–1761), who was in effect the "viceroy of Scotland" from the 1720s until his death in 1761. Scotland generally supported the king with enthusiasm during the American Revolution. Henry Dundas (1742–1811) dominated political affairs in the latter part of the century. Dundas defeated advocates of intellectual and social change through his ruthless manipulation of patronage in alliance with Prime Minister William Pitt the Younger, until he lost power in 1806.

The main unit of local government was the parish, and since it was also part of the church, the elders imposed public humiliation for what the locals considered immoral behaviour, including fornication, drunkenness, wife beating, cursing and Sabbath breaking. The main focus was on the poor and the landlords ("lairds") and gentry, and their servants, were not subject to the parish's control. The policing system weakened after 1800 and disappeared in most places by the 1850s.

=== Collapse of the clan system ===
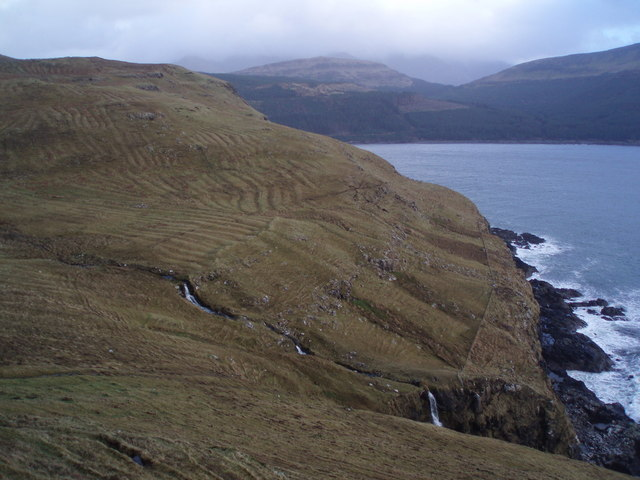
The remains of old run rig strips beside Loch Eynort, Isle of Skye. Run rig was the pre-clearance method of arable farming before agricultural improvements were introduced.

The clan system of the Highlands and Islands had been seen as a challenge to the rulers of Scotland from before the 17th century. James VI's various measures to exert control included the Statutes of Iona, an attempt to force clan leaders to become integrated into the rest of Scottish society. This started a slow process of change which, by the second half of the 18th century, saw clan chiefs start to think of themselves as commercial landlords, rather than as patriarchs of their people. To their tenants, initially this meant that monetary rents replaced those paid in kind. Later, rent increases became common. In the 1710s the Dukes of Argyll started putting leases of some of their land up for auction; by 1737 this was done across the Argyll property. This commercial attitude replaced the principle of dùthchas, which included the obligation on clan chiefs to provide land for clan members. The shift of this attitude slowly spread through the Highland elite (but not among their tenants).

As clan chiefs became more integrated into Scottish and British society, many of them built up large debts. It became easier to borrow against the security of a Highland estate from the 1770s onwards. As the lenders became predominantly people and organisations outside the Highlands, there was a greater willingness to foreclose if the borrower defaulted. Combined with an astounding level of financial incompetence among the Highland elite, this ultimately forced the sale of the estates of many Highland landed families over the period 1770–1850. (The greatest number of sales of whole estates was toward the end of this period.)

The Jacobite rebellion of 1745 gave a final period of importance to the ability of Highland clans to raise bodies of fighting men at short notice. With the defeat at Culloden, any enthusiasm for continued warfare disappeared and clan leaders returned to their transition to being commercial landlords. This was arguably accelerated by some of the punitive laws enacted after the rebellion. These included the Heritable Jurisdictions (Scotland) Act 1746 (20 Geo. 2. c. 43), which removed judicial roles from clan chiefs and gave them to the Scottish law courts. T. M. Devine warns against seeing a clear cause and effect relationship between the post-Culloden legislation and the collapse of clanship. He questions the basic effectiveness of the measures, quoting W. A. Speck who ascribes the pacification of the area more to "a disinclination to rebel than to the government's repressive measures." Devine points out that social change in Gaeldom did not pick up until the 1760s and 1770s, as this coincided with the increased market pressures from the industrialising and urbanising Lowlands.

The change of clan leaders from patriarchs of their people to commercial landowners gave rise to the first phase of the Highland clearances, with many tenant farmers being evicted and resettled in crofting communities.

In 1846 the Highland potato famine struck the crofting communities of the North and West Highlands. By 1850 the charitable relief effort was wound up, despite the continuing crop failure, and landlords, charities and the government resorted to encouraging emigration. The overall result was that almost 11,000 people were provided with "assisted passages" by their landlords between 1846 and 1856, with the greatest number travelling in 1851. A further 5,000 emigrated to Australia, through the Highland and Island Emigration Society. To this should be added an unknown, but significant number, who paid their own fares to emigrate, and a further unknown number assisted by the Colonial Land and Emigration Commission. This was out of a famine-affected population of about 200,000 people. Many of those who remained became even more involved in temporary migration for work in the Lowlands, both out of necessity during the famine and having become accustomed to working away by the time the famine ceased. Much longer periods were spent out of the Highlands – often for much of the year or more. One illustration of this migrant working was the estimated 30,000 men and women from the far west of the Gaelic speaking area who travelled to the east coast fishing ports for the herring fishing season – providing labour in an industry that grew by 60% between 1854 and 1884.

The clearances were followed by a period of even greater emigration from the Highlands, which continued (with a brief lull for the First World War) up to the start of the Great Depression.

=== Enlightenment ===
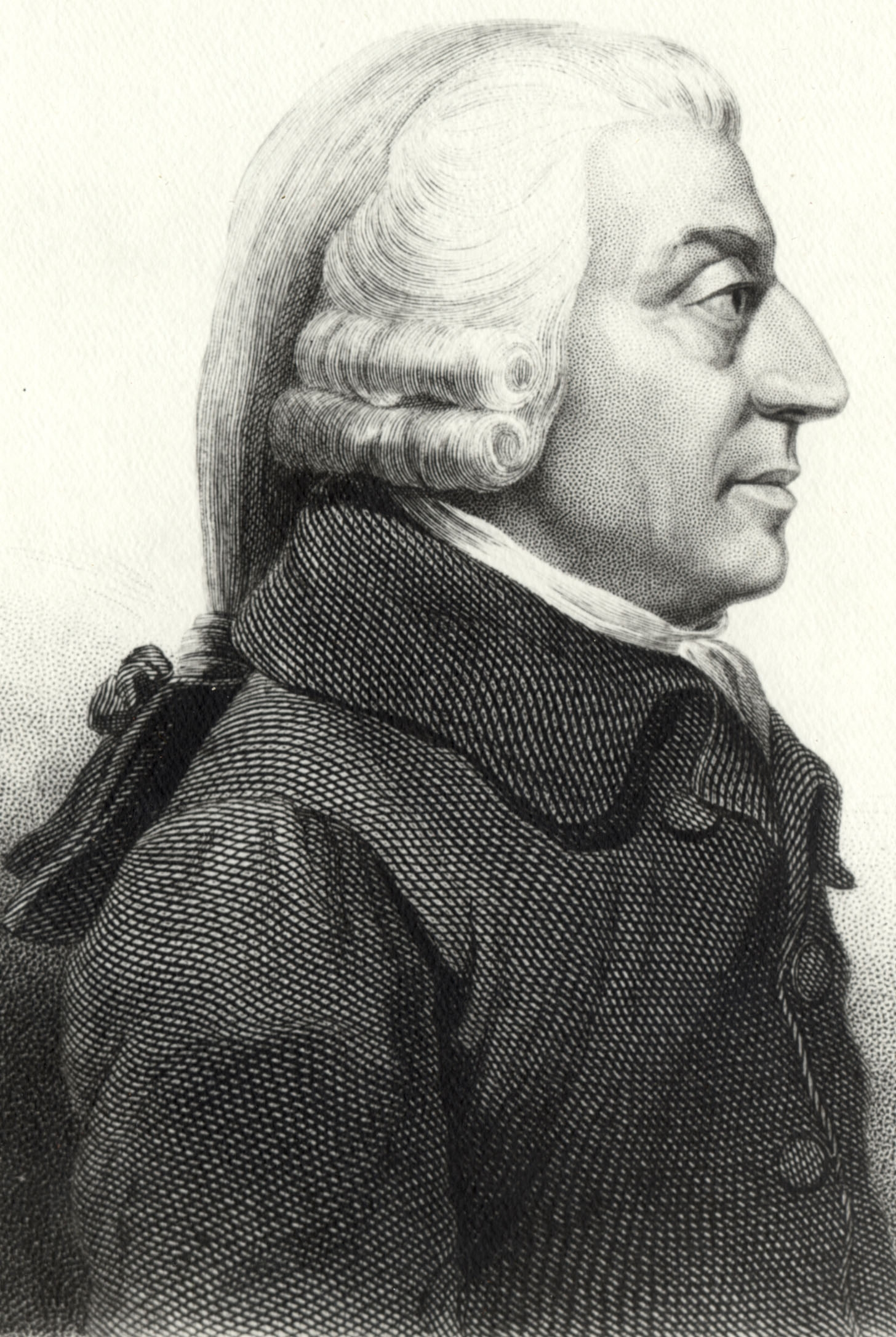
Adam Smith, the father of modern economics

Historian Jonathan Israel argues that by 1750 Scotland's major cities had created an intellectual infrastructure of mutually supporting institutions, such as universities, reading societies, libraries, periodicals, museums and masonic lodges. The Scottish network was "predominantly liberal Calvinist, Newtonian, and 'design' oriented in character which played a major role in the further development of the transatlantic Enlightenment ." In France Voltaire said "we look to Scotland for all our ideas of civilization", and the Scots in turn paid close attention to French ideas. Historian Bruce Lenman says their "central achievement was a new capacity to recognize and interpret social patterns."

The first major philosopher of the Scottish Enlightenment was Francis Hutcheson, who held the Chair of Philosophy at the University of Glasgow from 1729 to 1746. A moral philosopher who produced alternatives to the ideas of Thomas Hobbes, one of his major contributions to world thought was the utilitarian and consequentialist principle that virtue is that which provides, in his words, "the greatest happiness for the greatest numbers". Much of what is incorporated in the scientific method (the nature of knowledge, evidence, experience, and causation) and some modern attitudes towards the relationship between science and religion were developed by his protégés David Hume and Adam Smith. Hume became a major figure in the skeptical philosophical and empiricist traditions of philosophy. He and other Scottish Enlightenment thinkers developed what he called a 'science of man', which was expressed historically in works by authors including James Burnett, Adam Ferguson, John Millar and William Robertson, all of whom merged a scientific study of how humans behave in ancient and primitive cultures with a strong awareness of the determining forces of modernity. Modern sociology largely originated from this movement and Hume's philosophical concepts that directly influenced James Madison (and thus the United States Constitution) and when popularised by Dugald Stewart, would be the basis of classical liberalism. Adam Smith published The Wealth of Nations, often considered the first work on modern economics. It had an immediate impact on British economic policy and in the 21st century still framed discussions on globalisation and tariffs.

The focus of the Scottish Enlightenment ranged from intellectual and economic matters to the specifically scientific as in the work of the physician and chemist William Cullen, the agriculturalist and economist James Anderson, chemist and physician Joseph Black, natural historian John Walker and James Hutton, the first modern geologist.

=== Beginnings of industrialisation ===
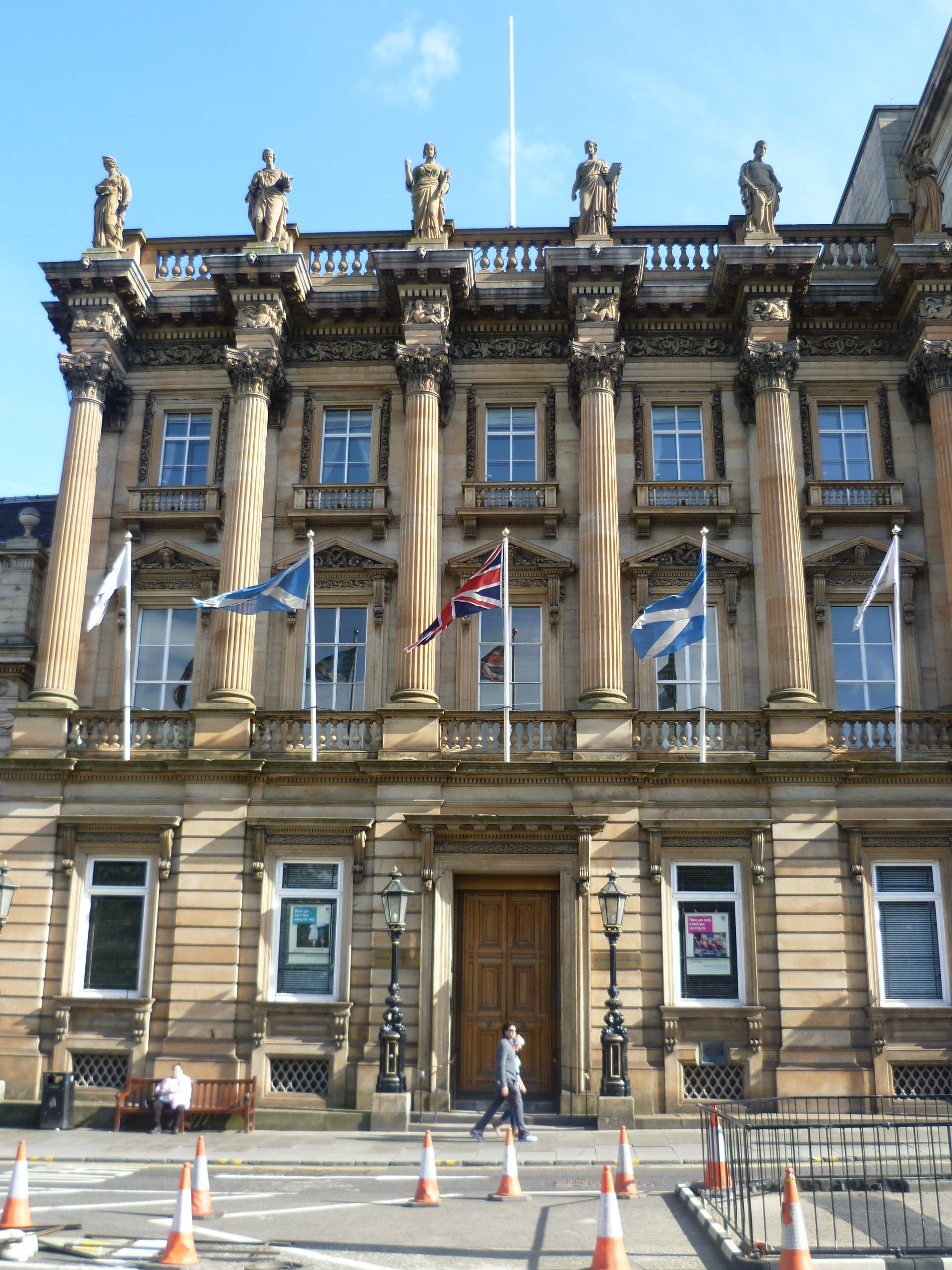
Former Head Office of the British Linen Bank in St Andrew Square, Edinburgh. Now offices of the Bank of Scotland.

With tariffs with England now abolished, the potential for trade for Scottish merchants was considerable. However, Scotland in 1750 was still a poor rural, agricultural society with a population of 1.3 million. Some progress was visible: agriculture in the Lowlands was steadily upgraded after 1700 and standards remained high. There were the sales of linen and cattle to England, the cash flows from military service, and the tobacco trade that was dominated by Glasgow Tobacco Lords after 1740. Merchants who profited from the American trade began investing in leather, textiles, iron, coal, sugar, rope, sailcloth, glassworks, breweries, and soapworks, setting the foundations for the city's emergence as a leading industrial centre after 1815. The tobacco trade collapsed during the American Revolution (1776–1783), when its sources were cut off by the British blockade of American ports. However, trade with the West Indies began to make up for the loss of the tobacco business, reflecting the British demand for sugar and the demand in the West Indies for herring and linen goods.

Linen was Scotland's premier industry in the 18th century and formed the basis for the later cotton, jute, and woollen industries. Scottish industrial policy was made by the board of trustees for Fisheries and Manufactures in Scotland, which sought to build an economy complementary, not competitive, with England. Since England had woollens, this meant linen. Encouraged and subsidised by the Board of Trustees so it could compete with German products, merchant entrepreneurs became dominant in all stages of linen manufacturing and built up the market share of Scottish linens, especially in the American colonial market. The British Linen Company, established in 1746, was the largest firm in the Scottish linen industry in the 18th century, exporting linen to England and America. As a joint-stock company, it had the right to raise funds through the issue of promissory notes or bonds. With its bonds functioning as bank notes, the company gradually moved into the business of lending and discounting to other linen manufacturers, and in the early 1770s banking became its main activity. It joined the established Scottish banks such as the Bank of Scotland (Edinburgh, 1695) and the Royal Bank of Scotland (Edinburgh, 1727). Glasgow would soon follow and Scotland had a flourishing financial system by the end of the century. There were over 400 branches, amounting to one office per 7,000 people, double the level in England, where banks were also more heavily regulated. Historians have emphasised that the flexibility and dynamism of the Scottish banking system contributed significantly to the rapid development of the economy in the 19th century.

German sociologist Max Weber mentioned Scottish Presbyterianism in The Protestant Ethic and the Spirit of Capitalism (1905), and many scholars argued that "this worldly asceticism" of Calvinism was integral to Scotland's rapid economic modernisation. More recent scholarship however emphasises other factors. These include technology transfers from England and the appeal of a highly mobile, low-cost labour-force for English investors like Richard Arkwright. Scotland's natural resources in water power, black-band ironstone and coal were also important foundations for mechanised industry.

=== Religious fragmentation ===
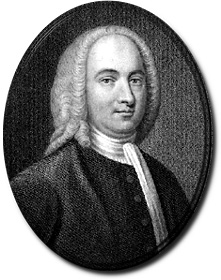
Ebenezer Erskine, whose actions led to the establishment of the Secession Church

In the 1690s the Presbyterian establishment purged the land of Episcopalians and heretics, and made blasphemy a capital crime. Thomas Aitkenhead, the son of an Edinburgh surgeon, aged 18, was indicted for blasphemy by order of the Privy Council for calling the New Testament "The History of the Imposter Christ"; he was hanged in 1696. Their extremism led to a reaction known as the "Moderate" cause that ultimately prevailed and opened the way for liberal thinking in the cities.

The early 18th century saw the beginnings of a fragmentation of the Church of Scotland. These fractures were prompted by issues of government and patronage, but reflected a wider division between the hard-line Evangelicals and the theologically more tolerant Moderate Party. The battle was over fears of fanaticism by the former and the promotion of Enlightenment ideas by the latter. The Patronage Act 1711 was a major blow to the evangelicals, for it meant that local landlords could choose the minister, not the members of the congregation. Schisms erupted as the evangelicals left the main body, starting in 1733 with the First Secession headed by figures including Ebenezer Erskine. The second schism in 1761 lead to the foundation of the independent Relief Church. These churches gained strength in the Evangelical Revival of the later 18th century. A key result was the main Presbyterian church was in the hands of the Moderate faction, which provided critical support for the Enlightenment in the cities.

Long after the triumph of the Church of Scotland in the Lowlands, Highlanders and Islanders clung to an old-fashioned Christianity infused with animistic folk beliefs and practices. The remoteness of the region and the lack of a Gaelic-speaking clergy undermined the missionary efforts of the established church. The later 18th century saw some success, owing to the efforts of the SSPCK missionaries and to the disruption of traditional society. Catholicism had been reduced to the fringes of the country, particularly the Gaelic-speaking areas of the Highlands and Islands. Conditions also grew worse for Catholics after the Jacobite rebellions and Catholicism was reduced to little more than a poorly run mission. Also important was Episcopalianism, which had retained supporters through the civil wars and changes of regime in the 17th century. Since most Episcopalians had given their support to the Jacobite rebellions in the early 18th century, they also suffered a decline in fortunes.

=== Literature ===
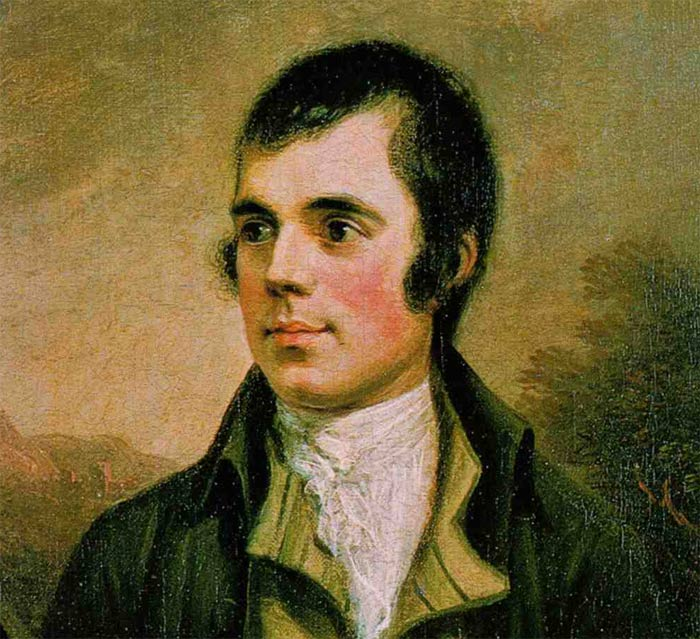
Robert Burns (1759–1796) exalted as Scotland's national poet.

Although Scotland increasingly adopted the English language and wider cultural norms, its literature developed a distinct national identity and began to enjoy an international reputation. Allan Ramsay (1686–1758) laid the foundations of a reawakening of interest in older Scottish literature, as well as leading the trend for pastoral poetry, helping to develop the Habbie stanza as a poetic form. James Macpherson was the first Scottish poet to gain an international reputation, claiming to have found poetry written by Ossian, he published translations that acquired international popularity, being proclaimed as a Celtic equivalent of the Classical epics. Fingal written in 1762 was speedily translated into many European languages, and its deep appreciation of natural beauty and the melancholy tenderness of its treatment of the ancient legend did more than any single work to bring about the Romantic movement in European, and especially in German, literature, influencing Herder and Goethe. Eventually it became clear that the poems were not direct translations from the Gaelic, but flowery adaptations made to suit the aesthetic expectations of his audience. Both the major literary figures of the following century, Robert Burns and Walter Scott, would be highly influenced by the Ossian cycle. Burns, an Ayrshire poet and lyricist, is widely regarded as the national poet of Scotland and a major figure in the Romantic movement. As well as making original compositions, Burns also collected folk songs from across Scotland, often revising or adapting them. His poem (and song) "Auld Lang Syne" is often sung at Hogmanay (the last day of the year), and "Scots Wha Hae" served for a long time as an unofficial national anthem of the country.

=== Education ===
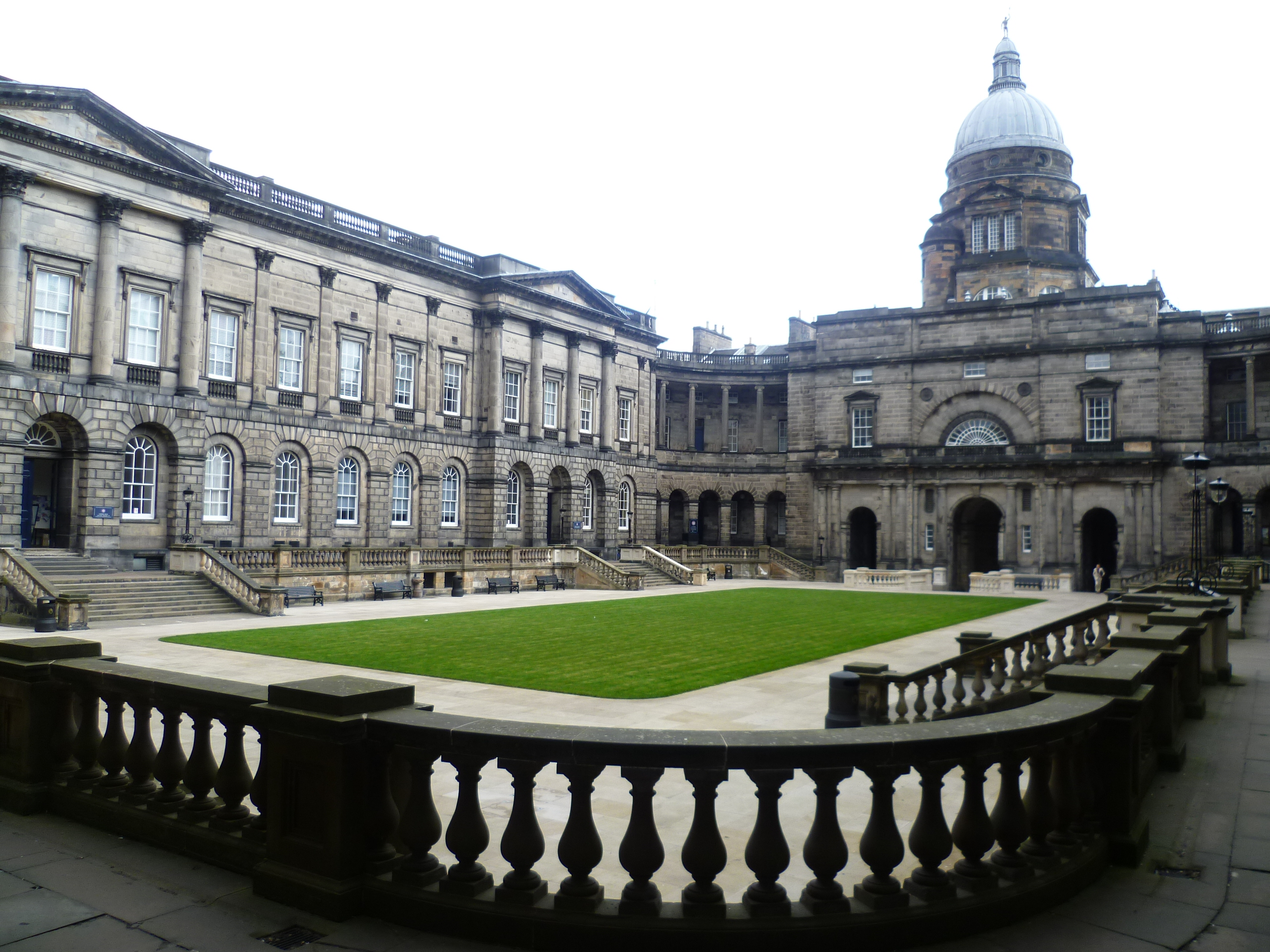
Old College, University of Edinburgh, rebuilt in 1789 according to plans drawn up by Robert Adam

A legacy of the Reformation in Scotland was the aim of having a school in every parish, which was underlined by an act of the Scottish parliament in 1696 (reinforced in 1801). In rural communities this obliged local landowners (heritors) to provide a schoolhouse and pay a schoolmaster, while ministers and local presbyteries oversaw the quality of the education. The headmaster or "dominie" was often university educated and enjoyed high local prestige. The kirk schools were active in the rural lowlands but played a minor role in the Highlands, the islands, and in the fast-growing industrial towns and cities. The schools taught in English, not in Gaelic, because that language was seen as a leftover of Catholicism and was not an expression of Scottish nationalism. In cities such as Glasgow the Catholics operated their own schools, which directed their youth into clerical and middle class occupations, as well as religious vocations.

A "democratic myth" emerged in the 19th century to the effect that many a "lad of pairts" had been able to rise up through the system to take high office and that literacy was much more widespread in Scotland than in neighbouring states, particularly England. Historical research has largely undermined the myth. Kirk schools were not free, attendance was not compulsory and they generally imparted only basic literacy such as the ability to read the Bible. Poor children, starting at age 7, were done by age 8 or 9; the majority were finished by age 11 or 12. The result was widespread basic reading ability; since there was an extra fee for writing, half the people never learned to write. Scots were not significantly better educated than the English and other contemporary nations. A few talented poor boys did go to university, but usually they were helped by aristocratic or gentry sponsors. Most of them became poorly paid teachers or ministers, and none became important figures in the Scottish Enlightenment or the Industrial Revolution.

By the 18th century there were five universities in Scotland, at Edinburgh, Glasgow, St. Andrews and King's and Marischial Colleges in Aberdeen, compared with only two in England. Originally oriented to clerical and legal training, after the religious and political upheavals of the 17th century they recovered with a lecture-based curriculum that was able to embrace economics and science, offering a high quality liberal education to the sons of the nobility and gentry. It helped the universities to become major centres of medical education and to put Scotland at the forefront of Enlightenment thinking.

== 19th century ==
An election advertisement for Scottish Labour leader Keir Hardie

Scotland's transformation into a rich leader of modern industry came suddenly and unexpectedly. The population grew steadily in the 19th century, from 1,608,000 in the census of 1801 to 2,889,000 in 1851 and 4,472,000 in 1901. The economy, long based on agriculture, began to industrialise after 1790. At first the leading industry, based in the west, was the spinning and weaving of cotton. In 1861, the American Civil War suddenly cut off the supplies of raw cotton and the industry never recovered. Thanks to its many entrepreneurs and engineers, and its large stock of easily mined coal, Scotland became a world centre for engineering, shipbuilding, and locomotive construction, with steel replacing iron after 1870.

=== Party politics ===
The Scottish Reform Act 1832 increased the number of Scottish MPs and significantly widened the franchise to include more of the middle classes. From this point until the end of the century, the Whigs and (after 1859) their successors the Liberal Party, managed to gain a majority of the Westminster Parliamentary seats for Scotland, although these were often outnumbered by the much larger number of English and Welsh Conservatives. The English-educated Scottish peer Lord Aberdeen (1784–1860) led a coalition government from 1852 to 1855, but in general very few Scots held office in the government. From the mid-century there were increasing calls for Home Rule for Scotland and when the Conservative Lord Salisbury became prime minister in 1885 he responded to pressure by reviving the post of Secretary of State for Scotland, which had been in abeyance since 1746. He appointed the Duke of Richmond, a wealthy landowner who was both Chancellor of Aberdeen University and Lord Lieutenant of Banff. Towards the end of the century Prime Ministers of Scottish descent included the Tory, Peelite and Liberal William Gladstone, who held the office four times between 1868 and 1894. The first Scottish Liberal to become prime minister was the Earl of Rosebery, from 1894 to 1895, like Aberdeen before him a product of the English education system. In the later 19th century the issue of Irish Home Rule led to a split among the Liberals, with a minority breaking away to form the Liberal Unionists in 1886. The growing importance of the working classes was marked by Keir Hardie's success in the 1888 Mid Lanarkshire by-election, leading to the foundation of the Scottish Labour Party, which was absorbed into the Independent Labour Party in 1895, with Hardie as its first leader.

=== Industrial expansion ===
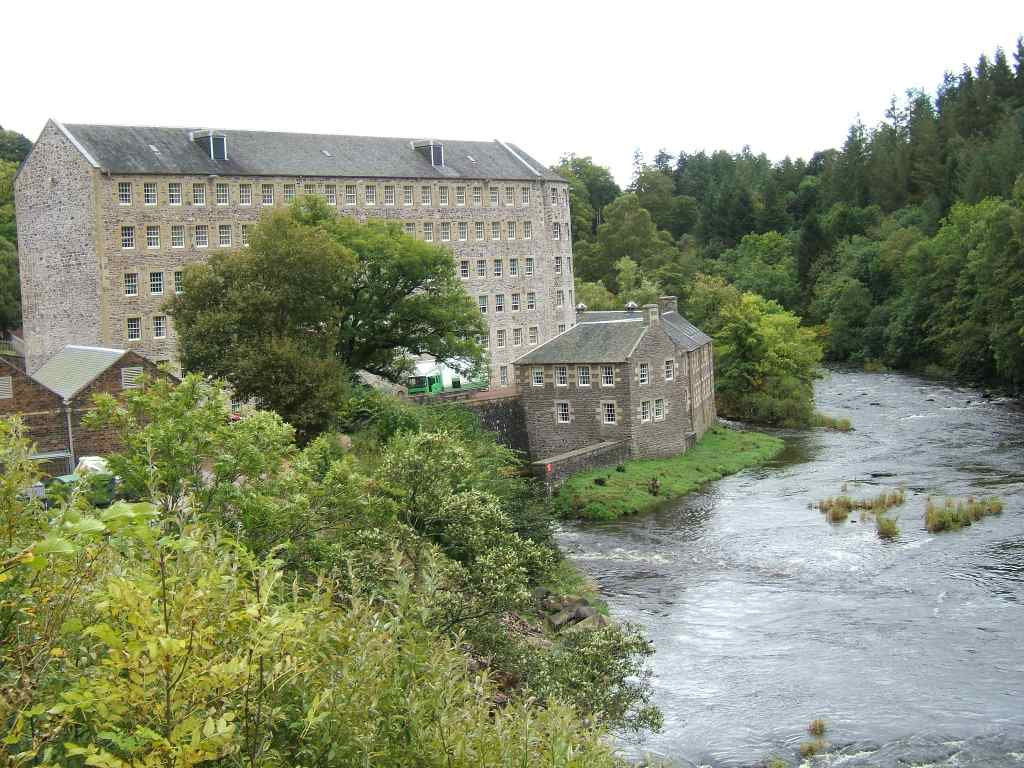
New Lanark cotton mill on the banks of the River Clyde, founded in 1786.

From about 1790 textiles became the most important industry in the west of Scotland, especially the spinning and weaving of cotton, which flourished until in 1861 the American Civil War cut off the supplies of raw cotton. The industry never recovered, but by that time Scotland had developed heavy industries based on its coal and iron resources. The invention of the hot blast for smelting iron (1828) revolutionised the Scottish iron industry. As a result, Scotland became a centre for engineering, shipbuilding and the production of locomotives. Toward the end of the 19th century, steel production largely replaced iron production. Coal mining continued to grow into the 20th century, producing the fuel to heat homes, factories and drive steam engines locomotives and steamships. By 1914, there were 1,000,000 coal miners in Scotland. The stereotype emerged early on of Scottish colliers as brutish, non-religious and socially isolated serfs; that was an exaggeration, for their life style resembled the miners everywhere, with a strong emphasis on masculinity, equalitarianism, group solidarity, and support for radical labour movements.

Britain was the world leader in the construction of railways, and their use to expand trade and coal supplies. The first successful locomotive-powered line in Scotland, between Monkland and Kirkintilloch, opened in 1831. Not only was good passenger service established by the late 1840s, but an excellent network of freight lines reduce the cost of shipping coal, and made products manufactured in Scotland competitive throughout Britain. For example, railways opened the London market to Scottish beef and milk. They enabled the Aberdeen Angus to become a cattle breed of worldwide reputation. By 1900, Scotland had 3500 miles of railway; their main economic contribution was moving supplies in and product out for heavy industry, especially coal-mining.

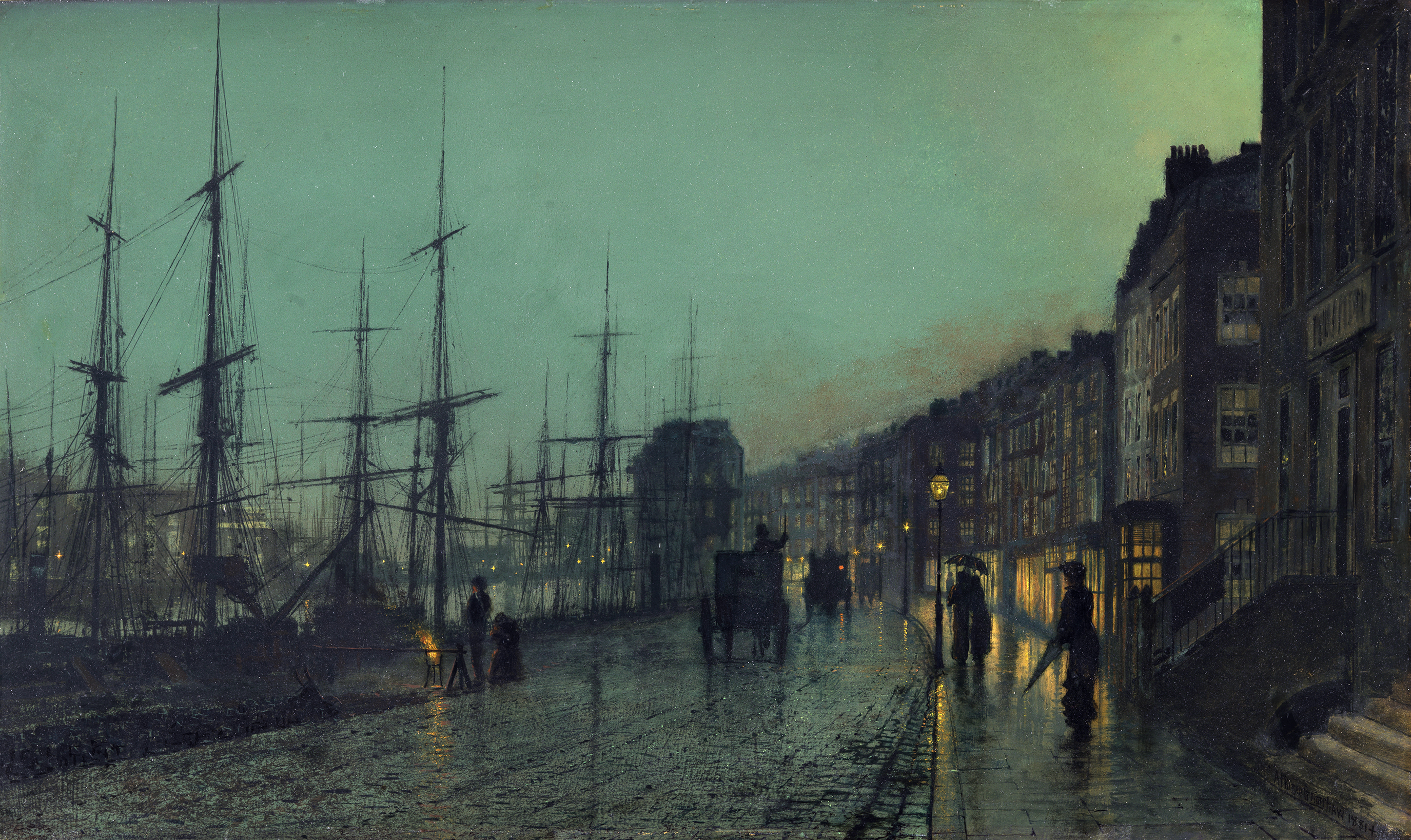
Shipping on the Clyde, by John Atkinson Grimshaw, 1881

Scotland was already one of the most urbanised societies in Europe by 1800. The industrial belt ran across the country from southwest to northeast; by 1900 the four industrialised counties of Lanarkshire, Renfrewshire, Dunbartonshire, and Ayrshire contained 44 per cent of the population. Glasgow became one of the largest cities in the world, and known as "the Second City of the Empire" after London. Shipbuilding on Clydeside (the river Clyde through Glasgow and other points) began when the first small yards were opened in 1712 at the Scott family's shipyard at Greenock. After 1860, the Clydeside shipyards specialised in steamships made of iron (after 1870, made of steel), which rapidly replaced the wooden sailing vessels of both the merchant fleets and the battle fleets of the world. It became the world's pre-eminent shipbuilding centre. Clydebuilt became an industry benchmark of quality, and the river's shipyards were given contracts for warships.

=== Public health and welfare ===
The industrial developments, while they brought work and wealth, were so rapid that housing, town-planning, and provision for public health did not keep pace with them, and for a time living conditions in some of the towns and cities were notoriously bad, with overcrowding, high infant mortality, and growing rates of tuberculosis. The companies attracted rural workers, as well as immigrants from Catholic Ireland, by inexpensive company housing that was a dramatic move upward from the inner-city slums. This paternalistic policy led many owners to endorse government sponsored housing programs as well as self-help projects among the respectable working class.

=== Intellectual life ===
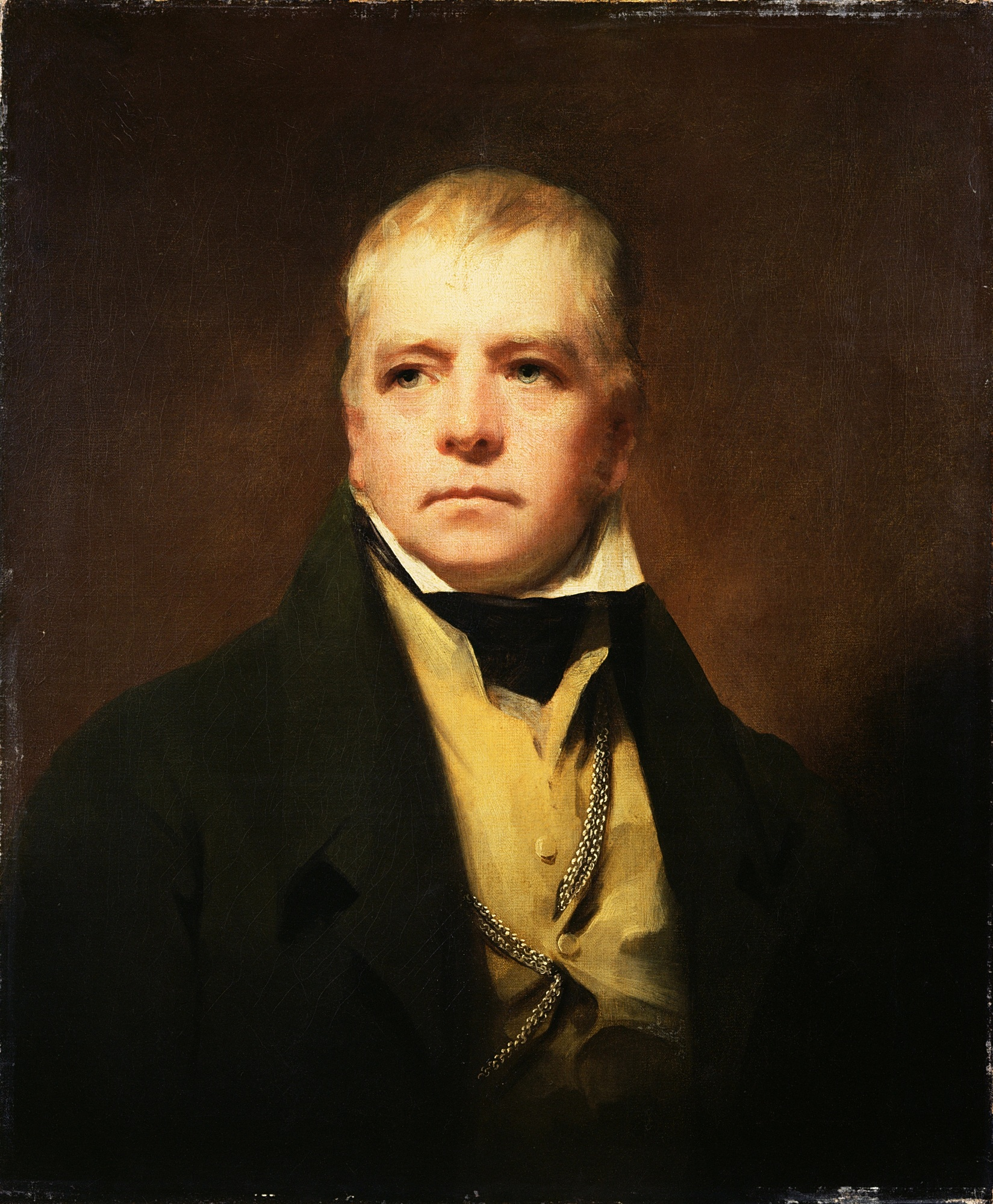
Walter Scott, whose Waverley Novels helped define Scottish identity in the 19th century

While the Scottish Enlightenment is traditionally considered to have concluded toward the end of the 18th century, disproportionately large Scottish contributions to British science and letters continued for another 50 years or more, thanks to such figures as the mathematicians and physicists James Clerk Maxwell, Lord Kelvin, and the engineers and inventors James Watt and William Murdoch, whose work was critical to the technological developments of the Industrial Revolution throughout Britain.

In literature the most successful figure of the mid-nineteenth century was Walter Scott, who began as a poet and also collected and published Scottish ballads. His first prose work, Waverley in 1814, is often called the first historical novel. It launched a highly successful career that probably more than any other helped define and popularise Scottish cultural identity. In the late 19th century, a number of Scottish-born authors achieved international reputations. Robert Louis Stevenson's work included the urban Gothic novella Strange Case of Dr Jekyll and Mr Hyde (1886), and played a major part in developing the historical adventure in books like Kidnapped and Treasure Island. Arthur Conan Doyle's Sherlock Holmes stories helped found the tradition of detective fiction. The "kailyard tradition" at the end of the century, brought elements of fantasy and folklore back into fashion as can be seen in the work of figures like J. M. Barrie, most famous for his creation of Peter Pan, and George MacDonald, whose works, including Phantasies, played a major part in the creation of the fantasy genre.

Scotland also played a major part in the development of art and architecture. The Glasgow School, which developed in the late 19th century, and flourished in the early 20th century, produced a distinctive blend of influences including the Celtic Revival the Arts and Crafts Movement, and Japonisme, which found favour throughout the modern art world of continental Europe and helped define the Art Nouveau style. Among the most prominent members were the loose collective of The Four: acclaimed architect Charles Rennie Mackintosh, his wife the painter and glass artist Margaret MacDonald, her sister the artist Frances, and her husband, the artist and teacher Herbert MacNair.

=== Decline and romanticism of the Highlands ===
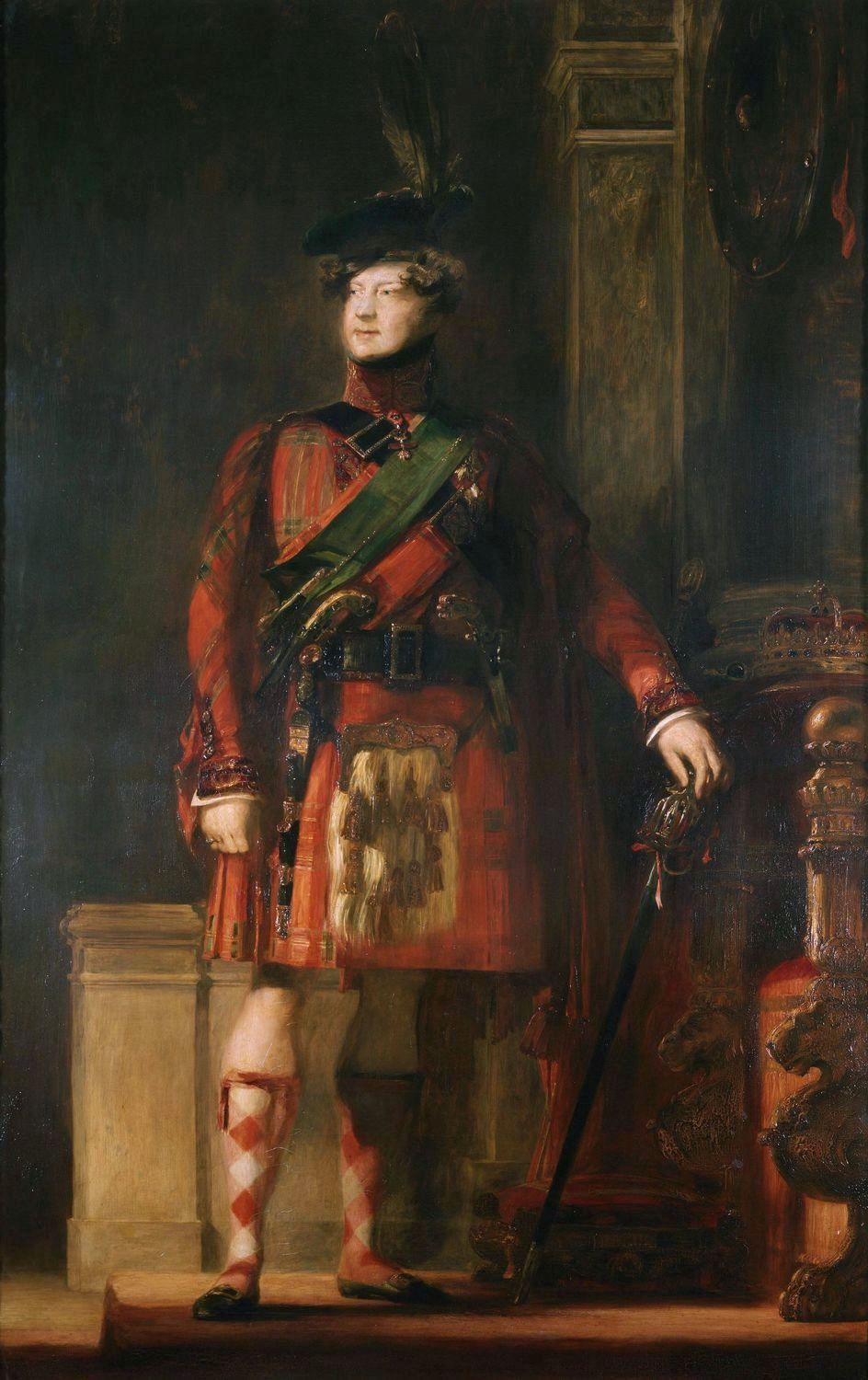
George IV in Highland Dress, David Wilkie's flattering portrait of the kilted King George IV

This period saw a process of rehabilitation for highland culture. Tartan had already been adopted for highland regiments in the British army, which poor highlanders joined in large numbers until the end of the Napoleonic Wars in 1815, but by the 19th century it had largely been abandoned by the ordinary people. In the 1820s, as part of the Romantic revival, tartan and the kilt were adopted by members of the social elite, not just in Scotland, but across Europe, prompted by the popularity of Macpherson's Ossian cycle and then Walter Scott's Waverley novels. The world paid attention to their literary redefinition of Scottishness, as they forged an image largely based on characteristics in polar opposition to those associated with England and modernity. This new identity made it possible for Scottish culture to become integrated into a wider European and North American context, not to mention tourist sites, but it also locked in a sense of "otherness" which Scotland began to shed only in the late 20th century. Scott's "staging" of the royal Visit of King George IV to Scotland in 1822 and the king's wearing of tartan, resulted in a massive upsurge in demand for kilts and tartans that could not be met by the Scottish linen industry. The designation of individual clan tartans was largely defined in this period and became a major symbol of Scottish identity. The fashion for all things Scottish was maintained by Queen Victoria, who helped secure the identity of Scotland as a tourist resort, with Balmoral Castle in Aberdeenshire becoming a major royal residence from 1852.

=== Land use and ownership ===
Despite these changes the highlands remained very poor and traditional, with few connections to the uplift of the Scottish Enlightenment and little role in the Industrial Revolution. A handful of powerful families, typified by the dukes of Argyll, Atholl, Buccleuch, and Sutherland, owned large amounts of land and controlled local political, legal and economic affairs. Particularly after the end of the boom created by the Revolutionary and Napoleonic Wars (1790–1815), these landlords needed cash to maintain their position in London society, and had less need of soldiers. They turned to money rents, displaced farmers to raise sheep, and downplayed the traditional patriarchal relationship that had historically sustained the clans. Potato blight reached the Highlands in 1846, where 150,000 people faced disaster because their food supply was largely potatoes (with a little herring, oatmeal and milk). They were rescued by an effective emergency relief system that stands in dramatic contrast to the failures of relief in Ireland. As the famine continued, landlords, charities and government agencies provided "assisted passages" for destitute tenants to emigrate to Canada and Australia; in excess of 16,000 people emigrated, with most travelling in 1851.

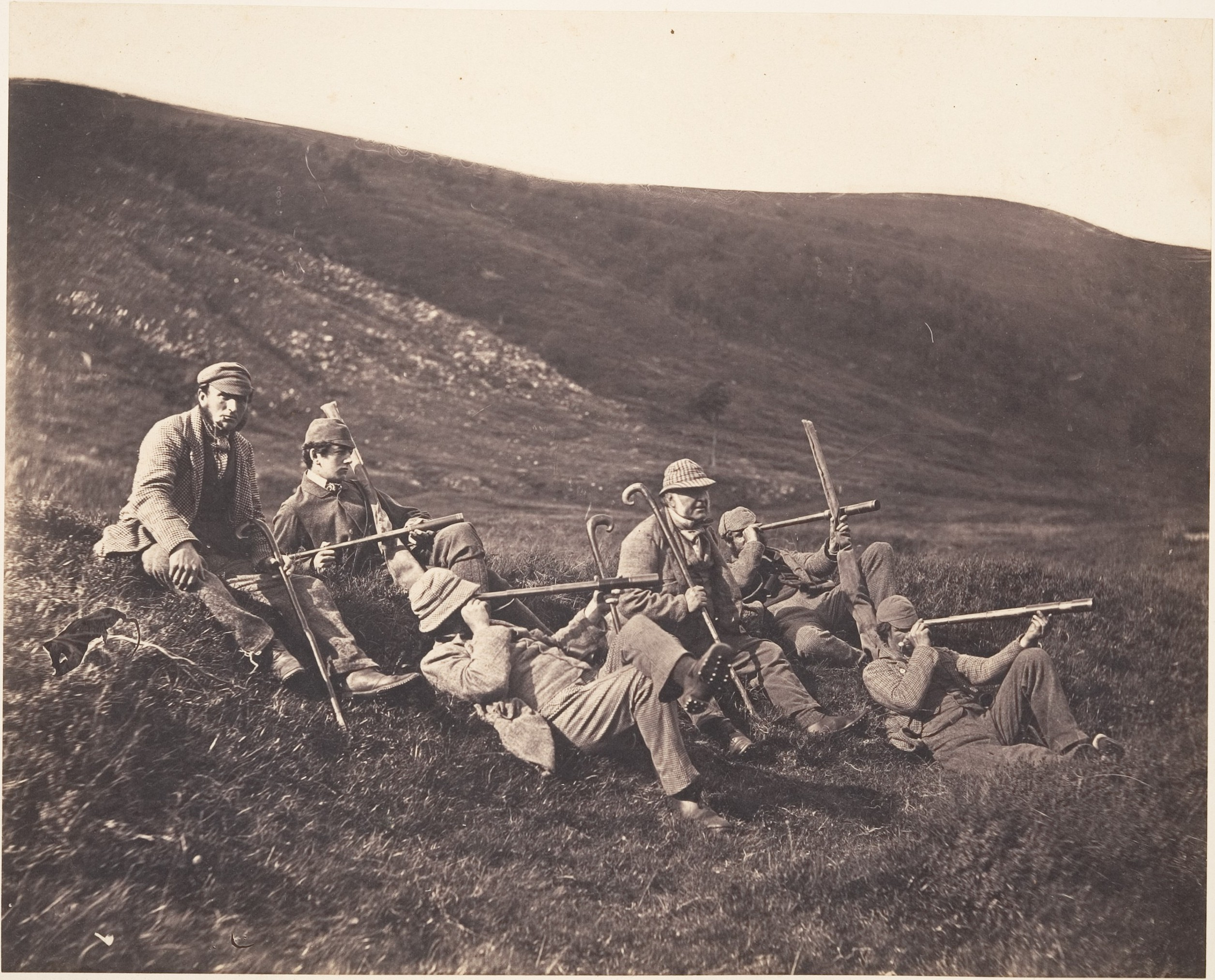
Deer stalkers on Glenfeshie Estate spying with telescopes, c. 1858

Caused by the advent of refrigeration and imports of lamb, mutton and wool from overseas, the 1870s brought with them a collapse of sheep prices and an abrupt halt in the previous sheep farming boom. Land prices subsequently plummeted, too, and accelerated the process of the so-called "Balmoralisation" of Scotland, an era in the second half of the 19th century that saw an increase in tourism and the establishment of large estates dedicated to field sports like deer stalking and grouse shooting, especially in the Scottish Highlands. The process was named after Balmoral estate, purchased by Queen Victoria in 1848, that fueled the romanticisation of upland Scotland and initiated an influx of the newly wealthy acquiring similar estates in the following decades. By the late 19th century just 118 people owned half of Scotland, with nearly 60 per cent of the whole country being part of shooting estates. While their relative importance has somewhat declined due to changing recreational interests throughout the 20th century, deer stalking and grouse shooting remain of prime importance on many private estates in Scotland.

=== Rural life ===
The unequal concentration of land ownership remained an emotional subject and eventually became a cornerstone of liberal radicalism. The politically powerless poor crofters embraced the popularly oriented, fervently evangelical Presbyterian revival after 1800, and the breakaway "Free Church" after 1843. This evangelical movement was led by lay preachers who themselves came from the lower strata, and whose preaching was implicitly critical of the established order. This energised the crofters and separated them from the landlords, preparing them for their successful and violent challenge to the landlords in the 1880s through the Highland Land League. Violence began on the Isle of Skye when Highland landlords cleared their lands for sheep and deer parks. It was quieted when the government stepped in passing the Crofters' Holdings (Scotland) Act, 1886 to reduce rents, guarantee fixity of tenure, and break up large estates to provide crofts for the homeless. In 1885, three Independent Crofter candidates were elected to Parliament, leading to explicit security for the Scottish smallholders; the legal right to bequeath tenancies to descendants; and creating a Crofting Commission. The Crofters as a political movement faded away by 1892, and the Liberal Party gained most of their votes.

=== Emigration ===
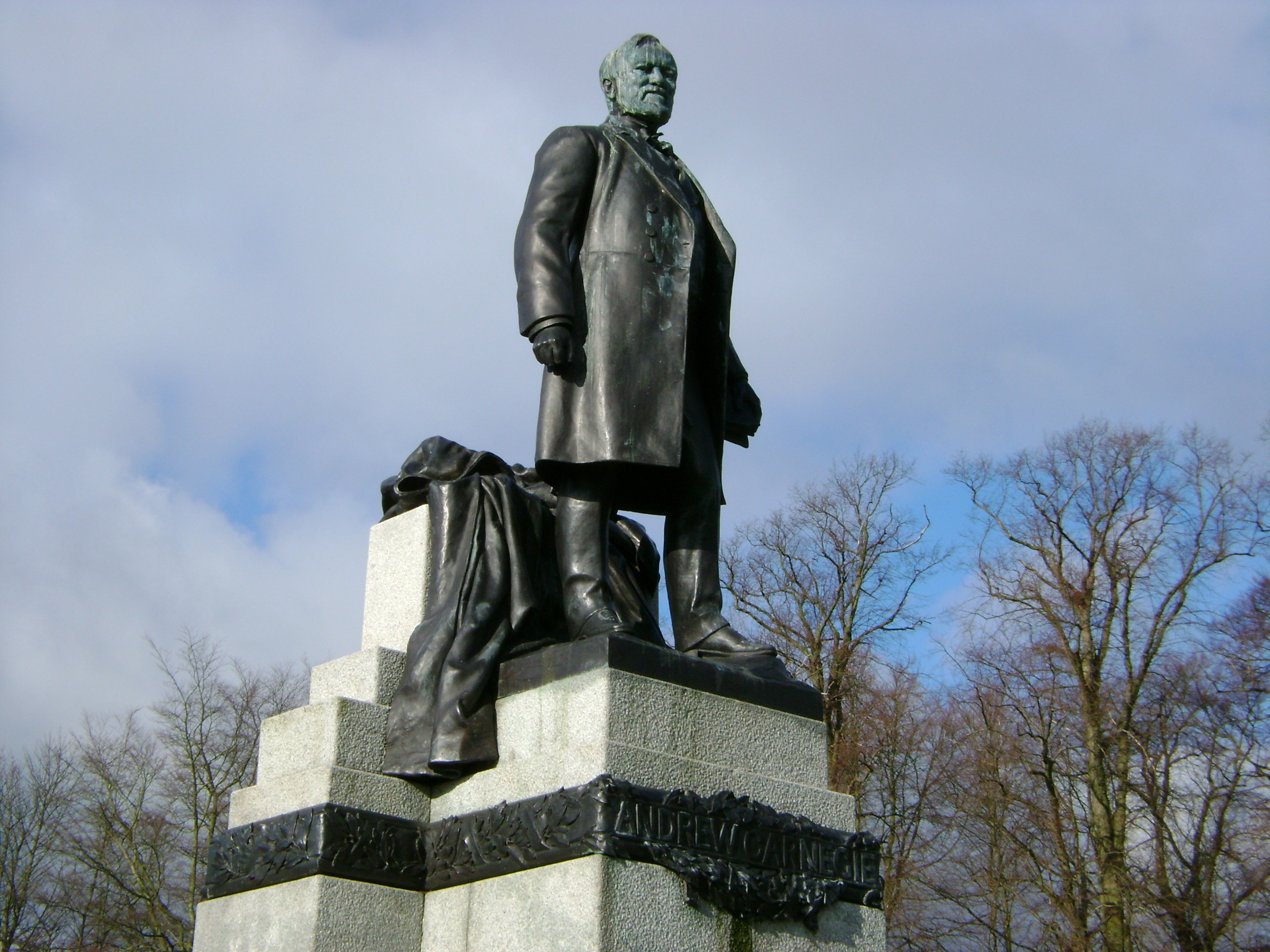
Statue of industrialist Andrew Carnegie in his home town of Dunfermline

The population of Scotland grew steadily in the 19th century, from 1,608,000 in the census of 1801 to 2,889,000 in 1851 and 4,472,000 in 1901. Even with the development of industry there were insufficient good jobs; as a result, during the period 1841–1931, about 2 million Scots emigrated to North America and Australia, and another 750,000 Scots relocated to England. Scotland lost a much higher proportion of its population than England and Wales, reaching perhaps as much as 30.2 per cent of its natural increase from the 1850s onwards. This not only limited Scotland's population increase, but meant that almost every family lost members due to emigration and, because more of them were young males, it skewed the sex and age ratios of the country.

Scots-born emigrants that played a leading role in the foundation and development of the United States included cleric and revolutionary John Witherspoon, sailor John Paul Jones, industrialist and philanthropist Andrew Carnegie, and scientist and inventor Alexander Graham Bell. In Canada they included soldier and governor of Quebec James Murray, Prime Minister John A. Macdonald and politician and social reformer Tommy Douglas. For Australia they included soldier and governor Lachlan Macquarie, governor and scientist Thomas Brisbane and Prime Minister Andrew Fisher. For New Zealand they included politician Peter Fraser and outlaw James Mckenzie. By the 21st century, there would be about as many people who were Scottish Canadians and Scottish Americans as the 5 million remaining in Scotland.

=== Religious schism and revival ===
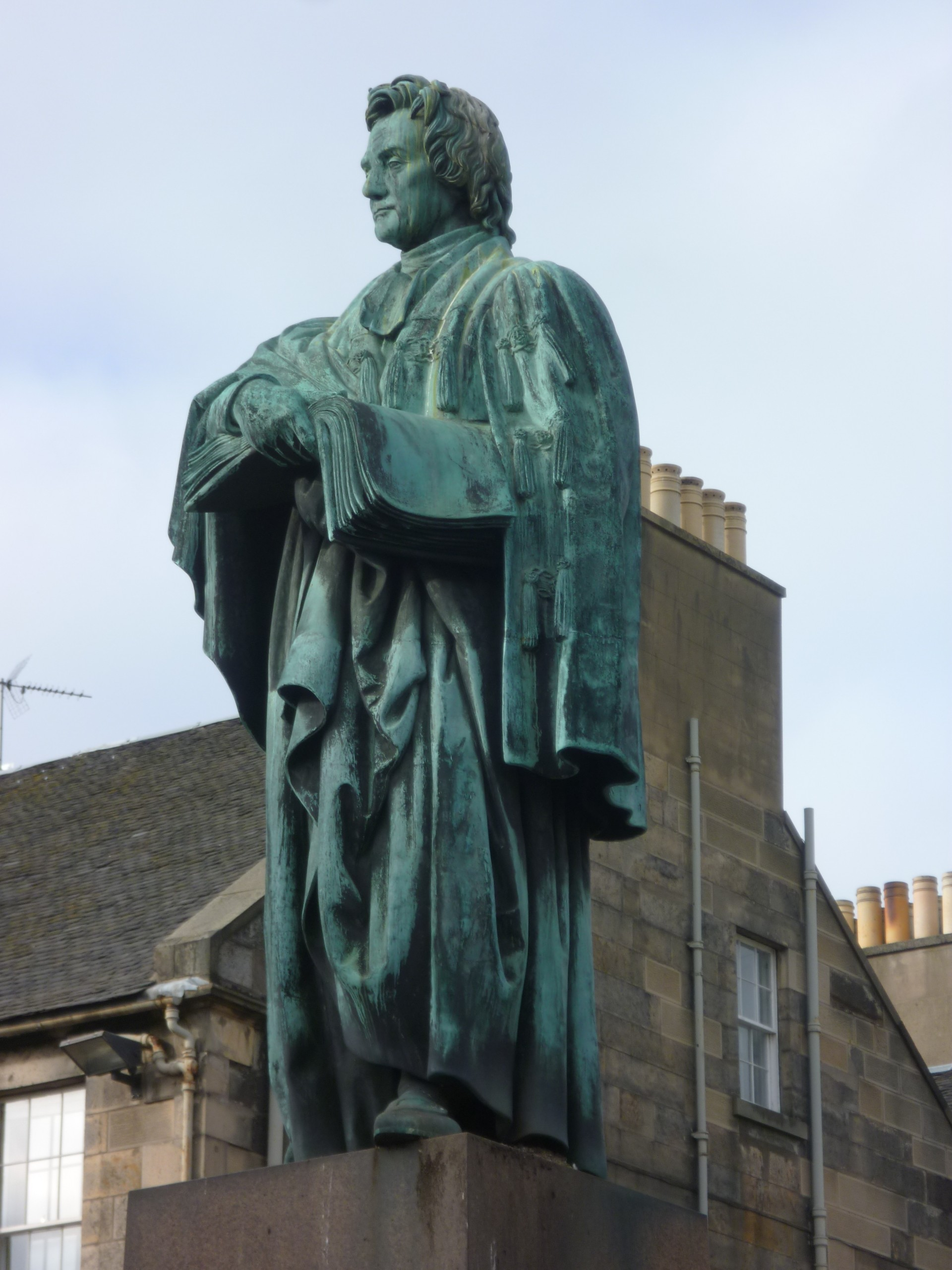
Thomas Chalmers statue in George Street, Edinburgh

After prolonged years of struggle, in 1834 the Evangelicals gained control of the General Assembly and passed the Veto Act, which allowed congregations to reject unwanted "intrusive" presentations to livings by patrons. The following "Ten Years' Conflict" of legal and political wrangling ended in defeat for the non-intrusionists in the civil courts. The result was a schism from the church by some of the non-intrusionists led by Dr Thomas Chalmers known as the Great Disruption of 1843. Roughly a third of the clergy, mainly from the North and Highlands, formed the separate Free Church of Scotland. The evangelical Free Churches, which were more accepting of Gaelic language and culture, grew rapidly in the Highlands and Islands, appealing much more strongly than did the established church. Chalmers's ideas shaped the breakaway group. He stressed a social vision that revived and preserved Scotland's communal traditions at a time of strain on the social fabric of the country. Chalmers's idealised small equalitarian, kirk-based, self-contained communities that recognised the individuality of their members and the need for co-operation. That vision also affected the mainstream Presbyterian churches, and by the 1870s it had been assimilated by the established Church of Scotland. Chalmers's ideals demonstrated that the church was concerned with the problems of urban society, and they represented a real attempt to overcome the social fragmentation that took place in industrial towns and cities.

In the late 19th century the major debates were between fundamentalist Calvinists and theological liberals, who rejected a literal interpretation of the Bible. This resulted in a further split in the Free Church as the rigid Calvinists broke away to form the Free Presbyterian Church in 1893. There were, however, also moves towards reunion, beginning with the unification of some secessionist churches into the United Secession Church in 1820, which united with the Relief Church in 1847 to form the United Presbyterian Church, which in turn joined with the Free Church in 1900 to form the United Free Church of Scotland. The removal of legislation on lay patronage would allow the majority of the Free Church to rejoin Church of Scotland in 1929. The schisms left small denominations including the Free Presbyterians and a remnant that had not merged in 1900 as the Free Church.

Catholic Emancipation in 1829 and the influx of large numbers of Irish immigrants, particularly after the famine years of the late 1840s, principally to the growing lowland centres like Glasgow, led to a transformation in the fortunes of Catholicism. In 1878, despite opposition, a Roman Catholic ecclesiastical hierarchy was restored to the country, and Catholicism became a significant denomination within Scotland. Episcopalianism also revived in the 19th century as the issue of succession receded, becoming established as the Episcopal Church in Scotland in 1804, as an autonomous organisation in communion with the Church of England. Baptist, Congregationalist and Methodist churches had appeared in Scotland in the 18th century, but did not begin significant growth until the 19th century, partly because more radical and evangelical traditions already existed within the Church of Scotland and the free churches. From 1879 they were joined by the evangelical revivalism of the Salvation Army, which attempted to make major inroads in the growing urban centres.

=== Development of state education ===
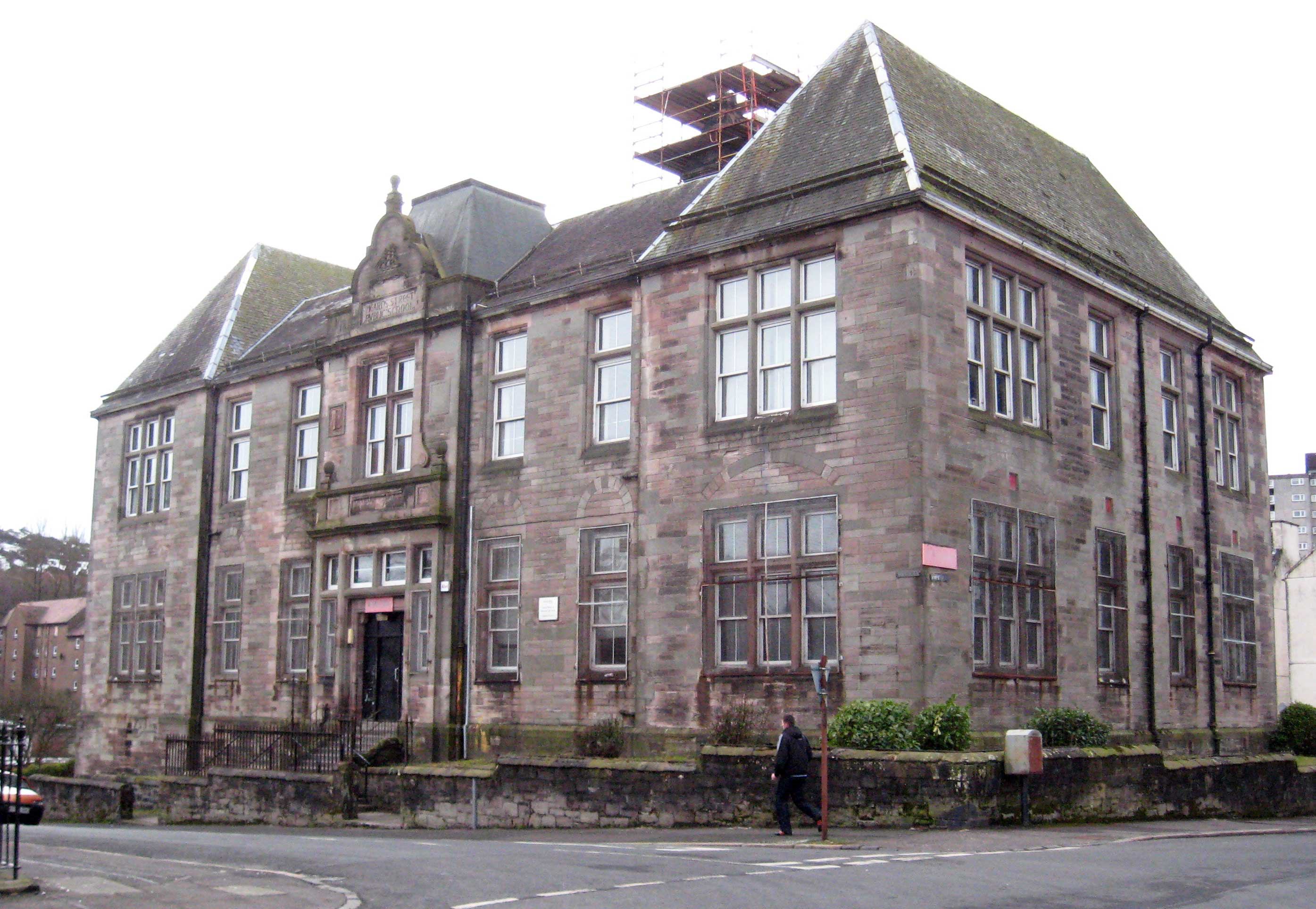
The Mearns Street Public School built for the Greenock Burgh School Board.

Industrialisation, urbanisation and the Disruption of 1843 all undermined the tradition of parish schools. From 1830 the state began to fund buildings with grants, then from 1846 it was funding schools by direct sponsorship, and in 1872 Scotland moved to a system like that in England of state-sponsored largely free schools, run by local school boards. Overall administration was in the hands of the Scotch (later Scottish) Education Department in London. Education was now compulsory from five to thirteen and many new board schools were built. Larger urban school boards established "higher grade" (secondary) schools as a cheaper alternative to the burgh schools. The Scottish Education Department introduced a Leaving Certificate Examination in 1888 to set national standards for secondary education and in 1890 school fees were abolished, creating a state-funded national system of free basic education and common examinations.

At the beginning of the 19th century, Scottish universities had no entrance exam, students typically entered at ages of 15 or 16, attended for as little as two years, chose which lectures to attend and could leave without qualifications. After two commissions of enquiry in 1826 and 1876 and reforming acts of parliament in 1858 and 1889, the curriculum and system of graduation were reformed to meet the needs of the emerging middle classes and the professions. Entrance examinations equivalent to the School Leaving Certificate were introduced and average ages of entry rose to 17 or 18. Standard patterns of graduation in the arts curriculum offered 3-year ordinary and 4-year honours degrees and separate science faculties were able to move away from the compulsory Latin, Greek and philosophy of the old MA curriculum. The historic University of Glasgow became a leader in British higher education by providing the educational needs of youth from the urban and commercial classes, as well as the upper class. It prepared students for non-commercial careers in government, the law, medicine, education, and the ministry and a smaller group for careers in science and engineering. St Andrews pioneered the admission of women to Scottish universities, creating the Lady Licentiate in Arts (LLA), which proved highly popular. From 1892 Scottish universities could admit and graduate women and the numbers of women at Scottish universities steadily increased until the early 20th century.

== Early 20th century ==
=== Fishing ===
The years before the First World War were the golden age of the inshore fisheries. Landings reached new heights, and Scottish catches dominated Europe's herring trade, accounting for a third of the British catch. High productivity came about thanks to the transition to more productive steam-powered boats, while the rest of Europe's fishing fleets were slower because they were still powered by sails.

=== Political realignment ===
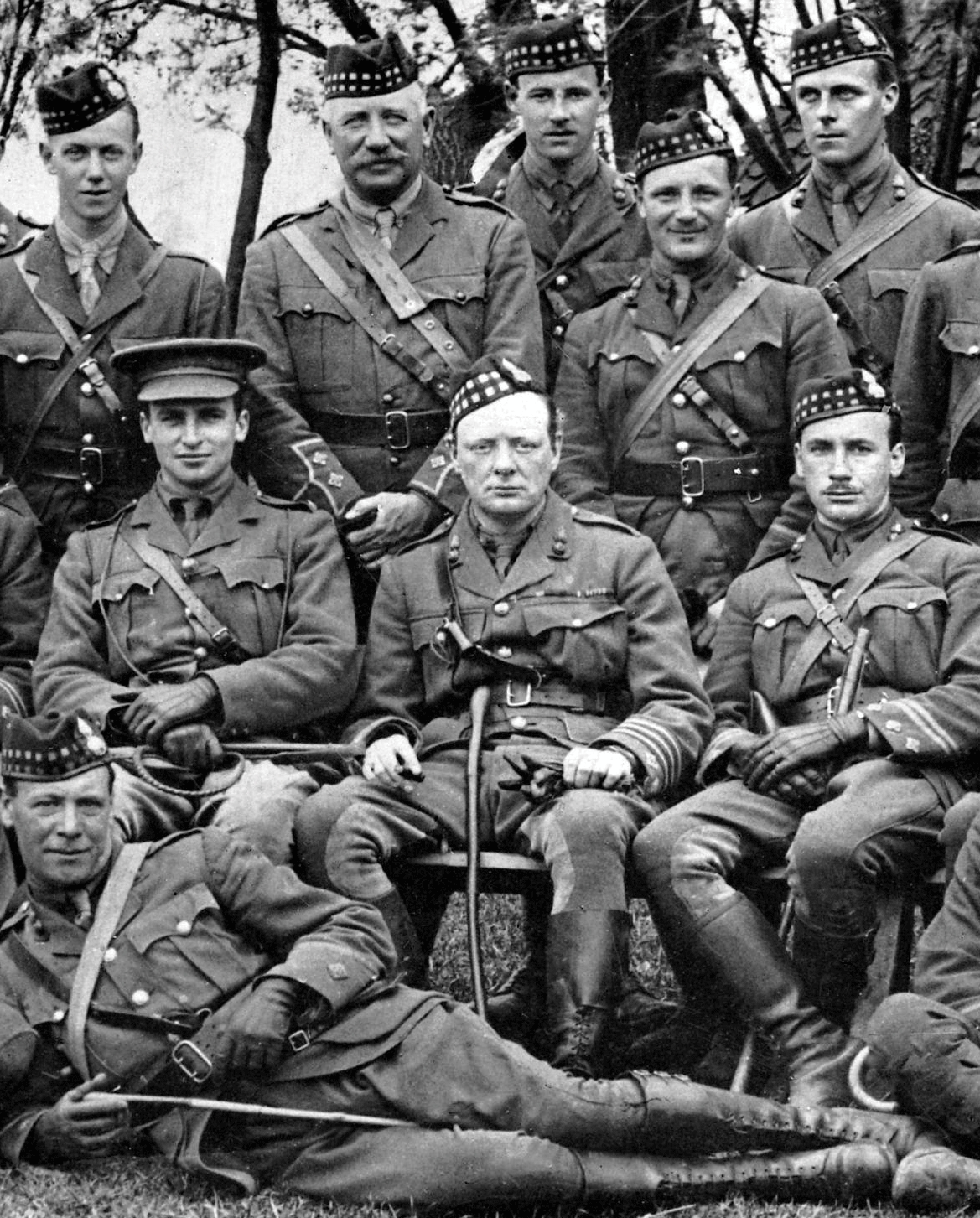
Winston Churchill with the Royal Scots Fusiliers near the Western Front in 1916

In the Khaki Election of 1900, nationalist concern with the Boer War meant that the Conservatives and their Liberal Unionist allies gained a majority of Scottish seats for the first time, although the Liberals regained their ascendancy in the next election. The Unionists and Conservatives merged in 1912, usually known as the Conservatives in England and Wales, they adopted the name Unionist Party in Scotland. Scots played a major part in the leadership of UK political parties producing a Conservative Prime Minister in Arthur Balfour (1902–1905) and a Liberal one in Henry Campbell-Bannerman (1905–1908). Various organisations, including the Independent Labour Party, joined to make the British Labour Party in 1906, with Keir Hardie as its first chairman.

=== First World War (1914–1918) ===
Scotland played a major role in the British effort in the First World War. It especially provided manpower, ships, machinery, food (particularly fish) and money, engaging with the conflict with some enthusiasm. Scotland's industries were directed at the war effort. For example, the Singer Clydebank sewing machine factory received over 5000 government contracts, and made 303 million artillery shells, shell components, fuses, and aeroplane parts, as well as grenades, rifle parts, and 361,000 horseshoes. Its labour force of 14,000 was about 70 per cent female at war's end.

With a population of 4.8 million in 1911, Scotland sent 690,000 men to the war, of whom 74,000 died in combat or from disease, and 150,000 were seriously wounded. Scottish urban centres, with their poverty and unemployment, were favourite recruiting grounds of the regular British army, and Dundee, where the female-dominated jute industry limited male employment, had one of the highest proportion of reservists and serving soldiers than almost any other British city. Concern for their families' standard of living made men hesitate to enlist; voluntary enlistment rates went up after the government guaranteed a weekly stipend for life to the survivors of men who were killed or disabled. After the introduction of conscription from January 1916 every part of the country was affected. Occasionally Scottish troops made up large proportions of the active combatants, and suffered corresponding loses, as at the Battle of Loos, where there were three full Scots divisions and other Scottish units. Thus, although Scots were only 10 per cent of the British population, they made up 15 per cent of the national armed forces and eventually accounted for 20 per cent of the dead. Some areas, like the thinly populated island of Lewis and Harris, suffered some of the highest proportional losses of any part of Britain. Clydeside shipyards and the nearby engineering shops were the major centres of war industry in Scotland. In Glasgow, radical agitation led to industrial and political unrest that continued after the war ended. After the end of the war in June 1919 the German fleet interned at Scapa Flow was scuttled by its German crews, to avoid its ships being taken over by the victorious allies.

At the start of the war, the main Scottish military airfield was RAF Montrose, established a year earlier by the Royal Flying Corps (RFC). The Royal Naval Air Service established flying-boat and seaplane stations on Shetland, at East Fortune and Inchinnan, the latter two also serving as the army's airship bases and protecting Edinburgh and Glasgow, the two largest cities. The world's first aircraft carriers were based at Rosyth Dockyard in Fife, where numerous trials were undertaken of aircraft landing on them. The Beardmore W.B.III aircraft was produced by the Glasgow–based William Beardmore and Company, and was the first Royal Navy aircraft designed for flight operations on an aircraft carrier. Due to the scale and significance of Rosyth dockyard to war efforts, it was a prime target for Germany at the outbreak of World War I.

=== Economic boom and stagnation ===
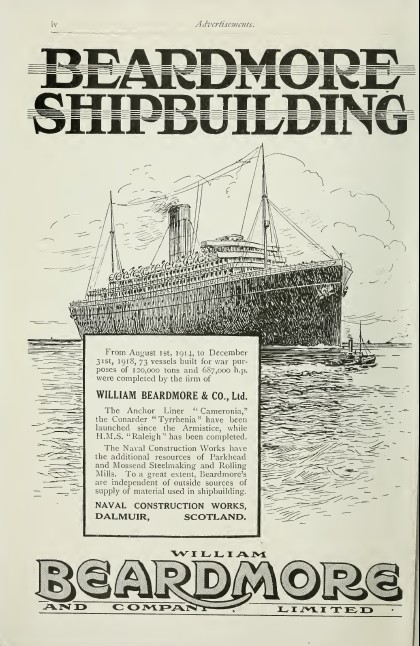
A 1923 advert for William Beardmore and Company, Clydeside, who employed 40,000 workers at its height

A boom was created by the First World War, with the shipbuilding industry expanding by a third, but a serious depression hit the economy by 1922. The most skilled craftsmen were especially hard hit, because there were few alternative uses for their specialised skills. The main social indicators such as poor health, bad housing, and long-term mass unemployment, pointed to terminal social and economic stagnation at best, or even a downward spiral. The heavy dependence on obsolescent heavy industry and mining was a central problem, and no one offered workable solutions. The despair reflected what Finlay (1994) describes as a widespread sense of hopelessness that prepared local business and political leaders to accept a new orthodoxy of centralised government economic planning when it arrived during the Second World War.

A few industries did grow, such as chemicals and whisky, which developed a global market for premium "Scotch". However, in general the Scottish economy stagnated leading to growing unemployment and political agitation among industrial workers.

=== Interwar politics ===
Following World War I the Liberal Party began to disintegrate and Labour emerged as the party of progressive politics in Scotland, gaining a solid following among working classes of the urban lowlands. As a result, the Unionists were able to gain most of the votes of the middle classes, who now feared Bolshevik revolution, setting the social and geographical electoral pattern in Scotland that would last until the late 20th century. The fear of the left had been fuelled by the emergence of a radical movement led by militant trades unionists. John MacLean emerged as a key political figure in what became known as Red Clydeside, and in January 1919, the Sheriff of Lanarkshire called for military aid for the understrength Glasgow Police in the middle of a riot during the strike for a Forty Hours working week. Formerly a Liberal stronghold, the industrial districts switched to Labour by 1922, with a base in the Irish Catholic working class districts. Women were especially active in building neighbourhood solidarity on housing and rent issues. However, the "Reds" operated within the Labour Party and had little influence in Parliament; in the face of heavy unemployment the workers' mood changed to passive despair by the late 1920s. Scottish educated Bonar Law led a Conservative government from 1922 to 1923 and another Scot, Ramsay MacDonald, would be the Labour Party's first Prime Minister in 1924 and again from 1929 to 1935.

With all the main parties committed to the Union, new nationalist and independent political groupings began to emerge, including the National Party of Scotland in 1928 and Scottish Party in 1930. They joined to form the Scottish National Party (SNP) in 1934, with the goal of creating an independent Scotland, but it enjoyed little electoral success in the Westminster system.

=== Second World War (1939–1945) ===
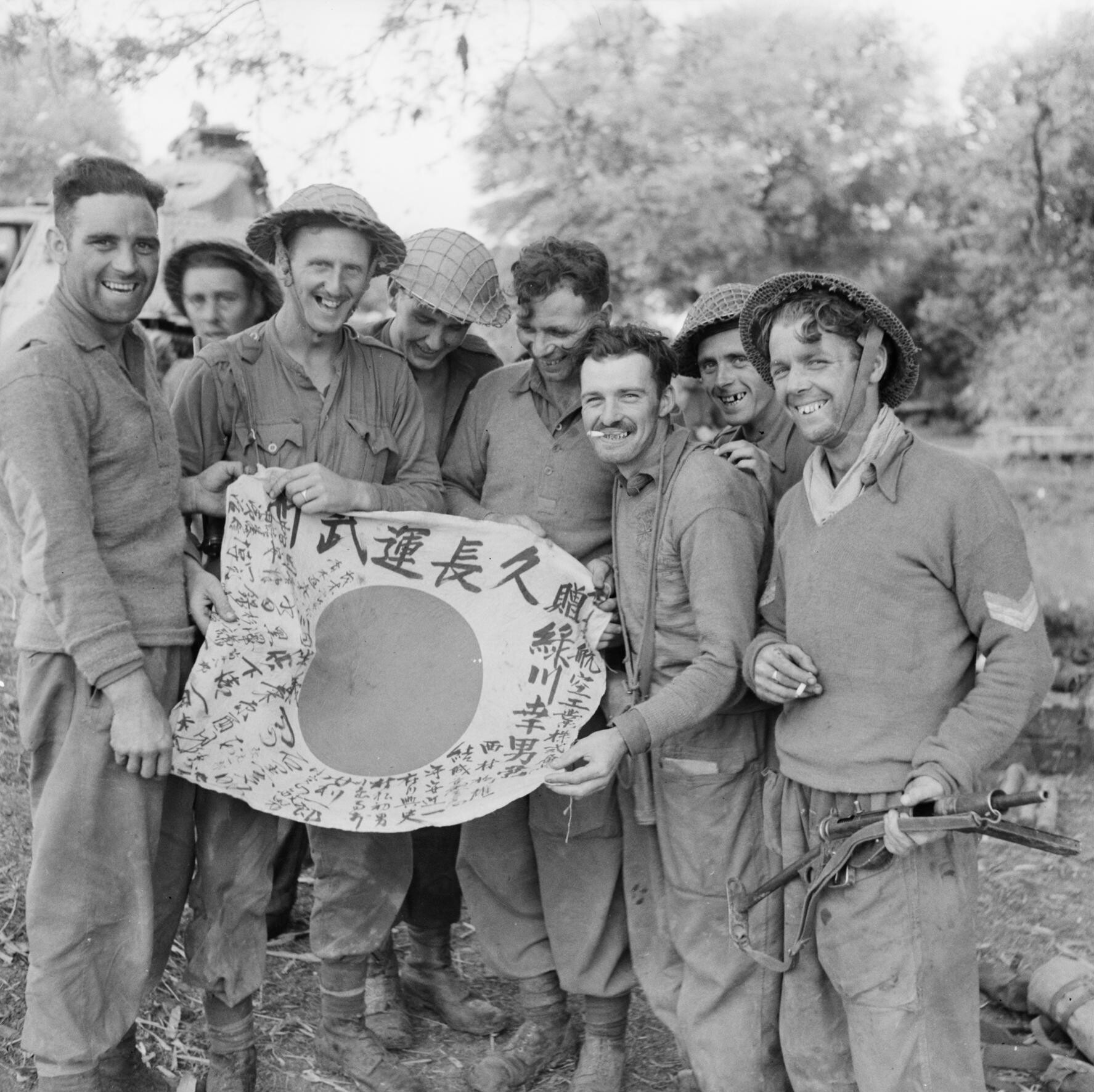
Royal Scots with captured Japanese flag, Burma, January 1945

As in World War I, Scapa Flow in Orkney served as an important Royal Navy base. Attacks on Scapa Flow and Rosyth gave RAF fighters their first successes downing bombers in the Firth of Forth and East Lothian. The shipyards and heavy engineering factories in Glasgow and Clydeside played a key part in the war effort, and suffered attacks from the Luftwaffe, enduring great destruction and loss of life. As transatlantic voyages involved negotiating north-west Britain, Scotland played a key part in the battle of the North Atlantic. Shetland's relative proximity to occupied Norway resulted in the Shetland Bus by which fishing boats helped Norwegians flee the Nazis, and expeditions across the North Sea to assist resistance. Significant individual contributions to the war effort by Scots included the invention of radar by Robert Watson-Watt, which was invaluable in the Battle of Britain, as was the leadership at RAF Fighter Command of Air Chief Marshal Hugh Dowding.

Scotland's airfields provided "a complex network of training and operational needs", with each airfield said to have had an "essential role" in war efforts. A number of squadrons located on the Ayrshire and Fife coasts were mainly used for anti-shipping patrols. Fighter squadrons on Scotland's east coat – Wick, Dyce, Peterhead, Montrose, Leuchars, Drem, East Fortune, Kinloss and Grangemouth – were Coastal Command bases, and used mainly to protect and defend the fleet of aircraft and equipment at both Rosyth Dockyard and Scapa Flow. East Fortune also served as a diversion airfield for Handley Page Halifax and Avro Lancaster bombers returning from bombing operations over Nazi Germany. A total of 94 military airfields were in operation across Scotland during World War II.

In World War II, despite extensive bombing by the Luftwaffe, Scottish industry came out of the depression slump by a dramatic expansion of its industrial activity, absorbing unemployed men and many women as well. The shipyards were the centre of more activity, but many smaller industries produced the machinery needed by the British bombers, tanks and warships. Agriculture prospered, as did all sectors except for coal mining, which was operating mines near exhaustion. Real wages, adjusted for inflation, rose 25 per cent, and unemployment temporarily vanished. Increased income, and the more equal distribution of food, obtained through a tight rationing system, dramatically improved the health and nutrition; the average height of 13-year-olds in Glasgow increased by 2 inches (51 mm).

=== End of mass emigration ===
While emigration began to tail off in England and Wales after the First World War, it continued apace in Scotland, with 400,000 Scots, ten per cent of the population, estimated to have left the country between 1921 and 1931. The economic stagnation was only one factor; other push factors included a zest for travel and adventure, and the pull factors of better job opportunities abroad, personal networks to link into, and the basic cultural similarity of the United States, Canada, and Australia. Government subsidies for travel and relocation facilitated the decision to emigrate. Personal networks of family and friends who had gone ahead and wrote back, or sent money, prompted emigrants to retrace their paths. When the Great Depression hit in the 1930s there were no easily available jobs in the US and Canada and the numbers leaving fell to less than 50,000 a year, bringing to an end the period of mass emigrations that had opened in the mid-18th century.

=== Literary renaissance ===
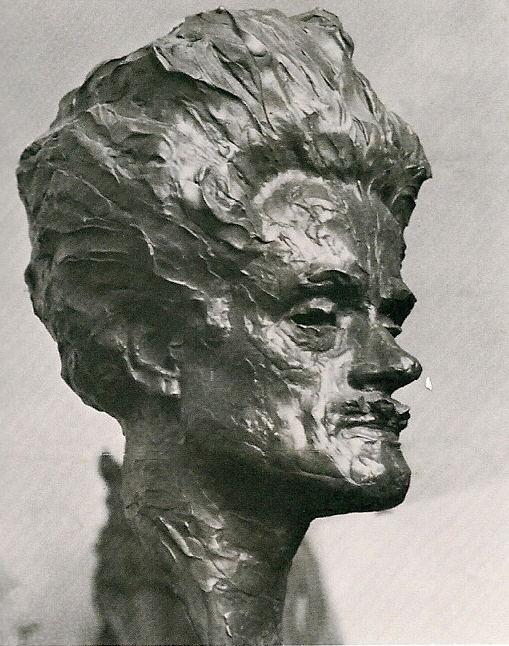
A bust of Hugh MacDiarmid sculpted by William Lamb in 1927

In the early 20th century there was a new surge of activity in Scottish literature, influenced by modernism and resurgent nationalism, known as the Scottish Renaissance. The leading figure in the movement was Hugh MacDiarmid (the pseudonym of Christopher Murray Grieve). MacDiarmid attempted to revive the Scots language as a medium for serious literature in poetic works including "A Drunk Man Looks at the Thistle" (1936), developing a form of Synthetic Scots that combined different regional dialects and archaic terms. Other writers that emerged in this period, and are often treated as part of the movement, include the poets Edwin Muir and William Soutar, the novelists Neil Gunn, George Blake, Nan Shepherd, A. J. Cronin, Naomi Mitchison, Eric Linklater and Lewis Grassic Gibbon, and the playwright James Bridie. All were born within a fifteen-year period (1887 and 1901) and, although they cannot be described as members of a single school, they all pursued an exploration of identity, rejecting nostalgia and parochialism and engaging with social and political issues.

=== Educational reorganisation and retrenchment ===
In the 20th century, the centre of the education system became more focused on Scotland, with the ministry of education partly moving north in 1918 and then finally having its headquarters relocated to Edinburgh in 1939. The school leaving age was raised to 14 in 1901, but despite attempts to raise it to 15 this was only made law in 1939 and then postponed because of the outbreak of war. In 1918, Roman Catholic schools were brought into the state system, but retained their distinct religious character, access to schools by priests and the requirement that school staff be acceptable to the Church.

The first half of the 20th century saw Scottish universities fall behind those in England and Europe in terms of participation and investment. The decline of traditional industries between the wars undermined recruitment. English universities increased the numbers of students registered between 1924 and 1927 by 19 per cent, but in Scotland the numbers fell, particularly among women. In the same period, while expenditure in English universities rose by 90 per cent, in Scotland the increase was less than a third of that figure.

=== Naval role ===
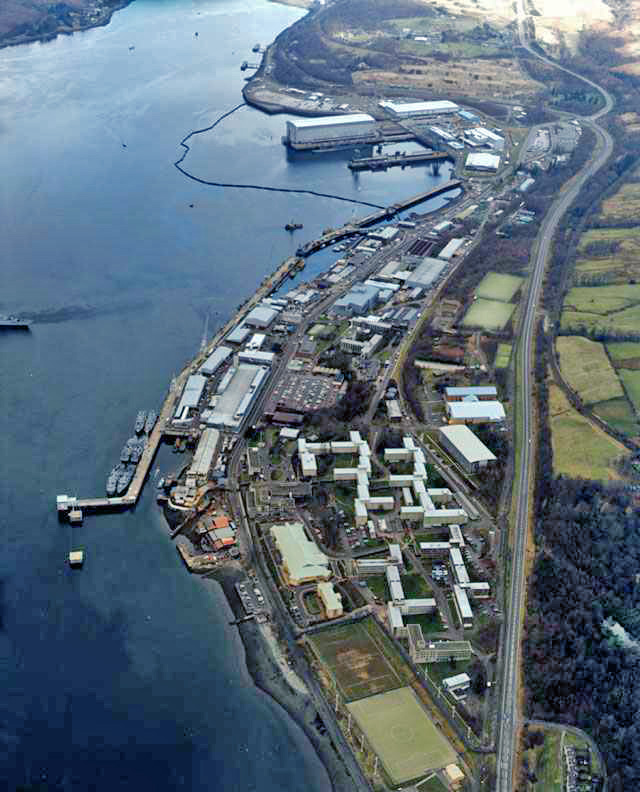
View of HMNB Clyde

Scotland's Scapa Flow was the main base for the Royal Navy in the 20th century. As the Cold War intensified in 1961, the United States deployed Polaris ballistic missiles, and submarines, in the Firth of Clyde's Holy Loch. Public protests from CND campaigners proved futile. The Royal Navy successfully convinced the government to allow the base because it wanted its own Polaris submarines, and it obtained them in 1963. The RN's nuclear submarine base opened with four Resolution-class Polaris submarines at the expanded Faslane Naval Base on the Gare Loch. The first patrol of a Trident-armed submarine occurred in 1994, although the US base was closed at the end of the Cold War.

During the outbreak of the Cold War, Scotland's secret bunker at Anstruther were largely kept a closed and guarded secret. Initially used by the Royal Air Force (RAF) after World War II as one of a number of radar stations, it became a secret bunker to be used in the event of a nuclear attack. The bunker was 40 metres in depth and was constructed using a shell encased in three-metre solid concrete in order to deflect a nuclear attack. The facility remained in use until 1992, and was later redeveloped into a museum in 1994. The nuclear facility at Dounreay in the Highland area of Scotland was one of the 52 known nuclear targets of the Soviet Union until at least 1990.

== Postwar ==
=== Overview ===
Following World War II, Scotland's economic situation became progressively worse due to overseas competition, inefficient industry, and industrial disputes. This only began to change in the 1970s, partly due to the discovery and development of North Sea oil and gas and partly as Scotland moved towards a more service-based economy, with the services sector contributing 75% to the overall Scottish economy in 2020.

This period saw the emergence of the Scottish National Party and movements for both Scottish independence and more popularly devolution. A referendum on devolution in 1979 was unsuccessful as it did not achieve the support of 40 per cent of the electorate. However, in 1997 Scottish voters voted in favour of establishing a Scottish Parliament which was established in 1998 and thus Scottish devolution was reformed. In 2014, the independence referendum saw vote against independence by 55% to 45% choosing to remain in the United Kingdom.

=== Politics and devolution ===
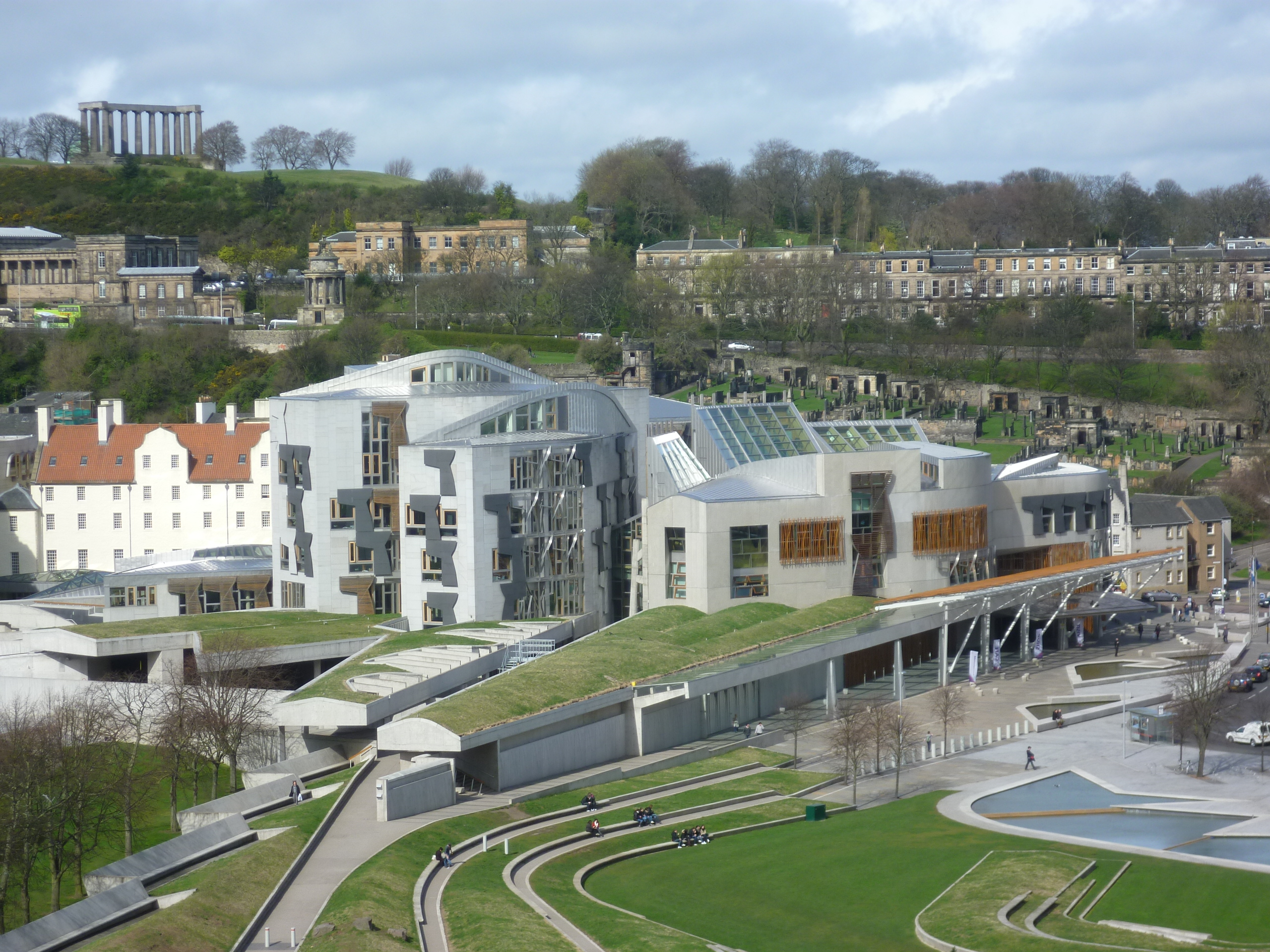
Scottish Parliament Building, Holyrood, opened in 2004 and intended to evoke the crags of the Scottish landscape and, in places, upturned fishing boats

In the second half of the 20th century the Labour Party usually won most Scottish seats in the Westminster parliament, losing this dominance briefly to the Unionists in the 1950s. Support in Scotland was critical to Labour's overall electoral fortunes as without Scottish MPs it would have gained only two UK electoral victories in the 20th century (1945 and 1966). The number of Scottish seats represented by Unionists (known as Conservatives from 1965 onwards) went into steady decline from 1959 onwards, until it fell to zero in 1997. Politicians with Scottish connections continued to play a prominent part in UK political life, with Prime Ministers including the Conservatives Harold Macmillan (whose father was Scottish) from 1957 to 1963 and Alec Douglas-Home from 1963 to 1964.

The Scottish National Party gained its first seat at Westminster in 1945 and became a party of national prominence during the 1970s, achieving 11 MPs in 1974. However, a referendum on devolution in 1979 was unsuccessful as it did not achieve the necessary support of 40 per cent of the electorate (despite a small majority of those who voted supporting the proposal) and the SNP went into electoral decline during the 1980s. The introduction in 1989 by the Thatcher-led Conservative government of the Community Charge (widely known as the Poll Tax), one year before the rest of the United Kingdom, contributed to a growing movement for a return to direct Scottish control over domestic affairs. On 11 September 1997, the 700th anniversary of Battle of Stirling Bridge, the Blair led Labour government again held a referendum on the issue of devolution which led to the establishment of a devolved Scottish Parliament in 1999. A coalition government, which would last until 2007, was formed between Labour and the Liberal Democrats, with Donald Dewar as First Minister until his death in 2000.

The new Scottish Parliament Building, adjacent to Holyrood House in Edinburgh, opened in 2004. Although not initially reaching its 1970s peak in Westminster elections, the SNP had more success in the Scottish Parliamentary elections with their system of mixed member proportional representation. It became the largest opposition party in 1999, a minority government in 2007 and a majority government in 2011. A national referendum to decide on Scottish independence was held on 18 September 2014. Voters were asked to answer either "Yes" or "No" to the question: "Should Scotland be an independent country?" 55.3% of voters answered "No" and 44.7% answered "Yes", with a voter turnout of 84.5%. In the 2015 Westminster election, the SNP won 56 out of 59 Scottish seats, making them the third largest party in Westminster.

=== Economic reorientation ===
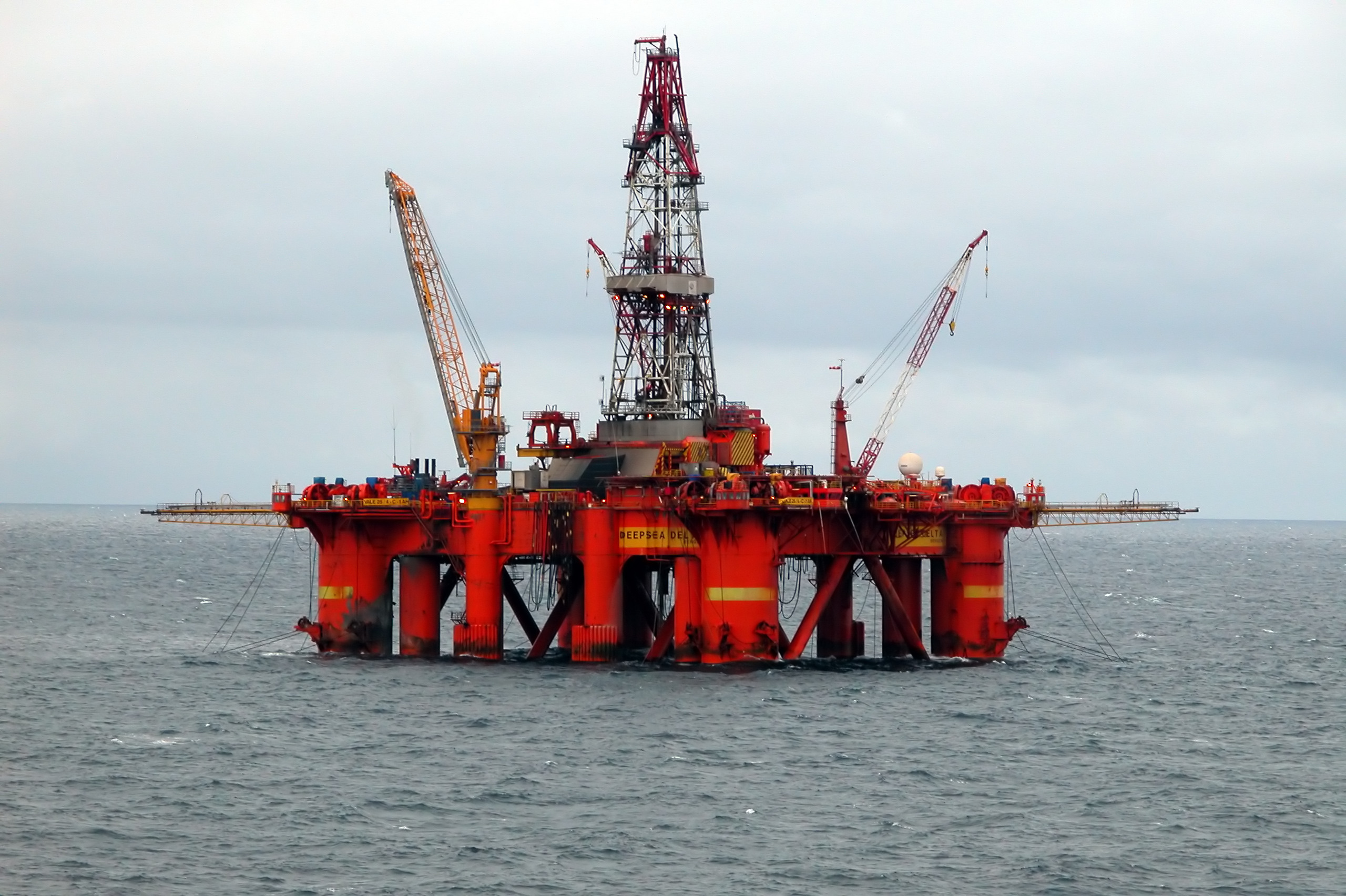
A drilling rig located in the North Sea

Following World War II, Scotland's economic situation became progressively worse due to overseas competition, inefficient industry, and industrial disputes. This only began to change in the 1970s, partly due to the discovery and development of North Sea oil and gas and partly as Scotland moved towards a more service-based economy. The discovery of the giant Forties oilfield in October 1970 signalled that Scotland was about to become a major oil producing nation, a view confirmed when Shell Expro discovered the giant Brent oilfield in the northern North Sea east of Shetland in 1971. Oil production started from the Argyll field (now Ardmore) in June 1975, followed by Forties in November of that year. Deindustrialisation took place rapidly in the 1970s and 1980s, as most of the traditional industries drastically shrank or were completely closed down. A new service-oriented economy emerged to replace traditional heavy industries. This included a resurgent financial services industry and the electronics manufacturing of Silicon Glen.

=== Religious diversity and decline ===
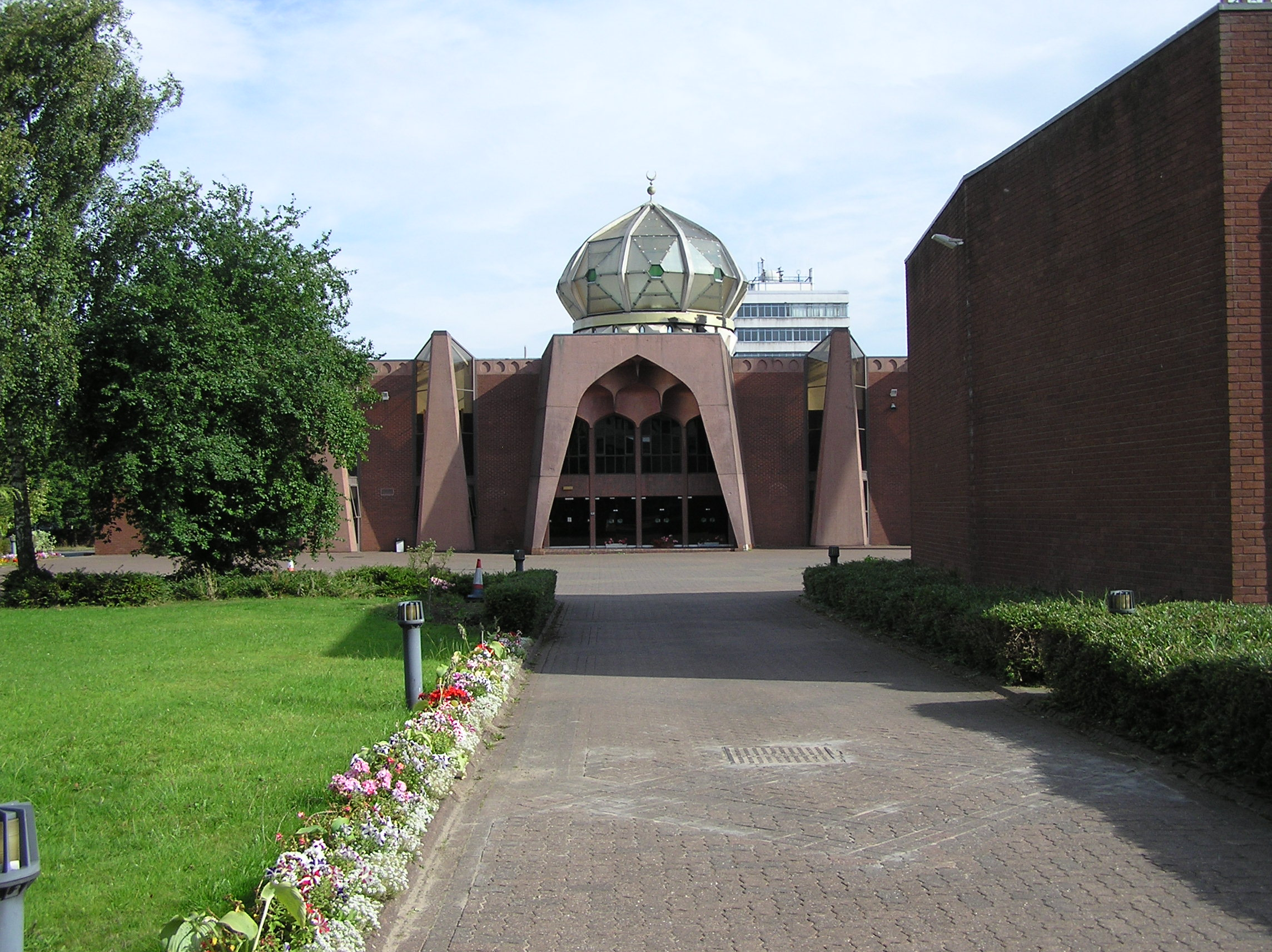
Glasgow Central Mosque, the largest mosque in Scotland

In the 20th century existing Christian denominations were joined by other organisations, including the Brethren and Pentecostal churches. Although some denominations thrived, after World War II there was a steady overall decline in church attendance and resulting church closures for most denominations. Talks began in the 1950s aiming at a grand merger of the main Presbyterian, Episcopal and Methodist bodies in Scotland. The talks were ended in 2003, when the General Assembly of the Church of Scotland rejected the proposals. In the 2011 census, 53.8% of the Scottish population identified as Christian (declining from 65.1% in 2001). The Church of Scotland is the largest religious grouping in Scotland, with 32.4% of the population. The Roman Catholic Church accounted for 15.9% of the population and is especially important in West Central Scotland and the Highlands. In recent years other religions have established a presence in Scotland, mainly through immigration and higher birth rates among ethnic minorities, with a small number of converts. Those with the most adherents in the 2011 census are Islam (1.4%, mainly among immigrants from South Asia), Hinduism (0.3%), Buddhism (0.2%) and Sikhism (0.2%). Other minority faiths include the Bahá'í Faith and small Neopagan groups. There are also various organisations which actively promote humanism and secularism, included within the 43.6% who either indicated no religion or did not state a religion in the 2011 census.

=== Educational reforms ===
Although plans to raise the school leaving age to 15 in the 1940s were never ratified, increasing numbers stayed on beyond elementary education and it was eventually raised to 16 in 1973. As a result, secondary education was the major area of growth in the second half of the 20th century. New qualifications were developed to cope with changing aspirations and economics, with the Leaving Certificate being replaced by the Scottish Certificate of Education Ordinary Grade ('O-Grade') and Higher Grade ('Higher') qualifications in 1962, which became the basic entry qualification for university study. The higher education sector expanded in the second half of the 20th century, with four institutions being given university status in the 1960s (Dundee, Heriot-Watt, Stirling and Strathclyde) and five in the 1990s (Abertay, Glasgow Caledonian, Napier, Paisley and Robert Gordon). After devolution, in 1999 the new Scottish Executive set up an Education Department and an Enterprise, Transport and Lifelong Learning Department. One of the major diversions from practice in England, possible because of devolution, was the abolition of student tuition fees in 1999, instead retaining a system of means-tested student grants.

=== New literature ===
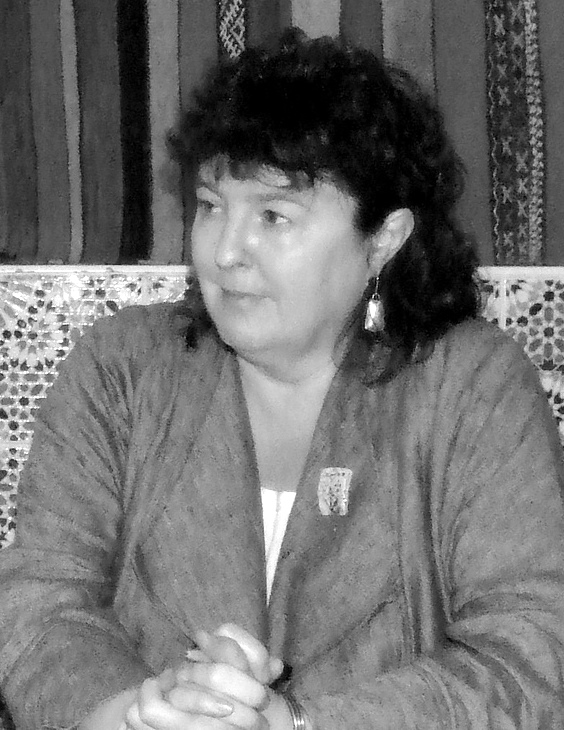
Carol Ann Duffy the first Scottish Poet Laureate

Some writers that emerged after the Second World War followed Hugh MacDiarmid by writing in Scots, including Robert Garioch and Sydney Goodsir Smith. Others demonstrated a greater interest in English language poetry, among them Norman MacCaig, George Bruce and Maurice Lindsay. George Mackay Brown from Orkney, and Iain Crichton Smith from Lewis, wrote both poetry and prose fiction shaped by their distinctive island backgrounds. The Glaswegian poet Edwin Morgan became known for translations of works from a wide range of European languages. He was also the first Scots Makar (the official national poet), appointed by the inaugural Scottish government in 2004.

Many major Scottish post-war novelists, such as Muriel Spark, with The Prime of Miss Jean Brodie (1961) spent much or most of their lives outside Scotland, but often dealt with Scottish themes. Successful mass-market works included the action novels of Alistair MacLean, and the historical fiction of Dorothy Dunnett. A younger generation of novelists that emerged in the 1960s and 1970s included Shena Mackay, Alan Spence, Allan Massie and the work of William McIlvanney. From the 1980s Scottish literature enjoyed another major revival, this time led by a group of Glasgow writers associated with critic, poet and teacher Philip Hobsbaum and editor Peter Kravitz.

In the 1990s major, prize winning Scottish novels, often overtly political, that emerged from this movement included Irvine Welsh's Trainspotting (1993), Warner's Morvern Callar (1995), Gray's Poor Things (1992) and Kelman's How Late It Was, How Late (1994). Scottish crime fiction has been a major area of growth, particularly the success of Edinburgh's Ian Rankin and his Inspector Rebus novels. This period also saw the emergence of a new generation of Scottish poets that became leading figures on the UK stage, including Carol Ann Duffy, who was named as Poet Laureate in May 2009, the first woman, the first Scot and the first openly gay poet to take the post.

== See also ==
- Economic history of Scotland
- History of the Outer Hebrides
- Historic Sites in Scotland
- History of the United Kingdom
- Kings of Scotland
- List of years in Scotland
- Scottish clan
- Scottish society
- Timeline of Scottish history
