= A Rabelaisian Fragment =

1759 unfinished manuscript by Laurence Sterne

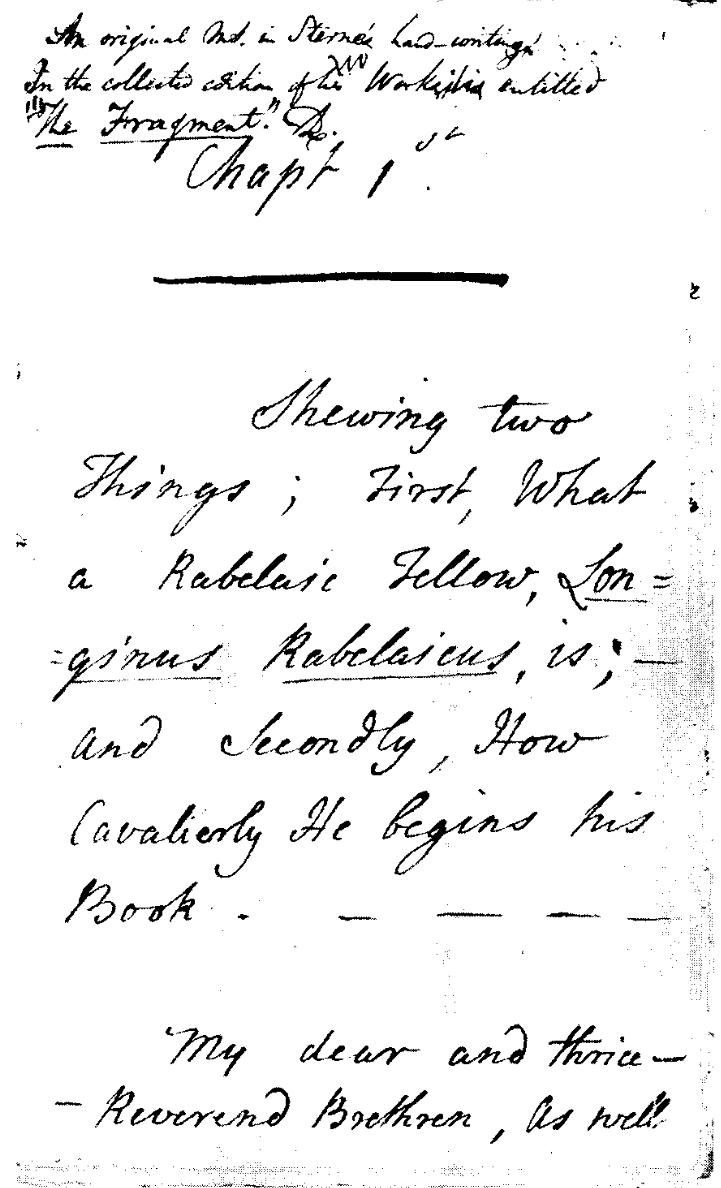
The first page of Sterne's Rabelaisian Fragment

"A Rabelaisian Fragment", also known as the "Fragment in the Manner of Rabelais", is an unfinished satirical work by Laurence Sterne. It was most likely composed in 1759, between his minor pamphlet A Political Romance and his highly popular Tristram Shandy. It represents his first attempt at long-form comic fiction after a long career as a rural Anglican clergyman. Its two chapters depict a debate among clergymen in vulgar language, and another clergyman who panics while plagiarizing a sermon. A bowdlerized version of the fragment was published posthumously by Sterne's daughter Lydia in 1775; this was the only version to be reprinted until 1972, when the scholar Melvyn New published an edited critical edition based on the original manuscript. Stylistically, it is influenced by the irreligious and bawdy satire of François Rabelais and Jonathan Swift.

== Synopsis ==
Longinus Rabelaicus (Note: This character's name references both Pseudo-Longinus and Rabelais.) proposes creating a comprehensive manual called the Kerukopaedia (Note: Kerukopaedia is Sterne's coinage from the Greek κήρυγμα (kerygma), meaning "preaching" or "sermon," combined with the suffix "-paedia" (as in encyclopedia), meaning education or instruction.) that would compile all the rules for writing sermons into one systematic guide. His companions Panurge, Epistemon, Gymnast, and Triboulet interrupt with objections, jokes, and debate about whether this should be a guide for writing sermons or preaching them.

The clergyman Homenas (who shares a name with a bishop in Rabelais's Gargantua and Pantagruel) is in the next room plagiarizing his Sunday sermon from Dr. Samuel Clarke's published works. Homenas becomes anxious; he imagines himself falling from a high pulpit, defecating himself, and dying. His anxiety triggers a long crying fit, which improves his rhetoric by cooling his overheated style. Throughout Homenas's breakdown, the scholars in the adjoining room overhear everything. Panurge, who had been about to respond to Longinus Rabelaicus, remains frozen with his mouth open.

== Composition and publication ==
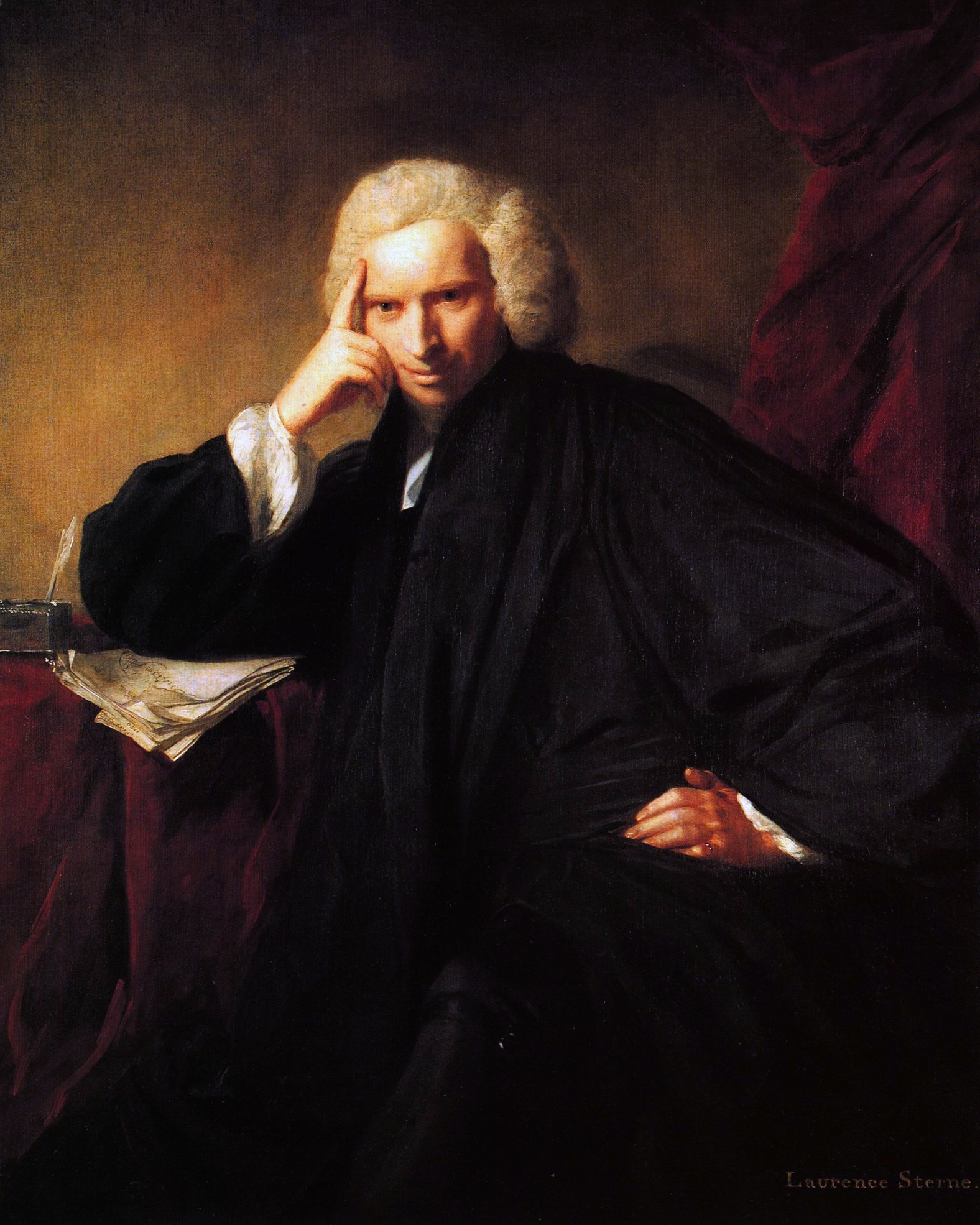
Portrait of Laurence Sterne, painted by Joshua Reynolds in 1760

According to the literary historian Melvyn New, Sterne wrote the "Fragment" in January or February 1759, after his pamphlet A Political Romance had inspired him to take up humour writing but before he had composed much of Tristram Shandy, the novel which would soon make him famous. This was a period of career transition for Sterne, who had spent the preceding decades as an Anglican clergyman in the small rural parish of Sutton-on-the-Forest.

The "Fragment" is a manuscript with twenty-three leaves. (Note: It is now held by The Morgan Library & Museum, where it has the shelfmark MA 1011.) Sterne did not give the fragment a title, but did label its two sections as "Chapt. 1st" and "Chap. 2d". It features substantial edits and corrections by Sterne, suggesting it was a rough draft. For example, Sterne changed his mind multiple times about the priest whom Homenas copies: in the first revision, it is John Rogers (with a double entendre on Homenas "Rogering" his sermons); Rogers is crossed out and replaced with John Norris; Norris is then replaced with Clarke. According to a contemporary report, it originally included an allegorical satire about competing interpretations of the biblical Book of Job, inspired by the Memoirs of Martinus Scriblerus by the Scriblerus Club. However, this debate about Job is not present in the extant fragment. The last sentence of the fragment implies that the story was intended to continue, stating, "They plainly and distinctly heard every Syllable of what you will find recorded in the very next Chapter."

A bowdlerized version of the fragment was published posthumously by Sterne's daughter Lydia Medalle in 1775 as part of a larger collection of his writing. She listed it on the title page as "A Fragment in the Manner of Rabelais". Her revisions include removing the word "shit" and changing the phrase "I know no more of Greek & Latin than my Arse" to "I know no more of Latin than my horse".

Medalle's was the only version to be reprinted until 1972, when the scholar Melvyn New published an edited critical edition based on the original manuscript. New and W.B. Gerard published a second critical edition in 2014, as part of their Florida Edition of the Works of Laurence Sterne. The 1972 version presents a partly normalized text with footnotes identifying Sterne's major edits, while the 2014 edition presents two versions: a recreation of the manuscript's many idiosyncrasies, and a polished text edited for readability.

== Style and influences ==
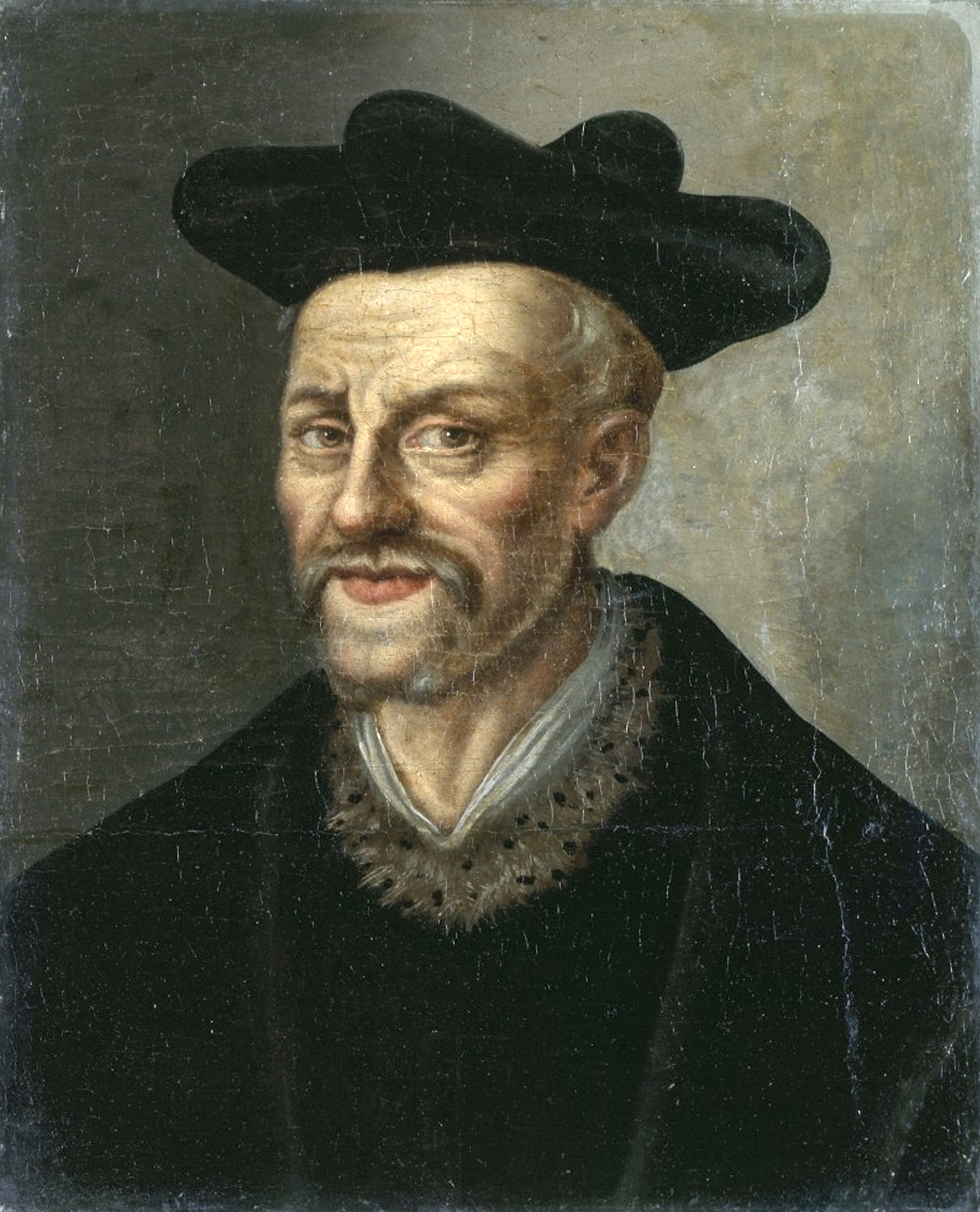
François Rabelais (born between 1483 and 1494; died 1553), painted after his death

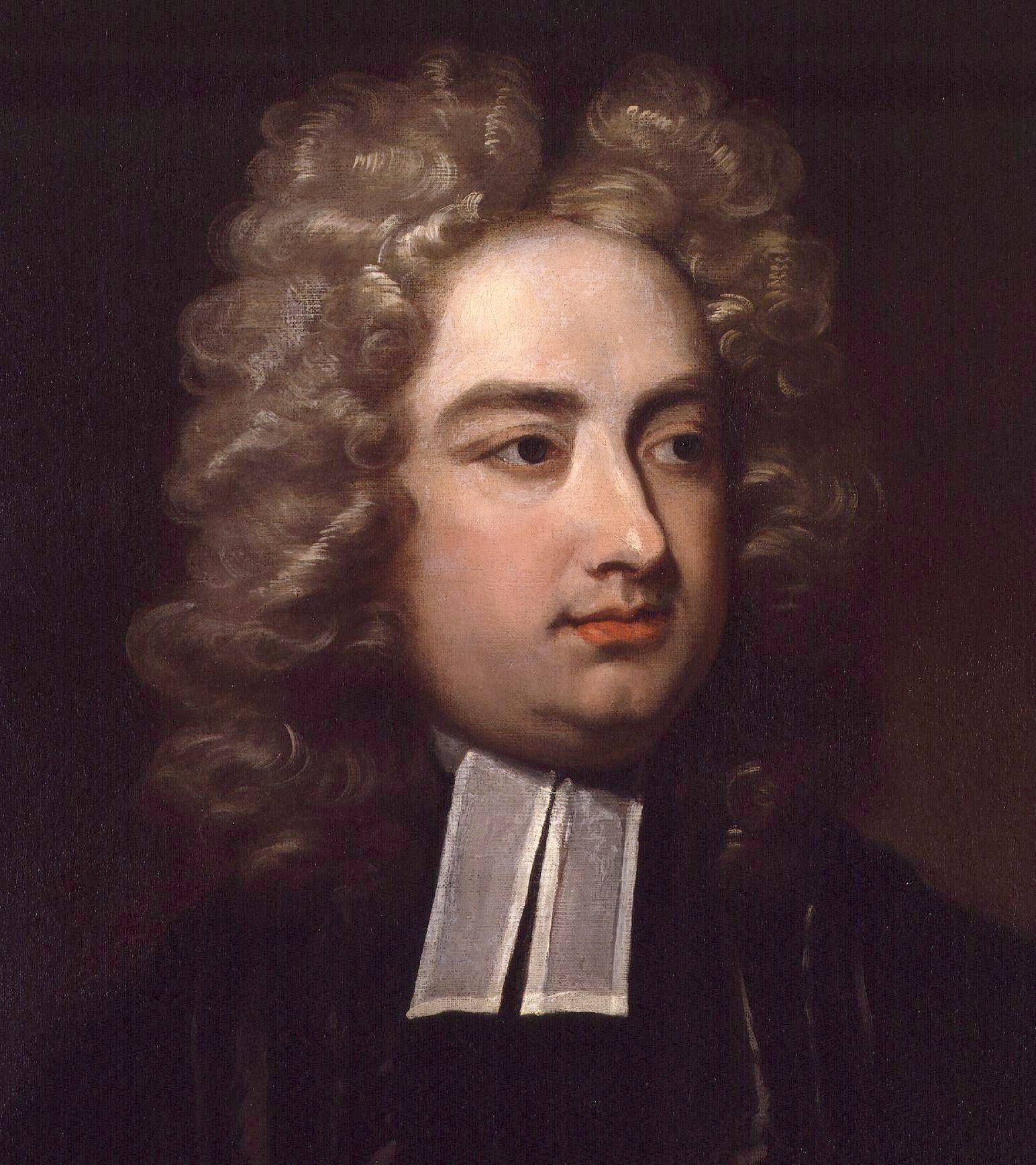
Jonathan Swift (1667 – 1745), painted 1718

In the fragment, Sterne's primary satiric influence is François Rabelais, by way of Jonathan Swift. Rabelais was a sixteenth-century French priest and satirist originally known for his humanist learned wit, whose reputation in the eighteenth century emphasized drinking, atheism, and libertinism. Swift was also a satirist and a cleric. According to the literary scholar Marcus Walsh, both Swift and Sterne "are indebted to the extravagance, the invention, and the indecency of Rabelais." In keeping with this tradition, Sterne's fragment treats the church without solemnity, and several times uses "shit" as an expletive and a literal referent. Walsh calls Sterne's description of Homenas's plagiarism "inventively obscene". Sterne follows Rabelais's model with extensive comic lists, such as "all kinds of your theological, hebdomadical, rostrummical, humdrummical what d'ye 'call ems" and absurd numerical precision, such as Homenas's plagiarism of "Five whole Pages, nine round Paragraphs, and a Dozen and a half of good Thoughts". Rabelais, Swift, and Sterne also share a digressive and episodic narrative structure, which Walsh compares to shaggy dog stories as opposed to comedies or tragedies whose plots drive toward a focused ending. Sterne was later sometimes called "the English Rabelais".

Despite Sterne's implicit critique of plagiarism in the fragment, his own writing relies heavily on literary echoes, allusions, and quotations. The fragment is centrally concerned with the boundary between borrowing and theft. Sterne's depiction of Homenas may have been a self-mockery, given his own practice of re-using others' writing to create his sermons — including Homenas's victim Samuel Clarke. Some of his Rabelaisian language is specifically taken from the seventeenth-century translation by Thomas Urquhart and Peter Motteux (1653–94). The first revision of the manuscript re-used an irreverent joke that Swift had been publicly criticized for telling; Sterne crossed it out, evidently deeming it too risqué. (Note: The story goes that Swift, on first arriving in Laracor as the new rector, had no one attend his first service but his clerk Roger. He delivered a full service anyway, and instead of beginning the prayer with "Dearly beloved brethren" he said "Dearly beloved Roger". This anecdote was reported in John Boyle's biography of Swift in 1751, and Swift was criticized for irreverence. Originally, Sterne also used the line "Dearly beloved Roger" in his "Fragment", but it is crossed out.) Other borrowings from Swift include a parallel to A Tale of a Tub in the description of Homenas's crying fit.

As an additional influence, Sterne's jokes at the expense of the Kerukopaedia suggest that its contents would have been a parody of Longinus's Peri Hupsous (On the Sublime), previously parodied in Alexander Pope's "Peri Bathous, Or the Art of Sinking in Poetry". Sterne was also inspired by the priest François Béroalde de Verville, whose Le Moyen de Parvenir has been described as "facetiously indecent". The literary critics Melvyn New and W.B. Gerard argue that the "Fragment" reveals that the older authors of Pope, Swift, Rabelais, and Cervantes were Sterne's primary influences, rather than his closer contemporaries Henry Fielding and Samuel Richardson, both of whom were popular novelists in the mid-eighteenth century.

== Relationship to Tristram Shandy ==
The "Fragment" is generally seen as an early draft or prototype for Sterne's first novel, Tristram Shandy, which he published later the same year. Sterne's biographer Ian Campbell Ross describes the "Fragment" as a "transitional state" between A Political Romance and Tristram Shandy, being "both freer and bawdier than the closely woven allegory of the Romance, yet still remaining in essence a prose satire" as opposed to a novel. Sterne sent an in-progress work to the publisher Robert Dodsley in May 1759, and on Dodsley's advice he changed his writing approach to broaden the targets of his humour, reduce his bawdiness, and make more references to popular contemporary fiction. Ross describes the resulting first volumes of Tristram Shandy as "more up-to-date and accessible and hence—the crucial point for Sterne—more marketable" than the work implied by the two chapters of the "Fragment".

Some paragraphs from the fragment appear in volumes I, II, and IV of Tristram Shandy with minor changes, and are crossed out in the manuscript. The literary historians Melvyn New and W.B. Gerard propose the following writing process: "He seems ... to have kept the pages in his study, perhaps looking for an opportune moment to discuss pulpit oratory; the occasion would arise only with the Visitation dinner in volume IV, but after borrowing several short passages for that scene, he appears to have finally abandoned the idea."
