= Hafen Slawkenbergius =

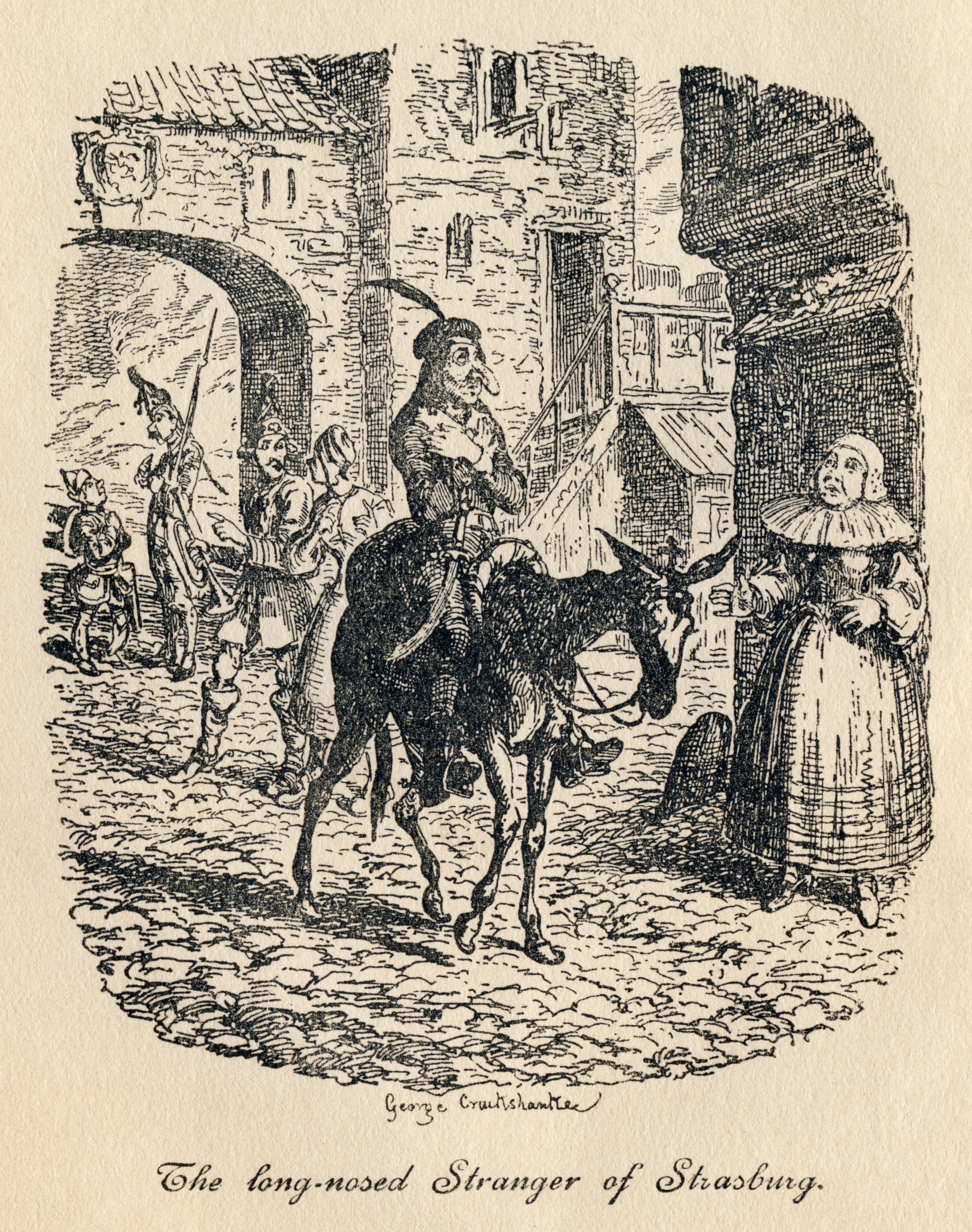
George Cruikshank's illustration of Diego, a character written about by Slawkenbergius in Tristram Shandy

Hafen Slawkenbergius is a fictional writer referenced in Laurence Sterne's novel Tristram Shandy. Slawkenbergius was "distinguished by the length of his nose, and a great authority on the subject of noses".

Sterne gives few biographical details relating to Slawkenbergius, but states that he was German, and that he had died over 90 years prior to the writing and publication (in 1761) of the books of Tristram Shandy in which he appears — i.e., circa 1670, although Slawkenbergius' tale includes a reference to the French annexation of Strasbourg in 1681. Slawkenbergius is primarily known for his scholarly writings in Neo-Latin, particularly his lengthy monograph De Nasis ("On Noses"), purporting to explain different types of noses and their corresponding significance to human character. The second book of De Nasis is said to be filled with a large number of short stories illustrative of Slawkenbergius' characterizations of noses. Only one of these stories is reproduced in Tristram Shandy, partially in its (supposedly) original Latin, but primarily in English "translation" (a comparison of the Latin and English shows the English "translation" to be rather free; or rather, the Latin is to be regarded as a partial condensation and simplification of the English).

Slawkenbergius is first referred to in Vol. III Ch. XXXV. Vol. IV opens with the relatively lengthy "Slawkenbergius's Tale". This tale recounts the journey of a courteous gentleman, Diego, who was endowed with a massive nose. Diego attempts to pass inconspicuously through Strasburg (Ger.; Fr., Strasbourg) on his way from the "Promontory of Noses", but the sight of his giant nose sends the Strasburgers, especially the nuns, into a restless frenzy. The tale relays the results of the upset in Strasburg and the travels of Diego to his admirer Julia. Sterne's style of Slawkenbergius's Tale mimics that of Cervantes' Don Quixote.

Slawkenbergius' name may be derived from colloquial German Hafen ("chamber pot") and Schlackenberg ("manure heap"), the latter Latinized as was common among early modern scholars.

He is mentioned in George Augustus Sala's book Twice Round the Clock; or, The Hours of the Day and Night in London (1859). Sala talks of "briefless barristers" who "walk down Parliament Street arm-in-arm" and have "bold noses of the approved Slawkenbergius pattern".
