= Ann Ward (printer) =

British printer (c. 1715–1789)

Ann Ward (1715/16 – 10 April 1789) was a British printer and business owner. She inherited her business from her husband, Caesar Ward, in 1759 and printed both the York Courant newspaper and a number of books. The Wards printed several early publications by Laurence Sterne, and Ann Ward is best remembered as the printer for the first edition of Sterne's bestselling novel Tristram Shandy. Across her career, Ward printed nearly a hundred titles, including guidebooks and histories for her city of York.

== Early life ==
Little is known about Ward's early life, save that she married a York printer, Caesar Ward, around 1738. Caesar and his brother-in-law Richard Chandler bought the York Courant newspaper in 1739. After their mismanagement, in 1744 Chandler committed suicide and Caesar Ward was declared bankrupt. When Caesar died in 1759, the paper passed to Ann Ward and she continued to run it until her death in 1789. In York, the Wards owned a book shop above the Black Swan pub in Coney Street and the printers were based off Coney Street in a former bagnio in Leopard's Yard. Ward worked with the printer David Russell, who became a part-owner of the business but his name did not appear on publications. Ward bought back Russel's share in the company in 1787 so she could pass the whole business to her son-in-law.

== Printer ==
As a printer, Ward is best known for her role in the publication of the first edition of Laurence Sterne's The Life and Opinions of Tristram Shandy, Gentleman in 1759. Sterne had originally approached Robert Dodsley in London to print the book, but after a disagreement he took it to Ward in York. "The Book shall be printed here", Sterne wrote to Dodsley in October 1759. Sterne was familiar with Ward because her husband had previously printed his sermons and his 1759 pamphlet A Political Romance.

Ward also printed other important publications. The first guide book to the city of York was printed by Ward in 1787. It was a 32-page volume detailing York's public buildings and a directory of principal merchants and tradespeople in the city. Ward issued a two volume history of York Minster detailing the site and its clergy based on the 1737 Eboracum by Francis Drake. In 1779 she published a book of poems by William Mason. The English Short Title Catalogue records almost a hundred titles printed by Ann Ward.

== Personal life and death ==
Ward had at least eight children. Her daughter Mary (baptized 27 June 1740) married George Peacock, who inherited the York printing business. Her son Caesar (baptized 4 December 1741) was part of the Stationers Company until 1763 and then established his own printing business in London. Ward died on 10 April 1789.
