= Ignatius Sancho's correspondence with Laurence Sterne =

In the 1760s, a brief exchange of letters between Ignatius Sancho and Laurence Sterne became a widely-publicized part of ongoing public debates about the abolition of slavery in the United Kingdom.

In 1766, at the height of the debate about slavery in Britain, Ignatius Sancho wrote a letter to the popular author Laurence Sterne, encouraging the writer to use his pen to lobby for the abolition of the slave trade. Sancho wrote: "That subject, handled in your striking manner, would ease the yoke (perhaps) of many—but if only one—Gracious God!—what a feast to a benevolent heart!".

Sterne's widely publicised 27 July 1766 response to Sancho's letter became an integral part of 18th-century abolitionist literature.

There is a strange coincidence, Sancho, in the little events (as well as in the great ones) of this world: for I had been writing a tender tale of the sorrows of a friendless poor negro-girl, and my eyes had scarce done smarting with it, when your letter of recommendation in behalf of so many of her brethren and sisters, came to me—but why her brethren?—or yours, Sancho! any more than mine? It is by the finest tints, and most insensible gradations, that nature descends from the fairest face about St James's, to the sootiest complexion in Africa: at which tint of these, is it, that the ties of blood are to cease? and how many shades must we descend lower still in the scale, ere mercy is to vanish with them?—but 'tis no uncommon thing, my good Sancho, for one half of the world to use the other half of it like brutes, & then endeavor to make 'em so.

This "tender tale" was published in Book IX of Tristram Shandy, chapter VI.
