= A Political Romance =

1759 pamphlet by Laurence Sterne

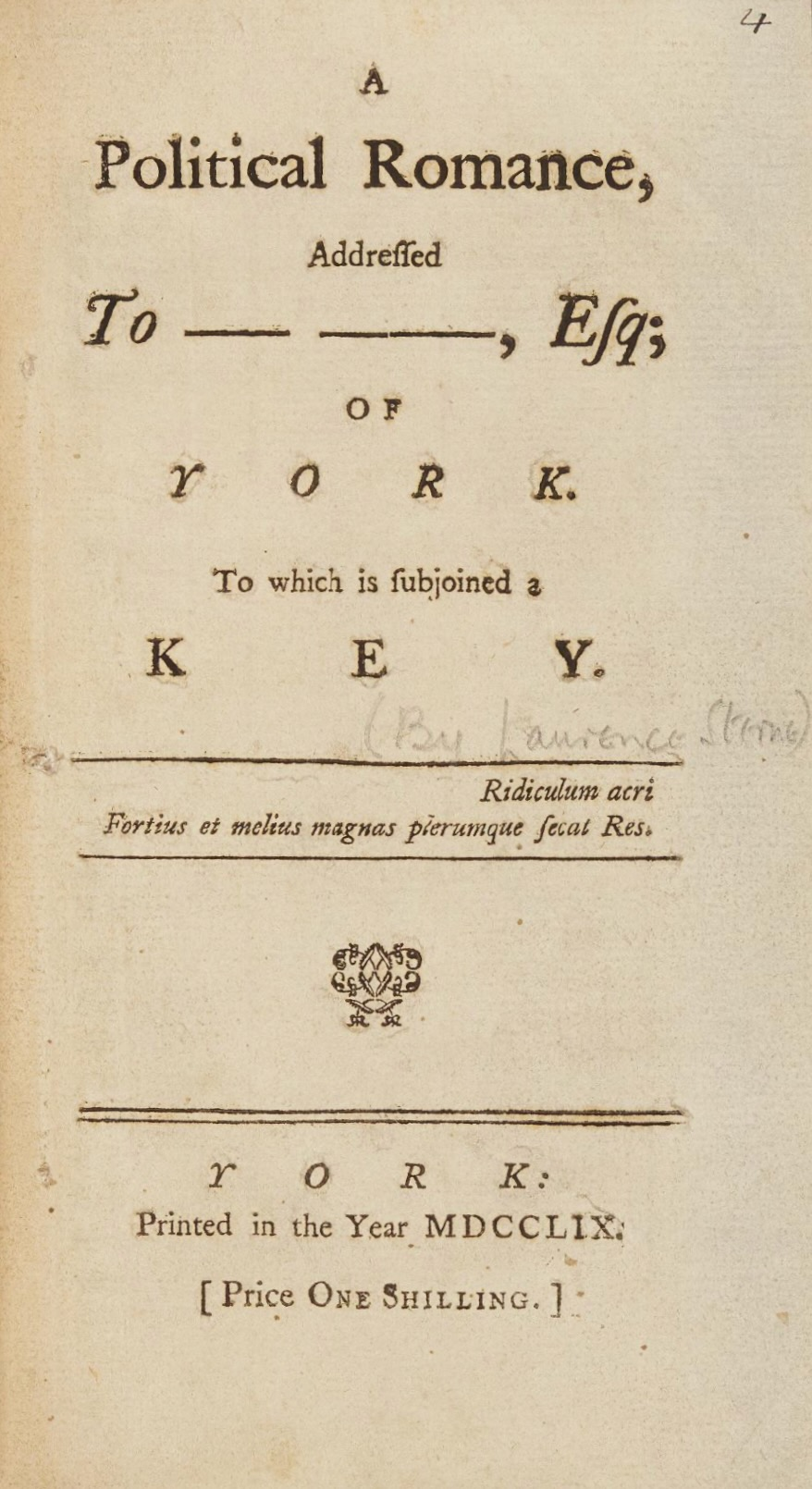
- Author: Laurence Sterne
- Genre: satire
- Published: 1759
- Pages: 60

A Political Romance is a satirical pamphlet by Laurence Sterne, first published in 1759. The story is an allegory, translating the jockeying for paid appointments within the Church of England into a squabble for used clothing within a small country parish. Stylistically, it is influenced by the satirists Jonathan Swift and Alexander Pope.

Sterne wrote the pamphlet in an attempt to improve his career as a clergyman in the Church of England. Sterne's patron John Fountayne had an ongoing rivalry with another ecclesiastical figure, Francis Topham; in 1758, Topham began a pamphlet war airing some of his longstanding grievances. Sterne's A Political Romance was the fourth and final pamphlet in the debate. It harshly mocks Topham, supporting Fountayne's version of events. After the allegorical narrative, the work includes an equally-satirical key, and two letters by Sterne. The pamphlet was suppressed soon after publication: the Archbishop of York considered it embarrassing, and requested Sterne to burn all available copies. He did so, keeping only his original manuscript; until 1905, it was believed that all original printed copies were lost, and only six accidental survivors are now known.

Despite the poor reception of the pamphlet, it provided a crucial turning point in Sterne's career. The short satire was his first work of fiction; having discovered his talent for humour writing at the age of 46, he dedicated the rest of his life to it. His highly successful serial novel, Tristram Shandy (1759–67), began to appear within the year.

== Background ==
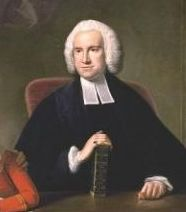
John Fountayne, the Dean of York. Sterne wrote A Political Romance with the goal of currying favour from Fountayne.

=== Church politics ===
At the time of writing, Sterne was an Anglican clergyman in Sutton-on-the-Forest, North Yorkshire, hoping to gain a better position from John Fountayne, the Dean of York.Fountayne was a college acquaintance of Sterne's; when Fountayne was appointed as Dean in 1747, Sterne looked to him for patronage. Among other favours for Fountayne, Sterne maintained copies of all of Fountayne's correspondence with an ambitious ecclesiastical lawyer, Francis Topham, documenting their bitter rivalry. (Note: For various reasons, Fountayne was also allied with William Herring (cousin of the archbishop Thomas Herring), and Topham was also allied with the archbishop Matthew Hutton and with Sterne's uncle, Jacques Sterne, whose former patronage Sterne had lost in 1742.) Topham felt that Fountayne unfairly overlooked him when granting the land patent for Pocklington and Pickering, which Fountayne gave to a Dr. Braithwaite and then (in 1751) to Sterne. (Note: The value of this post was the subject of dispute: Topham claimed that it provided an income of roughly ten pounds a year; Fountayne said the profits were half that, at five guineas a year.) Topham spread a rumour that Fountayne had promised him the post and betrayed his word, prompting Fountayne and Sterne to denounce Topham's version of events at a public dinner. Other grievances included a disagreement about a temporary preacher to be appointed at York Minster, and another minor post that Fountayne granted to a William Stables rather than to Topham. In 1758, Topham wanted John Gilbert (the new Archbishop of York) to grant him a prestigious post permanently, removing the ability for future archbishops to redistribute the post. Fountayne opposed Topham and the post was not granted, spurring Topham to lash out publicly in what became a small pamphlet war. Although the pamphlets primarily address the decade-old conflict about Pocklington and Pickering, Sterne's A Political Romance firmly argues that Topham's motivation was the more recent snub from the archbishop.

The first pamphlet published about the conflict was Topham's, published 11 December 1758. Its full title was A Letter Address'd to the Reverend the Dean of York; In which is given, A full Detail of some very extraordinary Behavior of his, in relation to his Denial of a Promise made by him to Dr. Topham (1758). This 24-page open letter criticizes Fountayne both for granting the Pocklington and Pickering patent to someone else, and for claiming in public that he had never promised it to Topham. It also mentions a range of unrelated conflicts between the two. It was followed two weeks later by Fountayne's reply, An Answer to a Letter Address'd to the Dean of York, in the Name of Dr. Topham (1758). Fountayne's 35-page pamphlet reproduces several letters from Topham, in which Topham agreed to allow someone else to receive the patent; Fountayne explains that he did not consider himself under any further obligation to Topham. Fountayne also quotes letters of support from many of his acquaintances, and includes a signed statement from Sterne describing the dinner where he and Fountayne publicly denounced Topham as a liar. At this point, both pamphlets were widely read in York, and a number of broadsides were printed mocking the participants. Topham responded with A Reply to the Answer to a Letter, Lately addressed to the Dean of York (1759), a 54-page rebuttal which also quotes letters and messages from supporters, which was published no earlier than 13 January 1759. Sterne's A Political Romance, completed a week later, was the fourth and final pamphlet. It was intended to advance Sterne's career in the church by supporting Fountayne's side.

=== The Good Humour Club ===
An additional target of the pamphlet's satire was a York gentlemen's club known as the Good Humour Club. There is no evidence that Sterne ever attended a meeting of the club, but he was aware of its existence and knew many of its members, who were prominent in York society. (Note: Specifically, Sterne was acquainted with at least nine members: Charles Atkinson, a surgeon and close friend of Sterne's; Reverend Joseph Bridges, another friend; Theophilus Garencieres, Sterne's apothecary; John Hildyard, a bookseller; John Hinxman, another bookseller; Sir William Milner, a political connection; Isaac Newton, surgeon and president of the club; Arthur Ricard, an attorney; and Caesar Ward, the bookseller and printer who produced the pamphlet.) The club was active from around 1725 to at least 1800. It permitted a maximum of eighteen members at a time (elected by a majority of current members), and met weekly at a local tavern or coffee house. Like many similar clubs at the time, the group's activities primarily consisted of informal socializing and drinking. Unusually, all members referred to each other with the honorific of "doctor", which also gave the club the nickname of the "Doctors' Club".

The president of the club, a surgeon named Isaac Newton, was mentioned in all three of the pamphlets preceding Sterne's. Topham asserted that Newton privately supported Topham's account of events; Fountayne rebutted with a letter from Newton, stating that Newton only seemed to do so under duress; and Topham replied with testimonials from two more club members, Theophilus Garencieres and Arthur Ricard, to support his version of events.

== Synopsis ==
A Political Romance begins with a 24-page epistolary account of some local village gossip. Ten years ago, a local sexton and dog-whipper, Trim, asked the parish clerk, John, to give him a pair of John's black plush breeches whenever John was done with them. John agreed. John later quarreled with the parson of the parish about a writing desk; in the quarrel, Trim sided with the parson, and the parson rewarded him with a fine outfit. To express his allegiance to the parson over John, Trim renounced his claim to the breeches. John therefore gave them to another friend, Mark Slender, whose request John had previously denied in favour of Trim. John also gave a pulpit-cloth and velvet cushion to William Doe. Mark Slender soon died, and the breeches were given to Lorry Slim.

A new parson arrives in town after the death of the previous one. Trim tells the new parson that John is untrustworthy, and asks to be given an old watch-coat. Despite excessive obsequious favours from Trim, the parson hesitates to make the gift until he can determine whether the coat belongs to anybody. Just as the parson discovers that it is a precious heirloom, Trim seizes the coat and deconstructs it to make it into an under-petticoat for his wife. Angry, the parson calls on the clerk, John, to record Trim's misdoings, poor character, and expulsion from the parson's house. Trim therefore revives the previous matter of the breeches, criticizing John in the town square for (he claims) breaking his promise and for mis-appropriating the goods given to William Doe, which Trim had also desired. However, the crowd turns on Trim, and he is mocked for his greed.

This narrative is followed by a 6-page postscript. To the writer's surprise, Trim has not quietly retreated from the public eye, but has instead renewed the old quarrel between John and the late parson about the writing desk, and attempted to complain about excessive ill-treatment by John. Trim is again shamed by the public. The postscript concludes, "the general Opinion, upon the whole, is this, That, in three several pitch'd Battles, Trim has been so trimm'd, as never disastrous Hero was trimm'd before him".

The next section is titled "The Key"; in an allegorical work, the key would usually be a guide identifying which concepts or real-life persons each character represents. This key instead continues the satire with more narrative prose. It claims that the pamphlet was found on the ground in York and was read by a local political club. It describes their debate over the meaning of the allegory, pairing character sketches of local figures with their comically improbable identifications.

This is followed by two letters signed by Laurence Sterne. The first, addressed to the printer, explicitly claims his authorship of the piece, and justifies its high price of one shilling (twice the six pence Topham charged for his most recent Reply). The second, addressed to Topham, contests some of Topham's evidence against Sterne in the ongoing personal conflict which the narrative satirizes.

== Allegory ==
The pamphlet's satirical narrative is an allegory, which diminishes recent personal disputes within the Church of England into a squabble for used clothing within a rural parish. The primary target of the narrative's satire is Francis Topham, whose attempts to acquire a range of minor posts is mocked as petty and demeaning. Sterne presents the Archbishop John Gilbert (an ally of Topham's and a rival of Sterne's patron John Fountayne) in a relatively positive light, as the new parson in the village who is well-meaning but misled by others. The pamphlet's purported key ridicules York's society more broadly, highlighting that all the local clergy were the subject of public mockery and poking fun at the ill-founded but widespread gossip among York's notable residents. A full explanation of each part of the allegory is provided in the introduction to the 1914 edition.

=== Allegorical key ===
- The new parson: Archbishop John Gilbert
- The late parson: Archbishop Matthew Hutton
- John the clerk: John Fountayne, Dean of York
- Trim the sexton: Dr. Francis Topham
- Mark Slender: Dr. Mark Braithwait
- William Doe: Mr. William Stables
- Lorry Slim: Laurence Sterne
- "one of the Sides-men, a grave, knowing old man" summoned by the parson to hear Trim defend his actions: Dr. William Herring (1691–1762), a cousin of Thomas Herring
- Dispute about the writing desk: a quarrel between Hutton and Fountayne about appointing a temporary preacher at York Minster (Note: In January 1751, Topham helped fuel a disagreement between Fountayne and Archbishop Hutton; according to Tim Parnell, "the conflict reached a head in a farcical scene in which Fountayne's appointed preacher locked himself into the pulpit of York Minster while the archbishop's appointee, sermon in hand, angrily rattled the locked door.")
- Trim's new outfit from the late parson: the patent of the Prerogative Courts, granted to Topham by Hutton against Fountayne's protests
- Black plush breeches: the commissaryship of Pickering and Pocklington
- Pulpit-cloth and velvet cushion: the commissaryship of the Dean and Chapter of York
- Watch-coat: the commissaryship of the Exchequer and Prerogative Courts of the Archbishop of York; ripping up the watch-coat signifies Topham's attempt to create a new patent for this post so that it would go to his heirs rather than allowing the archbishop to make future appointments
- The "Political Club" in Sterne's key: the "Good Humour Club", which met at Sutton's Coffee-House. The members of the club are understood to represent specific individuals, though they have not been identified.

== Publication and reception ==
=== First printing and suppression ===
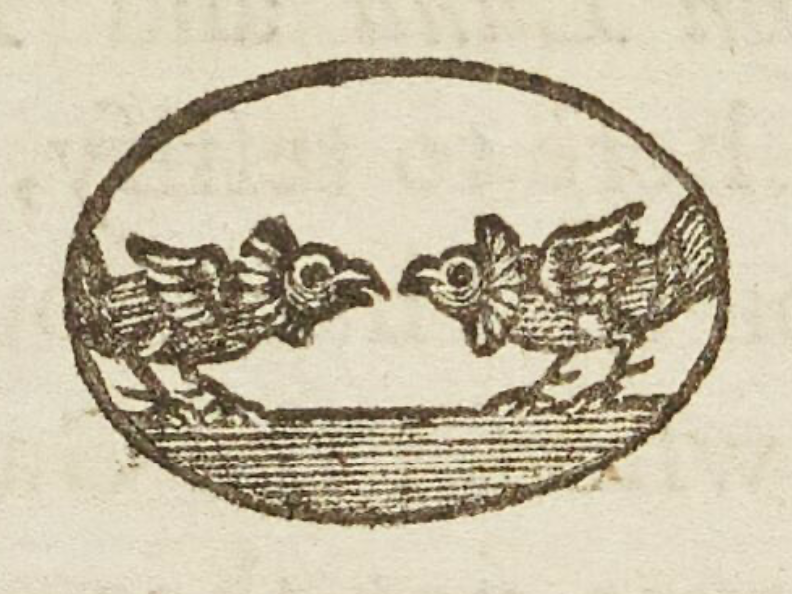
Image of two roosters, from page 30 of A Political Romance. Book historians have determined that this image was originally on the title page, but was moved at Sterne's request

Sterne wrote the first 24-page section some time between Fountayne's Answer (shortly after 25 December 1758) and Topham's Reply (no earlier than 13 January 1759), and sent its manuscript to the printer for typesetting. These 24 pages were printed by Caesar Ward in York and prepared for publication as a standalone work. After Topham's Reply appeared, Sterne wrote his postscript, satirical key, and two letters. These were then printed and combined with the earlier pages to form the new, complete work with a new title page. The letters that conclude the pamphlet are dated January 20, 1759. Sterne's letter to Ward, published within the pamphlet, objects to a "quaint Conceit" which was originally included on the title page; this has been identified as an image of a cockfight, which Ward moved to the end of the work. Sterne's letter complains that, on the title page, it "would only set People on smiling a Page or two before I give them Leave".

Sterne originally planned to publish anonymously, as both Topham and Fountayne had. However, Topham accused Fountayne of involving many co-authors for his Answer (likely true, and Sterne was likely one of the writers to assist); Sterne responded by claiming full authorship of A Political Romance. Sterne's 60-page pamphlet was released before the end of January, with no publisher listed. Roughly 500 copies were printed, but were not widely distributed.

Sterne's pamphlet prompted an end to Topham and Fountayne's arguments. The archbishop John Gilbert summoned Topham and Fountayne to London to settle their dispute. Topham volunteered to renounce his claims if the pamphlet was suppressed. Although the pamphlet presented the archbishop in a relatively positive light, he considered it embarrassing for an internal church matter to be exposed to public ridicule; he also desired its suppression. Following pressure on all sides, Sterne agreed to destroy the pamphlet. Church officials claimed all the copies at the printer's, bought any remaining for sale, and burned them. In 1760, the London Chronicle reported that Sterne "had thrown it into the fire, because 'twas too ill-natured." Sterne kept only his manuscript of the work.

=== Effect on Sterne's career ===
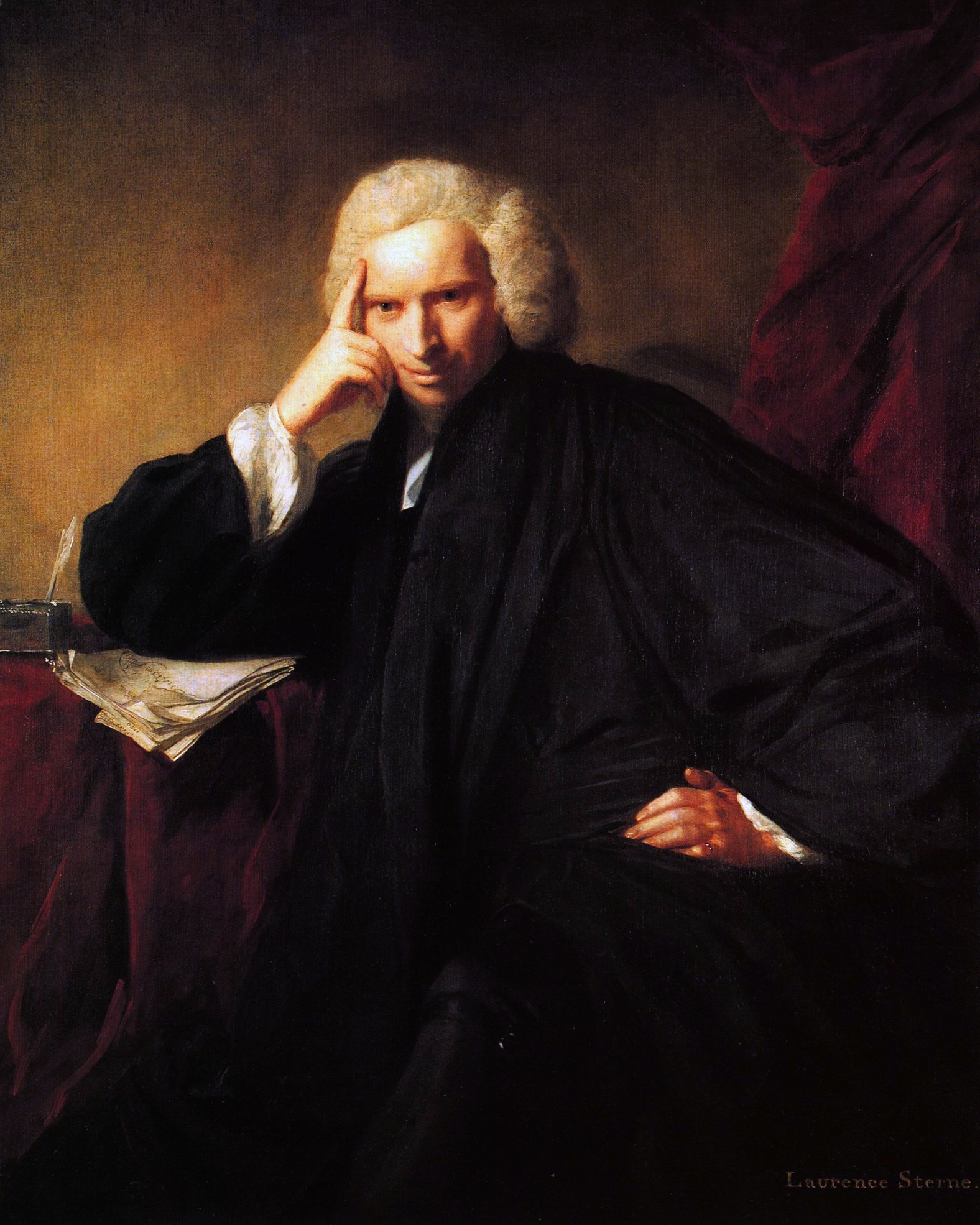
Portrait of Laurence Sterne, painted by Joshua Reynolds in 1760 after the success of Tristram Shandy; Sterne's elbow rests on the manuscript of that novel

In itself, the pamphlet was not a successful writing venture. Relatively few read it before it was destroyed, and it did not succeed in improving Sterne's standing with his patron Fountayne. Nonetheless, his experience with A Political Romance was a crucial turning point in Sterne's career, as it prompted him to consider humour writing as a serious path. The literary historian Ian Jack calls it "essential reading" for Sterne's "strange development" as a writer. Sterne had previously published political journalism, but the pamphlet was his first attempt at fiction. Reportedly, he later said that before finishing it, "he hardly knew he could write at all, much less with humour, so as to make his reader laugh." He immediately began and abandoned a satirical work now known as his "Rabelaisian Fragment", and just eight months later, his comic novel Tristram Shandy was ready to be printed; this work made him a literary celebrity the rest of his life. While preparing the printing of Tristram Shandy, he wrote to a friend, "Now you desire of knowing the reason of my turning author? why truly I am tired of employing my brains for other people's advantage.—'Tis a foolish sacrifice I made for some years to a foolish person."

=== Later publications ===
A Political Romance was never reprinted during Sterne's lifetime. While ill in late 1761, Sterne gave his wife permission to reprint it with some other unpublished works to earn money for his family if he died, but he expressed hope that it would not be necessary. He now considered the work too sycophantic to Fountayne, who did not live up to his hopes for patronage. He questioned whether Topham had merited all of his criticisms, and hoped the pamphlet could be forgotten, writing that it should "go to sleep". The literary historian Edward Simmen argues that Sterne also considered the satire "too topical to be of any lasting literary consequence."

Material from the pamphlet was first reprinted posthumously in 1769, by the London bookseller J. Murdoch. It is typically assumed that Sterne's friend John Hall-Stevenson provided Murdoch with a manuscript copy. In this edition, in addition to extensive alterations to Sterne's language, the editors cut off the last three parts of the text, i.e., half the work. This shorter, censored version was reprinted by other booksellers and incorporated into a 1780 edition of Sterne's collected works, now given the title The History of a Good Warm Watch-Coat. It continued to appear under that title in numerous subsequent collections. For nearly a hundred and fifty years, this was the only printed version of the text available, and some scholars doubted whether the pamphlet had ever been printed in Sterne's lifetime.

In 1905, an unexpected 1759 copy was found in the library of the dean and chapter of York. Since then, another five original copies have been found. Their survival after the suppression of the pamphlet was accidental. A 1914 edition published by the Club of Odd Volumes was the first to provide the full and uncensored text of A Political Romance. This edition was limited to 125 copies. The next complete transcript was published in 1968, edited by Ian Jack alongside A Sentimental Journey and Journal to Eliza and published by Oxford University Press. As of 1970, the pamphlet was still largely neglected in literary scholarship, with a chapter in Wilbur Cross's 1920s biography of Sterne constituting the majority of analysis. The Laurence Sterne and Sterneana database, created by the Sterne Digital Library project between 2019 and 2021, now hosts a digital facsimile of a first edition, with an introduction by Daniel Reed.

== Style and influences ==
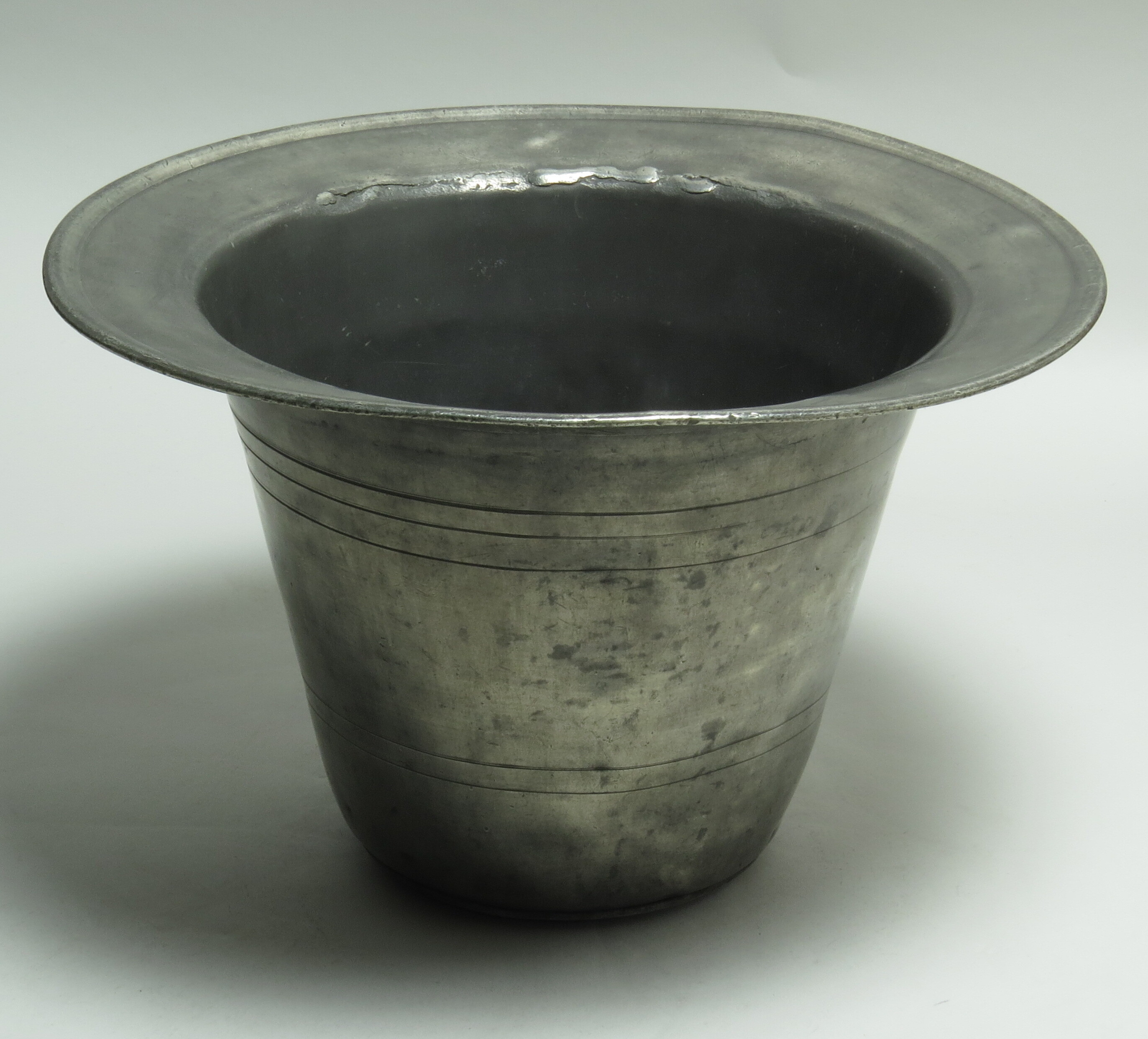
A pan made to be part of a close stool portable toilet. The pan holds the user's excrement and would usually be held by some kind of furniture seat. In A Political Romance, Trim carries a close stool pan through town on his head.

The most direct influence on Sterne's satirical style is Jonathan Swift, with further influence from Alexander Pope. The conceit of the narrative — translating the affairs of the great into the petty squabbles of a minor country parish — mirrors Swift's A Tale of a Tub (1704) and the depiction of Lilliput and Blefuscu in his Gulliver's Travels (1726), as well as Pope's comic work, Memoirs of P.P., Clerk of this Parish. It is also influenced by Le Lutrin (1674), a mock-heroic epic by Nicolas Boileau. Like A Tale of a Tub, A Political Romance takes some of its humour from being divided into many sub-sections.

Some of Sterne's jokes are scatological, such as a scene where Trim obsequiously curries favour with the new parson by carrying the pan for a close stool (a portable toilet) on his head through the town. Others involve bawdy puns, such as Trim's occupation as a "coney catcher", which referred literally to the task of catching rabbits (coneys) but also sounded like a slang term for vaginas (cunnys).

Sterne's comically useless "key" mirrors the similarly facetious "key" in Pope's satirical mock-epic The Rape of the Lock (1712). Pope's key also presents a prose narrative in which character present competing interpretations of the work. This section also shows similarities to Sterne's forthcoming novel, Tristram Shandy; according to the literary historian Ian Jack, it anticipates one of Tristram Shandy's core themes because "each disputant rides his own preposterous hobby-horse, and none shows any interest in the views advanced by his fellows." The literary scholar Helen Williams has argued that Sterne's depiction of the club introduces an element of an inside joke to the work's satire, since only a very local audience would recognize the figures being parodied.

The name of the character Trim is taken from a proverb which Jonathan Swift had previously used in a satire: "Trim-tram; like master, like man." Sterne was alluding to the fact that Topham's attempt to gain permanent access to a perquisite followed the same legal process used by both recent Archbishops of York. The allusion to this proverb undermined Sterne's attempt to satirize only Topham and not the archbishop, and may have increased the archbishop's desire to suppress the pamphlet.
