= Memoirs of Martinus Scriblerus =

18th century satirical work by the Scriblerus Club

The Memoirs of Martinus Scriblerus is an incomplete satirical work co-written ostensibly by the members of the Scriblerus Club during the years 1713–14, including Jonathan Swift, Alexander Pope and Dr. Arbuthnot. The only completed volume was published in 1741 as a part of Alexander Pope's Works. Martinus Scriblerus was a pseudonym of Pope's which was later also adopted by George Crabbe. The "Memoirs" bears the seeds of many successful later works borne out of the club, such as Swift's Gulliver and Pope's Dunciad.

Each chapter of the novel satirises a different fad or fashion of the period, mocking modern culture for its blind adherence both to new trends and outdated beliefs. The novel tells the story of Martinus Scriblerus' upbringing by his parents, who subject him to a range of strange customs such as refusing to allow his wet-nurse to eat beef and instead raising him solely on butter and honey, a diet supposedly advised by Eustathius. He grows up to be a strange, mixed character with little common sense.
