= Laurence Sterne =

Anglo-Irish writer and cleric (1713–1768)

The Reverend Laurence Sterne
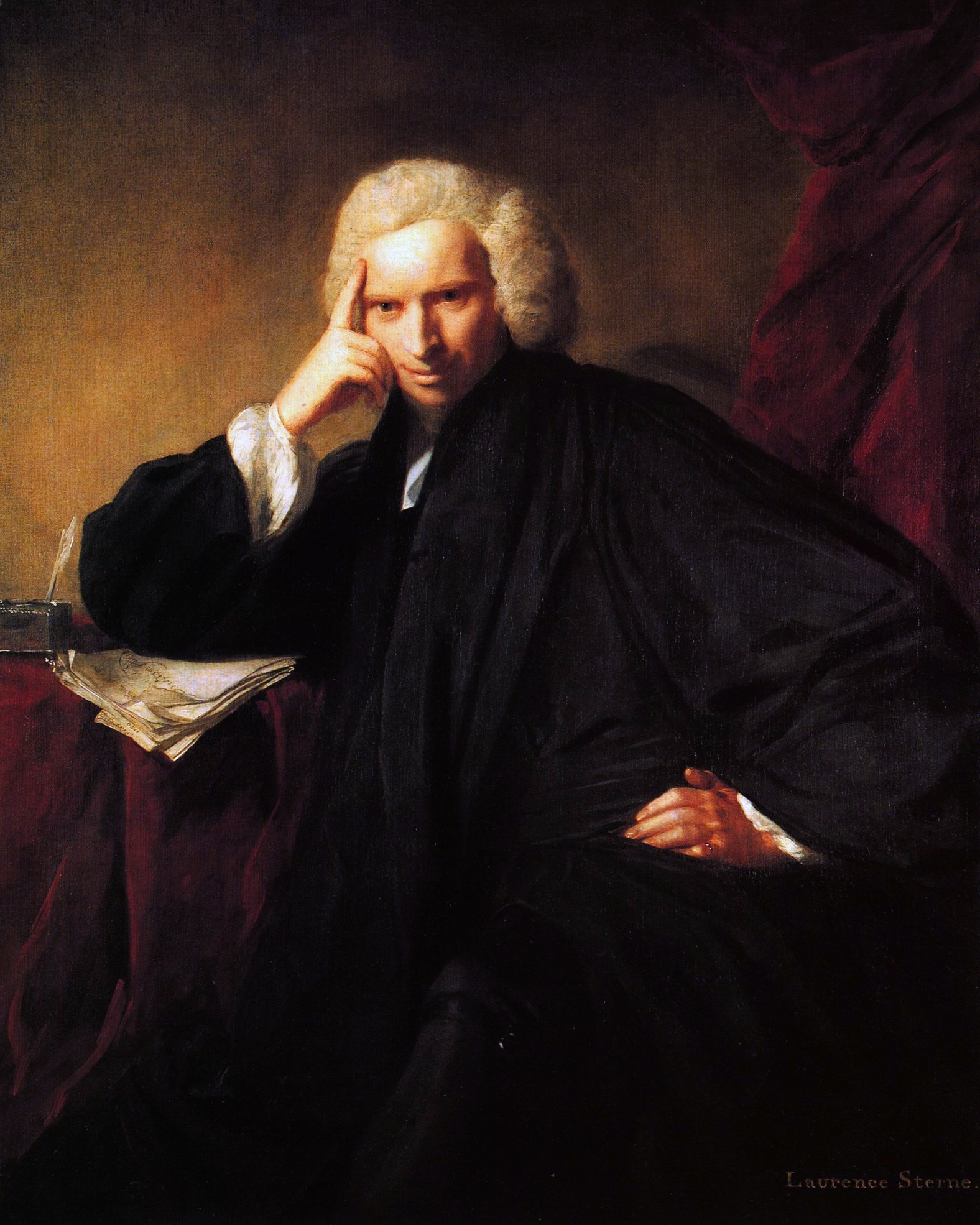
- Portrait of Laurence Sterne (1760)
- Born: 24 November 1713; Clonmel, Ireland
- Died: 18 March 1768 (aged 54); London, England
- Education: Jesus College, Cambridge
- Occupations: Novelist, clergyman
- Spouse: Elizabeth Lumley
- Writing career
- Notable works: The Life and Opinions of Tristram Shandy, Gentleman; A Sentimental Journey Through France and Italy; A Political Romance

Laurence Sterne (24 November 1713 – 18 March 1768) was an Anglo-Irish novelist and Anglican cleric. He is best known for his comic novels The Life and Opinions of Tristram Shandy, Gentleman (1759–1767) and A Sentimental Journey Through France and Italy (1768).

Sterne grew up in a military family, travelling mainly in Ireland but briefly in England. He attended Jesus College, Cambridge, on a sizarship, gaining bachelor's and master's degrees, and was ordained as a priest in 1738. While Vicar of Sutton-on-the-Forest, Yorkshire, he married Elizabeth Lumley in 1741. He briefly wrote political propaganda for the Whigs, but abandoned politics in 1742. In 1759, he wrote an ecclesiastical satire A Political Romance, which embarrassed the church and was burned. Having discovered his talent for comedy, at age 46 he dedicated himself to humour writing as a vocation. Also in 1759, he published the first volume of Tristram Shandy, which was an enormous success and continued for a total of nine volumes. He was a literary celebrity for the rest of his life. In addition to his novels, he published several volumes of sermons. Sterne died in 1768 and was buried in the yard of St George's, Hanover Square.

== Biography ==
=== Early life ===
Laurence Sterne was born in Clonmel, County Tipperary, in the Kingdom of Ireland on 24 November 1713. His father, Roger Sterne, was an ensign in a British regiment recently returned from Dunkirk. Roger's social standing was far lower than that of his recent ancestors: Roger's grandfather Richard Sterne had been the Archbishop of York. Roger was the second son of Richard's second son, and consequently, Roger inherited little of the familial wealth. Roger left his family to join the army at the age of 25; he enlisted uncommissioned, which was unusual for someone from a family of high social position. Roger married Agnes Herbert née Nuttall, the widow of a military captain, in 1711. Laurence was the second of their seven children, one of only three to survive to adulthood.

The first decade of Laurence Sterne's life was impoverished and unsettled. After his birth, the family spent six months in Clonmel, then ten months at Roger's mother's estate at Elvington Hall, while Roger had no army posting. From 1715 to 1723, the Sternes moved repeatedly (about once a year) between poor family lodgings in army barracks in Britain and Ireland, with brief ownership of a townhouse in Dublin during a particularly prosperous stint from 1717 to 1719. These postings included three separate moves to Dublin, at other times living in Plymouth, the Isle of Wight, Wicklow, Annamoe, and Carrickfergus. In 1723, at the age of ten, Sterne was relocated to his uncle's household in Halifax, on the condition that he would repay his uncle for the cost of his upkeep and education. This arrangement reflected both the poor financial resources of Sterne's father, and the strained relationship he had with his wealthier family members. Sterne never saw his father again, as Roger was next ordered to Jamaica where he died of malaria in 1731.

=== Education and ecclesiastical career ===
Sterne attended boarding school at Hipperholme Grammar School in Yorkshire, near his uncle's estate. There, he received a traditional classical education. In July 1733, at the age of twenty, he was admitted to Jesus College, Cambridge with a sizarship that allowed him to afford attendance. He graduated with a Bachelor of Arts in January 1737. Sterne was ordained as a deacon on 6 March 1737 and as a priest on 20 August 1738. He returned to Cambridge in the summer of 1740 to be awarded his Master of Arts. His religion is said to have been the "centrist Anglicanism of his time", known as latitudinarianism. A few days after his ordination as a priest, Sterne was awarded the vicarage living of Sutton-on-the-Forest in Yorkshire.

Sterne married Elizabeth Lumley on 30 March 1741, despite both being ill with consumption. Only one of their several children survived infancy, a daughter named Lydia. Throughout their marriage, Sterne had adulterous affairs, and developed "an unsavoury but deserved reputation as a libertine".

In 1743, he was presented to the neighbouring living of Stillington by Reverend Richard Levett, prebendary of Stillington, who was patron of the living. Subsequently, Sterne did duty both there and at Sutton. Sterne lived in Sutton for 20 years, during which time he continued a close friendship that had begun at Cambridge with John Hall-Stevenson, a witty and accomplished bon vivant, owner of Skelton Hall in the Cleveland district of Yorkshire.

Sterne's life at this time was closely tied with his uncle, Jaques Sterne, the archdeacon of Cleveland and precentor of York Minster. Sterne's uncle was an ardent Whig, and urged Sterne to begin a career of political journalism. Sterne wrote anonymous propaganda in the York Gazetteer from 1741 to 1742. Sterne's published attacks on the Tory party earned him career favours from the church (including a prebendary of York Minster), but also harsh personal criticism. Sterne abruptly abandoned his political writing, leading to a permanent falling-out with his uncle, and stalling his ecclesiastical career.

In 1744, Sterne purchased several pieces of farmland in Sutton, with the hope that raising crops and dairy cattle would supplement his household's foodstores and finances. However, the farm was not particularly successful. Meanwhile, he sought patronage from John Fountayne, a college acquaintance who became Dean of York in 1747. To earn Fountayne's favor, Sterne wrote the Latin sermon which Fountayne preached in order to earn his doctorate of divinity. In 1751, Fountayne granted Sterne a very minor post, the commisaryship of Pocklington and Pickering. In 1758, Sterne gave up directly farming his land, and leased the property out. He relocated to York to assist Fountayne with bureaucratic tasks, in hopes of further preferment.

=== Writing ===
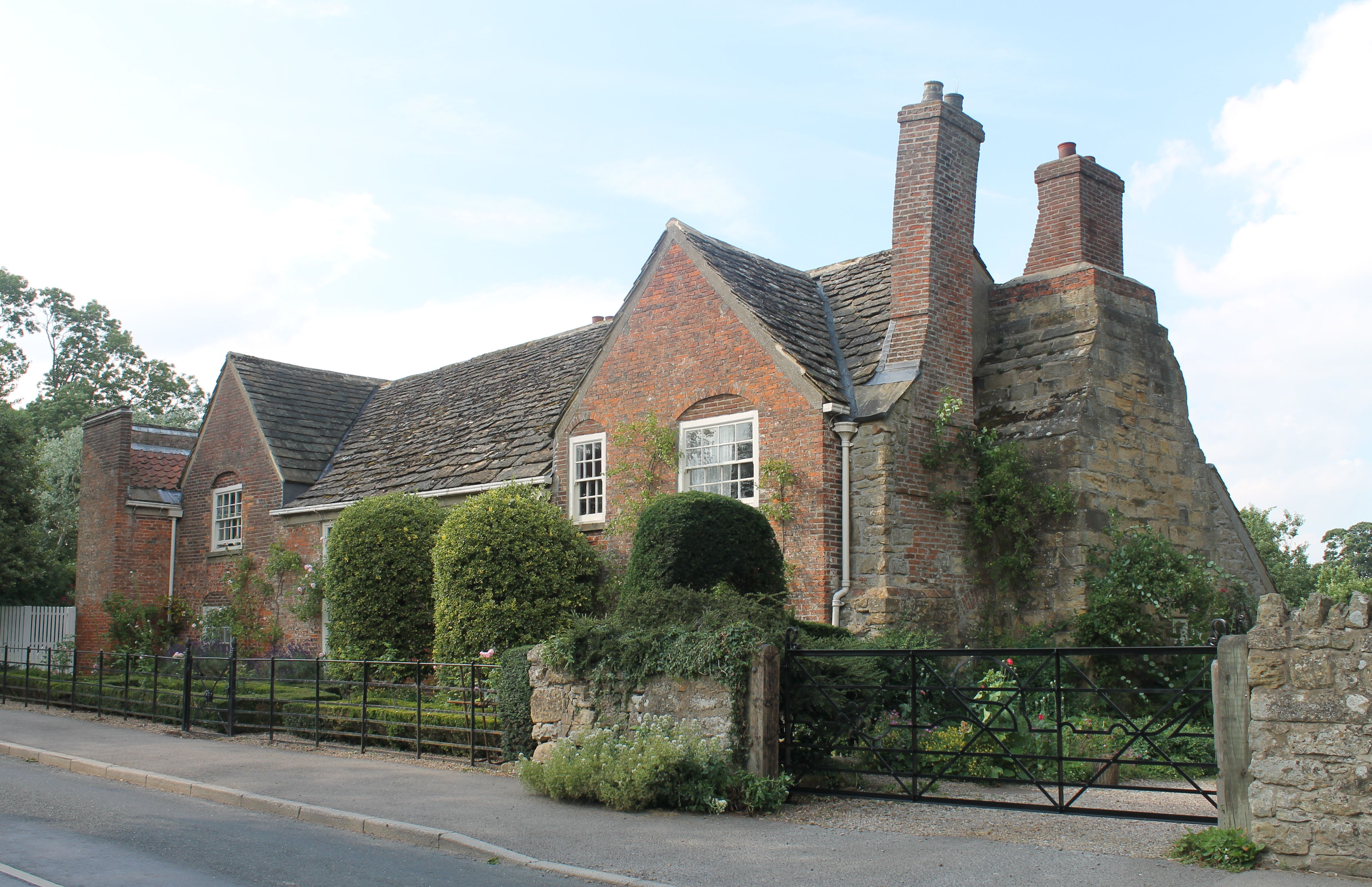
Shandy Hall, Sterne's home in Coxwold, North Yorkshire

In 1759, Sterne contributed to a pamphlet war related to Fountayne's rivalries within the church. Fountayne was criticized by an ambitious ecclesiastical lawyer, Francis Topham, who complained that he had been unfairly passed over for the commissaryship granted to Sterne. Topham and Fountayne published a series of open letters criticizing each other, which spurred several replies from their acquaintance. Sterne published A Political Romance in January 1759, a satirical work with unflattering caricatures of Fountayne's critics. Unusually for a pamphlet, Sterne explicitly attached his name to the work. The Archbishop of York was embarrassed by how public the church's internal disputes had become, and ordered all 500 copies of A Political Romance burned. Sterne complied, but a handful of copies accidentally survived from other owners.

Despite its lack of success, A Political Romance was a turning point for Sterne. Reportedly, he later said that before finishing it, "he hardly knew he could write at all, much less with humour, so as to make his reader laugh." At the age of 46, Sterne dedicated himself to writing for the rest of his life. He immediately began work on his best-known novel, The Life and Opinions of Tristram Shandy, Gentleman, the first volumes of which were published in 1759. Sterne was at work on his celebrated comic novel during the year that his mother died, his wife was seriously ill, and his daughter was also taken ill with a fever. He wrote as fast as he possibly could, composing the first 18 chapters between January and March 1759. Sterne borrowed money for the printing of his novel, suggesting that he was confident in the prospective commercial success of his work.

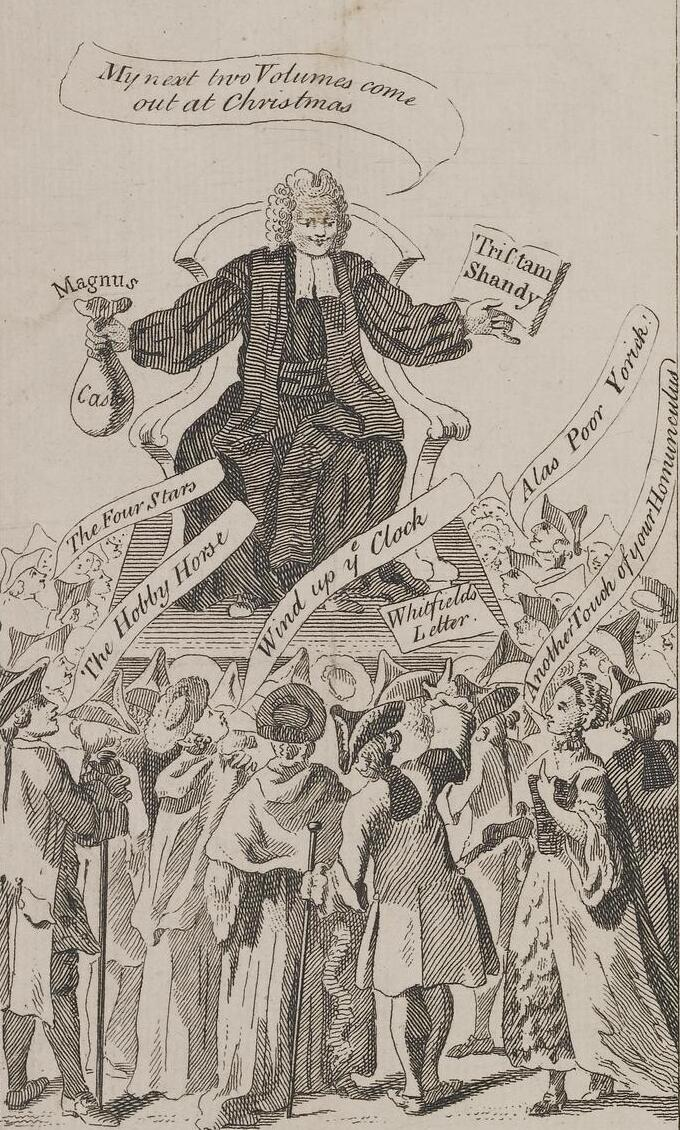
1760 caricature of Sterne, holding a bag of cash in one hand and Tristram Shandy in the other, promising "My next two Volumes come out at Christmas" to a crowd of people quoting the novel

The publication of Tristram Shandy made Sterne famous in London and on the continent. He was delighted by the attention, famously saying, "I wrote not [to] be fed but to be famous." He spent part of each year in London, being fêted as new volumes appeared. As Sterne assiduously promoted his book, some of the attention he received was scandal: at the time, it was slightly disreputable for any gentleman to write for financial gain; for a clergyman to appear motivated by money, and to use "indecent" humour to pursue it, was doubly questionable. Sterne's bawdiness was criticized in a series of 1760s pamphlets, and he was encouraged to "mend his style" by the Bishop of Gloucester. Even after the publication of volumes three and four of Tristram Shandy, Sterne's love of attention (especially as related to financial success) remained undiminished. In one letter, he wrote, "One half of the town abuse my book as bitterly, as the other half cry it up to the skies—the best is, they abuse it and buy it, and at such a rate, that we are going on with a second edition, as fast as possible." Baron Fauconberg rewarded Sterne by appointing him as the perpetual curate of Coxwold in the North Riding of Yorkshire in March 1760.

In 1766, the Black Briton Ignatius Sancho wrote to Sterne, encouraging him to lobby for the abolition of the slave trade. Sterne replied that he had just been at work on "a tender tale of the sorrows of a friendless poor negro-girl", and volume nine included a scene with a Black shop girl too kindhearted to kill flies. Sterne and Sancho's correspondence was widely publicised beginning in 1775, and this scene and their letters became an integral part of 18th-century abolitionist literature.

=== Foreign travel ===
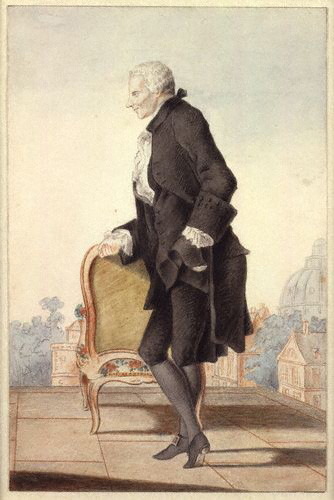
Sterne painted in watercolour by French artist Louis Carrogis Carmontelle, c. 1762

Sterne's intensive writing efforts worsened his tuberculosis, and in January 1762 he travelled to France to benefit from the warmer climate. He attached himself to a diplomatic party bound for Turin, as England and France were still adversaries in the Seven Years' War. Sterne was gratified by his reception in France, where reports of the genius of Tristram Shandy made him a celebrity. After a few months he invited his wife and daughter to join him, since his daughter's health was also suffering. They met him in Paris in July 1762, and made the move to Toulouse. He had several dangerous bouts of illness, including six weeks sick in an epidemic fever, but his daughter's health did improve. In June 1763, Sterne was bored of Toulouse and the family spent some time travelling. In March 1764, Sterne settled his wife and daughter in Montauban and returned to England alone, travelling via Paris and London and finally reaching York in June. There, he continued to delegate his clerical duties to the curate who had performed them during his absence, and focused on fiction writing.

He travelled again through France and Italy from 1765 to 1766, departing England in October 1765. He travelled through Paris, Lyons, Turin, and several other Italian cities on his way to Rome. He reached Naples in early 1766. His health improved, though that of his daughter, who had relocated to Tours, did not. He visited them in May 1766 as part of his return journey, and returned to Yorkshire by the end of June.

While travelling, Sterne did not keep a journal, though he told his acquaintances he planned to write a travel narrative of his journey. Aspects of his experiences abroad were incorporated into his second novel, A Sentimental Journey Through France and Italy.

=== Eliza ===
Early in 1767, Sterne met Eliza Draper, the wife of an official of the East India Company, while she was staying on her own in London. He was captivated by Eliza's charm and vivacity, and they began a mutual flirtation. They met frequently and exchanged miniature portraits. Sterne's admiration turned into an obsession, which he took no trouble to conceal. To his great distress, Eliza had to return to India three months after their first meeting, and he died a year later without seeing her again. In 1768, Sterne published his Sentimental Journey, which contains some extravagant references to her; and their relationship aroused considerable interest. He also wrote his Journal to Eliza, part of which he sent to her, and the rest of which came to light when it was presented to the British Museum in 1894. After Sterne's death, Eliza allowed ten of his letters to be published under the title Letters from Yorick to Eliza and succeeded in suppressing her letters to him, though some blatant forgeries were produced in a volume of Eliza's Letters to Yorick.

=== Death ===
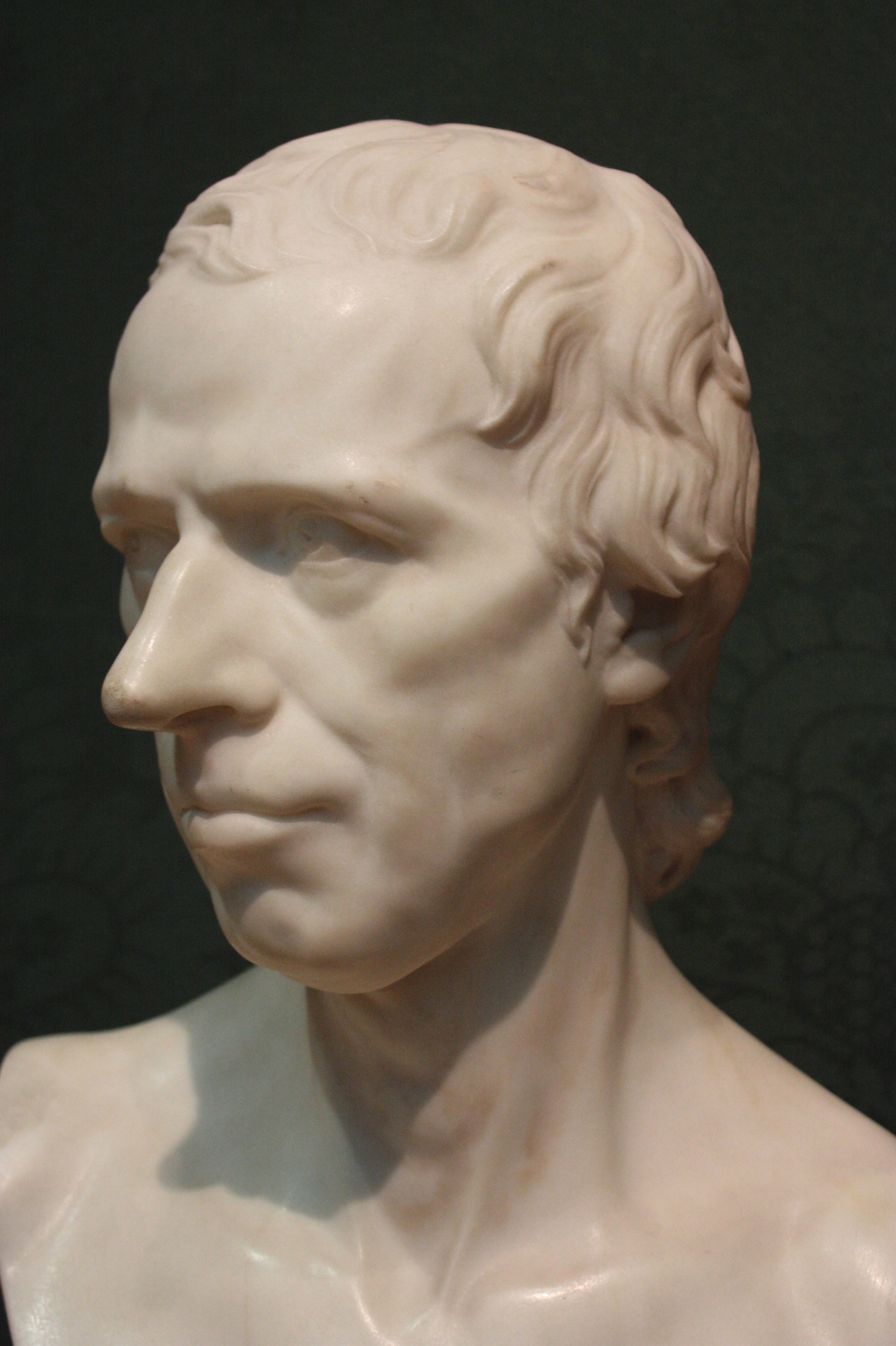
Portrait bust by Joseph Nollekens, 1766, National Portrait Gallery, London

Less than a month after Sentimental Journey was published, Sterne died in his lodgings at 41 Old Bond Street on 18 March 1768, at the age of 54. He was buried in the churchyard of St George's, Hanover Square, on 22 March.

It was rumoured that Sterne's body was stolen shortly after it was interred and sold to anatomists at Cambridge University. Circumstantially, it was said that his body was recognised by Charles Collignon, who knew him and discreetly reinterred him back in St George's, in an unknown plot. A year later a group of Freemasons erected a memorial stone with a rhyming epitaph near to his original burial place. A second stone was erected in 1893, correcting some factual errors on the memorial stone. When the churchyard of St. George's was redeveloped in 1969, amongst 11,500 skulls disinterred, several were identified with drastic cuts from anatomising or a post-mortem examination. One was identified to be of a size that matched a bust of Sterne made by Nollekens. The skull was held up to be his, albeit with "a certain area of doubt". Along with nearby skeletal bones, these remains were transferred to Coxwold churchyard in 1969 by the Laurence Sterne Trust. The story of the reinterment of Sterne's skull in Coxwold is alluded to in Malcolm Bradbury's novel To the Hermitage.

== Works ==
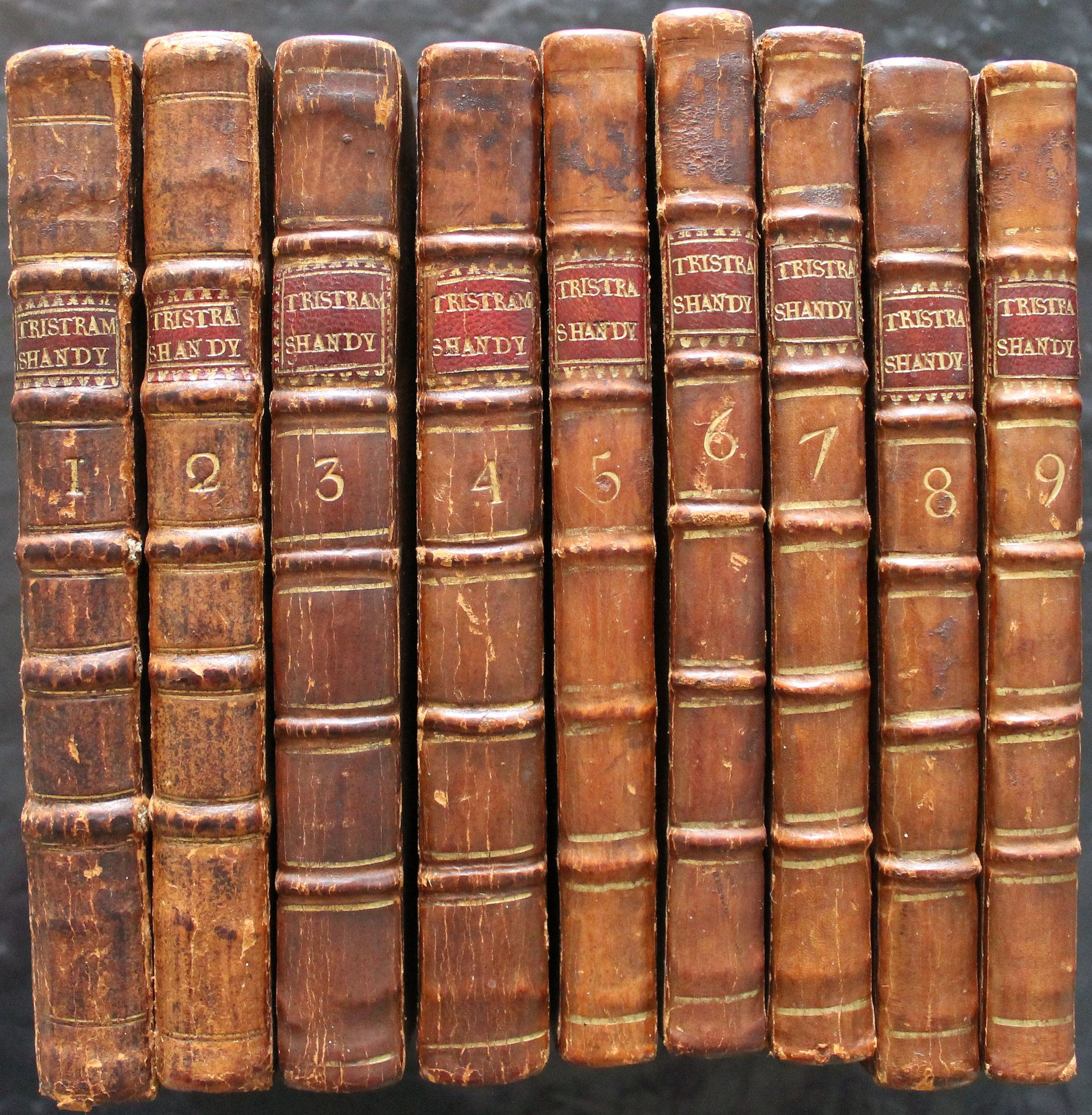
First edition of Tristram Shandy, printed in nine volumes, part of the collection of the Laurence Sterne Trust at Shandy Hall

The works of Laurence Sterne are few in comparison to other eighteenth-century authors of comparable stature. Sterne's early works were letters; he had two sermons published (in 1747 and 1750) and tried his hand at satire. He was involved in and wrote about local politics in 1742. His major publication prior to Tristram Shandy was the satire A Political Romance (1759), aimed at conflicts of interest within York Minster. A posthumously published piece on the art of preaching, A Fragment in the Manner of Rabelais, appears to have been written in 1759. Rabelais was by far Sterne's favourite author, and in his correspondence, he made clear that he considered himself as Rabelais' successor in humour writing, distancing himself from Jonathan Swift.

Sterne's novel The Life and Opinions of Tristram Shandy, Gentleman sold widely in England and throughout Europe. Translations of the work began to appear in all the major European languages almost immediately upon its publication. The novel itself starts with the narration, by Tristram, of his own conception. It proceeds mostly by what Sterne calls "progressive digressions" so that we do not reach Tristram's birth before the third volume. The novel is rich in characters and humour, and the influences of Rabelais and Miguel de Cervantes are present throughout. The novel ends after 9 volumes, published over a decade, but without anything that might be considered a traditional conclusion. Sterne inserts sermons, essays and legal documents into the pages of his novel; and he explores the limits of typography and print design by including marbled pages and an entirely black page within the narrative.

English writer and literary critic Samuel Johnson's verdict in 1776 was that "Nothing odd will do long. Tristram Shandy did not last." This is strikingly different from the views of continental European critics of the day, who praised Sterne and Tristram Shandy as innovative and superior. Voltaire called it "clearly superior to Rabelais", and later Goethe praised Sterne as "the most beautiful spirit that ever lived". Swedish translator Johan Rundahl described Sterne as an arch-sentimentalist. Sterne influenced European writers as diverse as Denis Diderot and the German Romanticists. His work also had noticeable influence over Brazilian author Machado de Assis, who made use of the digressive technique in the novel The Posthumous Memoirs of Bras Cubas. The Russian Formalist writer Viktor Shklovsky regarded Tristram Shandy as the archetypal, quintessential novel, "the most typical novel of world literature." Many of the innovations that Sterne introduced, adaptations in form that were an exploration of what constitutes the novel, were highly influential to Modernist writers like James Joyce and Virginia Woolf, and more recent writers such as Thomas Pynchon and David Foster Wallace. Italo Calvino referred to Tristram Shandy as the "undoubted progenitor of all avant-garde novels of our century". More recently, scholarly opinions of Tristram Shandy include those who minimize its significance as an innovation. Since the 1950s, following the lead of D. W. Jefferson, there are those who argue that, whatever its legacy of influence may be, Tristram Shandy in its original context actually represents a resurgence of a much older, Renaissance tradition of "Learned Wit"—owing a debt to such influences as the Scriblerian approach.

Sterne's final novel, A Sentimental Journey Through France and Italy, has many stylistic parallels with Tristram Shandy, and the narrator is one of the minor characters from the earlier novel. At its first publication, A Sentimental Journey was warmly received by readers who saw it as more sentimental and less bawdy than Tristram Shandy. From Sterne's death through the nineteenth century, A Sentimental Journey was considered Sterne's best and most beloved work, and it was more widely reprinted than Tristram Shandy. Today, A Sentimental Journey is often interpreted by critics as part of the same artistic project to which Tristram Shandy belongs. In addition to his fiction, two volumes of Sterne's Sermons were published during his lifetime; more copies of his Sermons were sold in his lifetime than copies of Tristram Shandy. In the years after Sterne's death, his family published additional sermons, as well as letter collections of his correspondence.

== Publication history ==
- 1743 – The Unknown World: Verses Occasioned by Hearing a Pass-Bell (disputed, possibly written by Hubert Stogdon)
- 1747 – "The Case of Elijah and the Widow of Zerephath"
- 1750 – "The Abuses of Conscience"
- 1759 – A Political Romance
- 1759 – "Fragment in the Manner of Rabelais"
- 1759 – Tristram Shandy vols. 1 and 2
- 1760 – The Sermons of Mr. Yorick vol. 1 and 2
- 1761 – Tristram Shandy vols. 3–6
- 1765 – Tristram Shandy vols. 7 and 8
- 1766 – The Sermons of Mr. Yorick vols. 3 and 4
- 1767 – Tristram Shandy vol. 9
- 1768 – A Sentimental Journey through France and Italy
- 1769 – Sermons by the Late Rev. Mr. Sterne vols. 5–7 (a continuation of The Sermons of Mr. Yorick)
- 1773 – Letters from Yorick to Eliza
- 1775 – Letters of the Late Rev. Mr. Laurence Sterne

== See also ==
- List of abolitionist forerunners
- List of Irish writers
