= List of acts of the Parliament of Scotland from 1703 =

This is a list of acts of the Parliament of Scotland for the year 1703.

It lists acts of Parliament of the old Parliament of Scotland, that was merged with the old Parliament of England to form the Parliament of Great Britain, by the Union with England Act 1707 (c. 7).

For other years, see list of acts of the Parliament of Scotland. For the period after 1707, see list of acts of the Parliament of Great Britain.

== 1703 ==
The 1st session of the parliament of Anne, held in Edinburgh from 6 May 1703 until 16 September 1703.

Short title, or popular name	Citation	Royal assent
Long title
Queen's Authority Act 1703 (repealed)	1703 c. 1 (Note: This is the citation in the Record Edition.); 1703 c. 1 (Note: This is the citation in the Duodecimal Edition.)	19 May 1703
Act Asserting and Recognizeing her Majesties Authority. (Repealed by Statute Law Revision (Scotland) Act 1906 (6 Edw. 7. c. 38))
Act of Security 1703 (repealed)	1703 c. 2; 1703 c. 2	16 September 1703
Act for Secureing the true Protestant Religion and Presbyterian Government. (Repealed by Statute Law Revision (Scotland) Act 1906 (6 Edw. 7. c. 38))
Parliament of 1689 Act 1703 (repealed)	1703 c. 3; 1703 c. 3	16 September 1703
Act Ratifieing the turning the meeting of the Estates in the year 1689 into a Parliament. (Repealed by Statute Law Revision (Scotland) Act 1906 (6 Edw. 7. c. 38))
Leasing Makers Act 1703 (repealed)	1703 c. 4; 1703 c. 4	16 September 1703
Act anent Leesing Makers and Slanderers. (Repealed by Statute Law Revision (Scotland) Act 1906 (6 Edw. 7. c. 38))
Not public and general	1703 c. 5 — (Note: Not listed in the Duodecimal Edition.)	16 September 1703
Act for proveing the tenor of burnt writs in favors of Anna Cockburn daughter to the deceast Patrick Cockburne of Borthwick.
Peace and War Act 1703 (repealed)	1703 c. 6; 1703 c. 5	16 September 1703
Act Anent Peace and War. (Repealed by Repeal of Certain Scotch Acts 1707 (6 Ann. c. 36))
Public Accounts Act 1703 (repealed)	1703 c. 7; 1703 c. 6	16 September 1703
Act and Commission anent the Public Accounts. (Repealed by Statute Law Revision (Scotland) Act 1906 (6 Edw. 7. c. 38))
Butchers Act 1703 (repealed)	1703 c. 8; 1703 c. 7	16 September 1703
Act Dischargeing Butchers to be Grasiers, &c. (Repealed by Statute Law Revision (Scotland) Act 1906 (6 Edw. 7. c. 38))
Company of Scotland Act 1703 (repealed)	1703 c. 9; 1703 c. 8	16 September 1703
Act in favors of the Company trading to Africa and the Indies. (Repealed by Statute Law Revision (Scotland) Act 1906 (6 Edw. 7. c. 38))
Irish Victual Act 1703 (repealed)	1703 c. 10; 1703 c. 9	16 September 1703
Act Dischargeing Importation of Irish Victual Beef and Cattle. (Repealed by Statute Law Revision (Scotland) Act 1906 (6 Edw. 7. c. 38))
Wool Act 1703 (repealed)	1703 c. 11; 1703 c. 10	16 September 1703
Act continuing the Prohibition of Exporting English or Irish Wool till the next Session of Parliament inclusive. (Repealed by Statute Law Revision (Scotland) Act 1906 (6 Edw. 7. c. 38))
Not public and general	1703 c. 12 —	16 September 1703
Act in favors of William Montgomery George Linn for a Manufactory of Lame Purslane and Earthen ware.
Wine Act 1703 (repealed)	1703 c. 13; 1703 c. 11	16 September 1703
Act allowing the Importation of Wines and other Foreign Liquors. (Repealed by Statute Law Revision (Scotland) Act 1906 (6 Edw. 7. c. 38))

=== Sources ===
- Alexander, William (1841). "Acta Parliamentorum Annæ". An Abridgement of the Acts of the Parliaments of Scotland. Edinburgh: Adam and Charles Black. p. 521 – via Google Books.
- Alexander, William (1841). "Acta Parliamentorum Annæ". An Abridgement of the Acts of the Parliaments of Scotland. Edinburgh: Adam and Charles Black. p. 521 – via Google Books.
- Chronological Table of the Statutes. London: Her Majesty's Stationery Office. 1972. p. 1367 – via Google Books.
- "Index of Statutes: Anne (1702-1707)". Records of the Parliaments of Scotland to 1707. University of St Andrews.

== See also ==
- List of legislation in the United Kingdom
- Records of the Parliaments of Scotland
