= Lewis Atterbury =

Lewis Atterbury may refer to:

- Lewis Atterbury the elder (died 1693), English clergyman
- Lewis Atterbury (chaplain) (1656–1731), English churchman and chaplain, son of the above

== See also ==
- Lewis Atterbury Stimson (1844–1917), American surgeon
