= Sermons of Laurence Sterne =

Sermons by 18th-century Anglican cleric

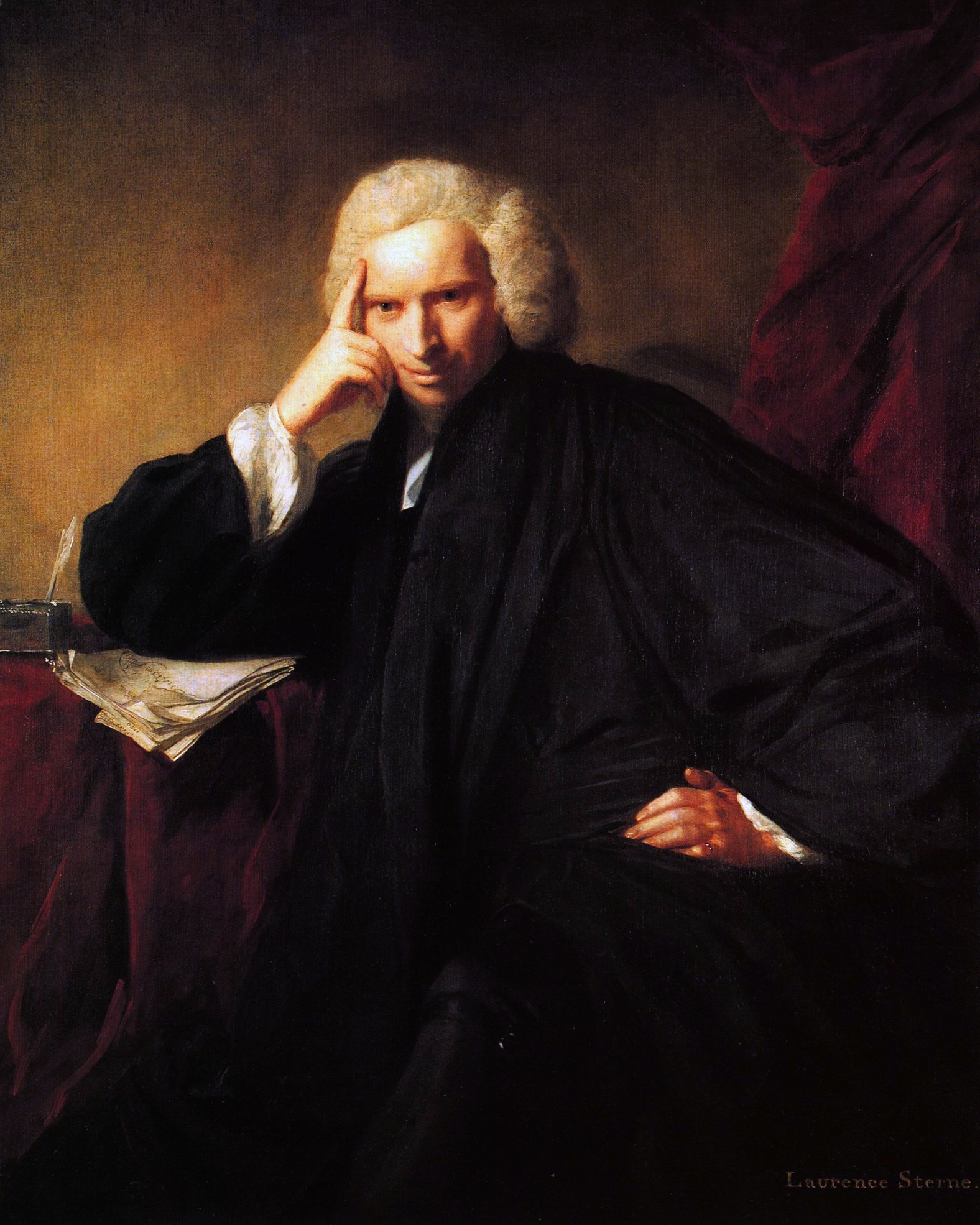
Portrait of Laurence Sterne by Joshua Reynolds, 1760

The writer Laurence Sterne delivered hundreds of sermons across his career as an Anglican clergyman. Of these, forty-five were published: in two pamphlets in 1747 and 1750, and in three book collections in 1760, 1766, and 1769.

Sterne spent most of his clerical career as the vicar at Sutton-on-the-Forest and a prebendary of York. A skilled public speaker, he preached regularly at his small rural parish, and for a larger audience at York Minster. Two of his public sermons in York were published as pamphlets while he was an obscure rural clergyman, "The Case of Elijah and the Widow of Zerephath" in 1747 and "Abuses of Conscience" in 1750. In 1760, Sterne became a literary celebrity for his comic novel Tristram Shandy. One widely praised scene featured a character reading the sermon "Abuses of Conscience", attributed to Sterne's self-insert character Parson Yorick. To capitalize on his newfound fame, Sterne published his first collection of sermons the same year, under the title The Sermons of Mr. Yorick. He published two more volumes in 1766. After Sterne's death in 1768, his daughter Lydia and close friend John Hall-Stevenson published a three-volume collection in 1769 under the title Sermons by the Late Rev. Mr. Sterne. All three book collections were partially financed by subscription, and listed hundreds of supporters.

Stylistically, the sermons are noted for their light-hearted character sketches, similar to his fiction writing. They also extensively re-use writing by other authors. This re-use has been characterized as plagiarism by Sterne's critics, though historians today see textual borrowing as an uncontroversial part of sermon-writing in the eighteenth century. Sterne borrowed most frequently from John Tillotson, an Archbishop of Canterbury who influentially focused on preaching "practical divinity" rather than complex doctrinal issues. Other major influences include Joseph Hall, Samuel Clarke, and Joseph Butler. When first published, Sterne's sermons were widely praised, and reprinted even more often than his novels. Readers wrestled with the contradictions between Sterne's reputation as a bawdy humourist and the moral purity expected from a clergyman. One reviewer wrote, "we are astonished a man can deliver such sentiments, and act such a life!" As religious writing grew less popular, interest in Sterne's sermons declined substantially. They have never been out of print, but they are no longer widely read or studied except by scholars interested in Sterne's fiction.

== Sterne's clerical career ==
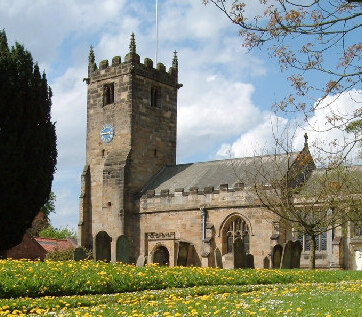
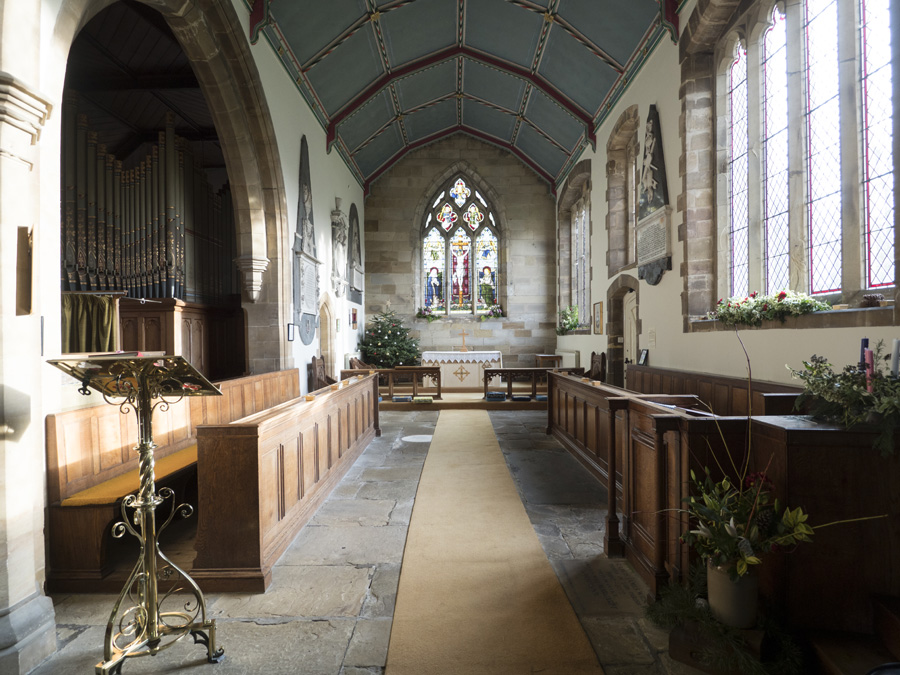
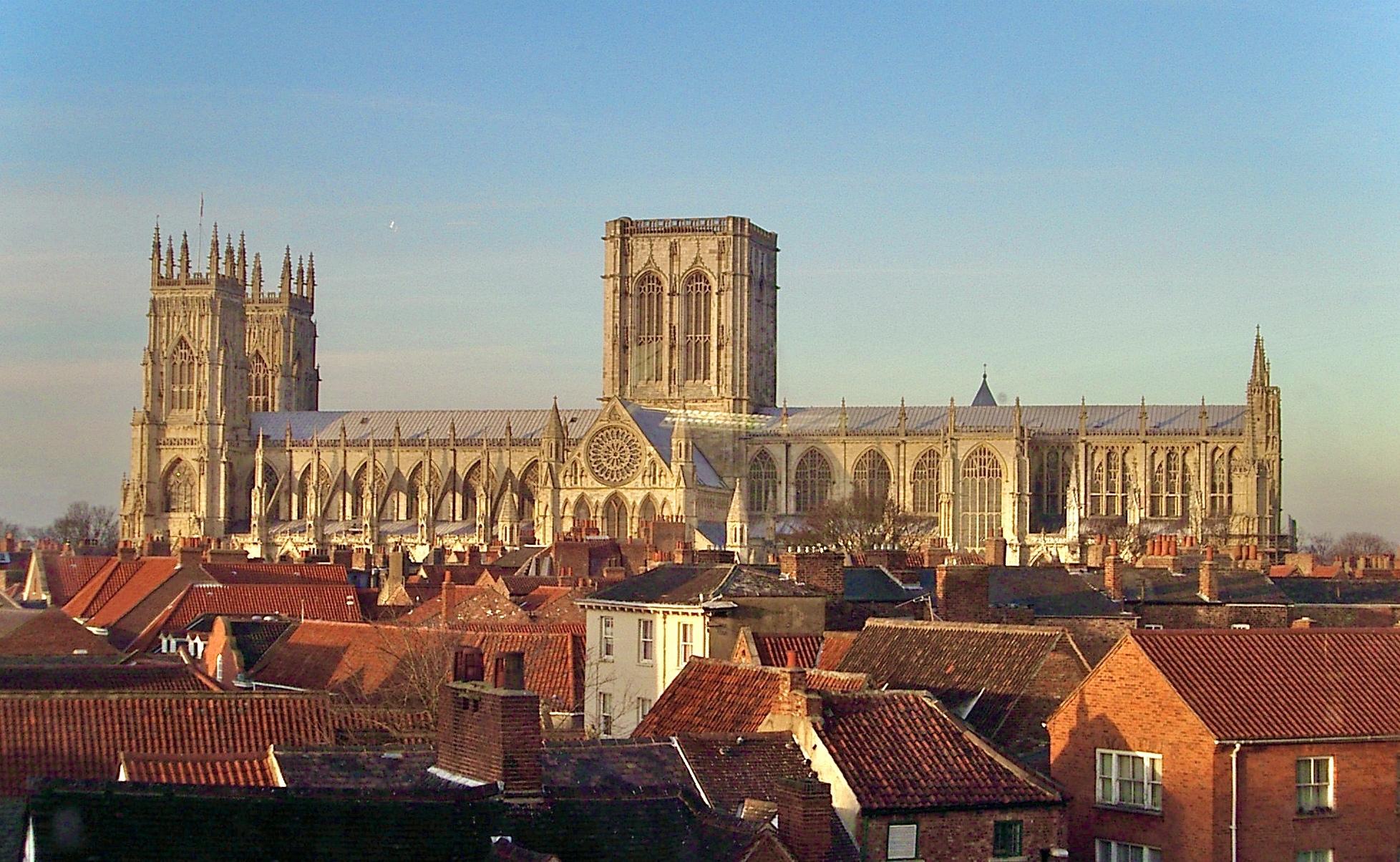
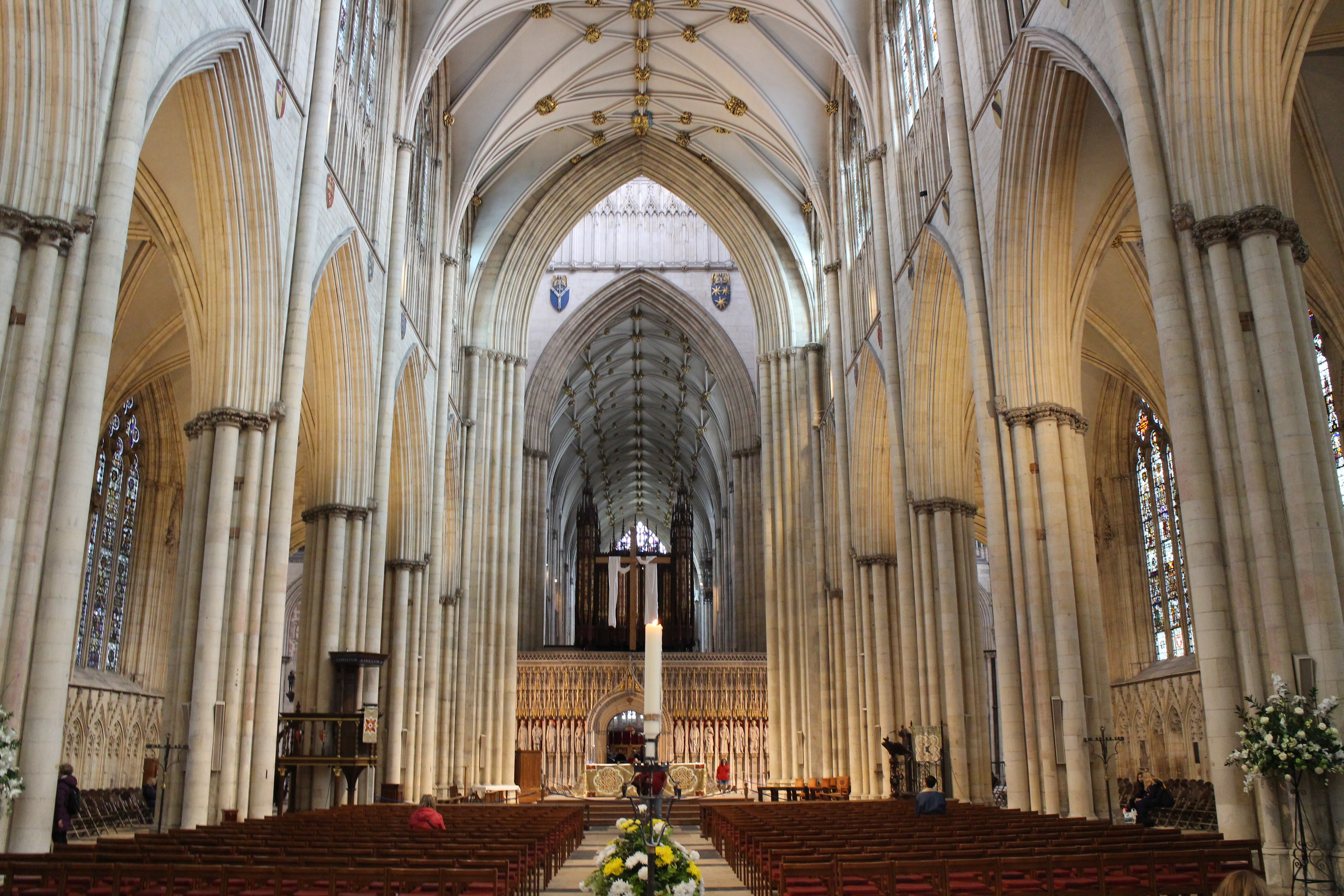
Exterior and interior of All Hallows Church in Sutton-on-the-Forest and York Minster cathedral, two churches where Sterne frequently preached

Sterne began his education at Jesus College, Cambridge in 1733 and received his orders in August 1738. His first clerical position was as assistant curate of St. Ives in 1737, and the next year he became the vicar at Sutton-on-the-Forest, where he remained until 1760. There, he served about 120 families of parishioners with two services on Sundays. Sterne's role as prebendary of York obliged him to give two sermons a year at York Minster, though some years he gave more than twenty. The extra sermons may have reflected a particular skill for preaching, or a particular interest in earning extra income. Sterne delivered hundreds of sermons across his career, most of which have not been preserved.

Sterne was described as a skilled preacher, at least until the 1760s when his worsening tuberculosis reduced the strength of his voice. One of his parishioners recalled: "he never preached at Sutton but half the [congregation] were in tears--The Minster was crowded whenever it was known that he was to preach--he used often to preach nearly extempore". One of his peers also commented that "[his] Doctrine, (tho Chiefly Extempory) takes so well among the Congregation that the Church can Scarce Contain the Number of People that appear every Sunday". According to the literary historian Melvyn New, Sterne was likely praised for speaking "extemporaneously" not because he had no written text to read from, but because he memorized his text for a more fluent spoken performance. Another indication of public speaking skill is the number of fund-raising charity sermons he was invited to deliver before he achieved his fame as an author: his biographer Arthur H. Cash argues that "there were only three reasons to invite an eighteenth-century clergyman to preach a charity sermon--because he was influential, because he was famous or because he was a good preacher"; at the time, Sterne could only have been a good preacher.

== Publications ==
Forty-five of Sterne's sermons have been published. Two were published as pamphlets shortly after their delivery while Sterne was an obscure rural clergyman, in 1747 and 1750. The others were written for a local audience of parishioners in Yorkshire over the course of a long clerical career, and then revised after the fact, possibly in some haste, to capitalize on his success as a novelist. These collected sermons were published in three installments across seven volumes: volumes I and II in 1760, volumes III and IV in 1766, and volumes V, VI, and VII posthumously in 1769.

=== Individual sermons ===
Sterne's first known publication is the sermon "The Case of Elijah and the Widow of Zerephath, consider'd", which was published as a pamphlet in 1747. It was first preached as a charitable fund-raiser at St Michael le Belfrey, York on Good Friday of that year, successfully raising £64. The publication, printed in York and sold there and in London for six pence, was less successful; Sterne later wrote that it "was read by very few." It was also included as the fifth sermon in his first book collection.

Three years later, he published a second pamphlet containing the sermon "Abuses of Conscience". The sermon was preached at York Minster on 29 July 1750 and published two weeks later; Sterne later wrote that it too "could find neither readers nor purchasers". It also appeared in his novel Tristram Shandy and his second book collection.

=== The Sermons of Mr. Yorick, 1760 ===
A collection of Sterne's sermons was published after he achieved fame with his comic novel Tristram Shandy, which was first published at Sterne's expense in December 1759. Within the novel, a character reads Sterne's previously published sermon "Abuses of Conscience" (attributed to Mr. Yorick, an autobiographical self-insert character of Sterne) with comic interruptions and running commentary. Sterne uses the typographical conventions of theatre to mark the characters' discussion of the sermon like the asides of stage characters; their small drama eventually takes up more of the page than the sermon. Sterne included a note: "in case the character of parson Yorick, and this sample of his sermons is liked [...] there are now in the possession of the Shandy Family, as many as will make the world a handsome volume, at the world's service,--and much good may they do it." The novel and its sermon were both immediately popular; the author Horace Walpole wrote in one of his letters that "nothing is talked of, nothing admired" but Tristram Shandy, and "[t]he best thing in it is a sermon".

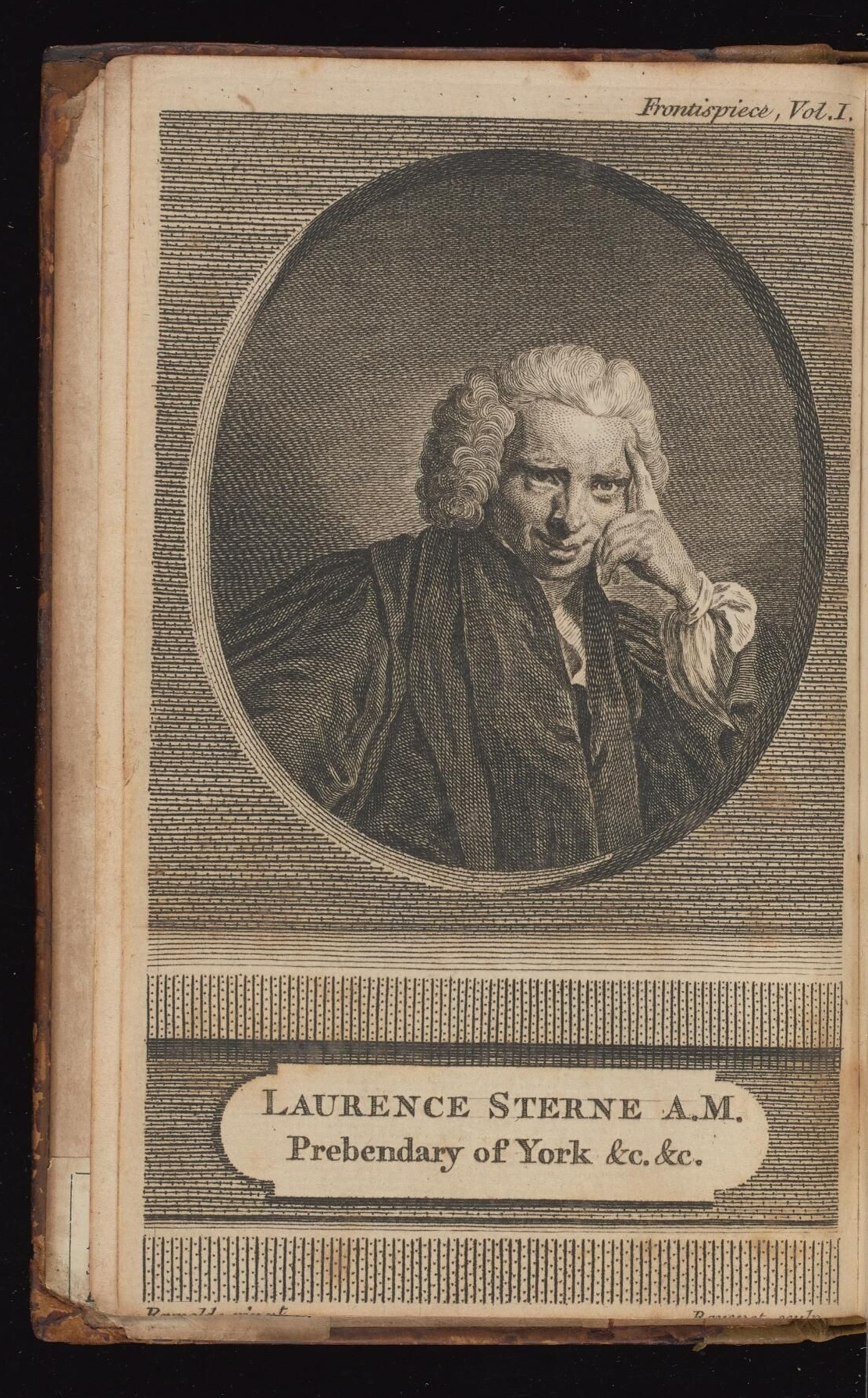
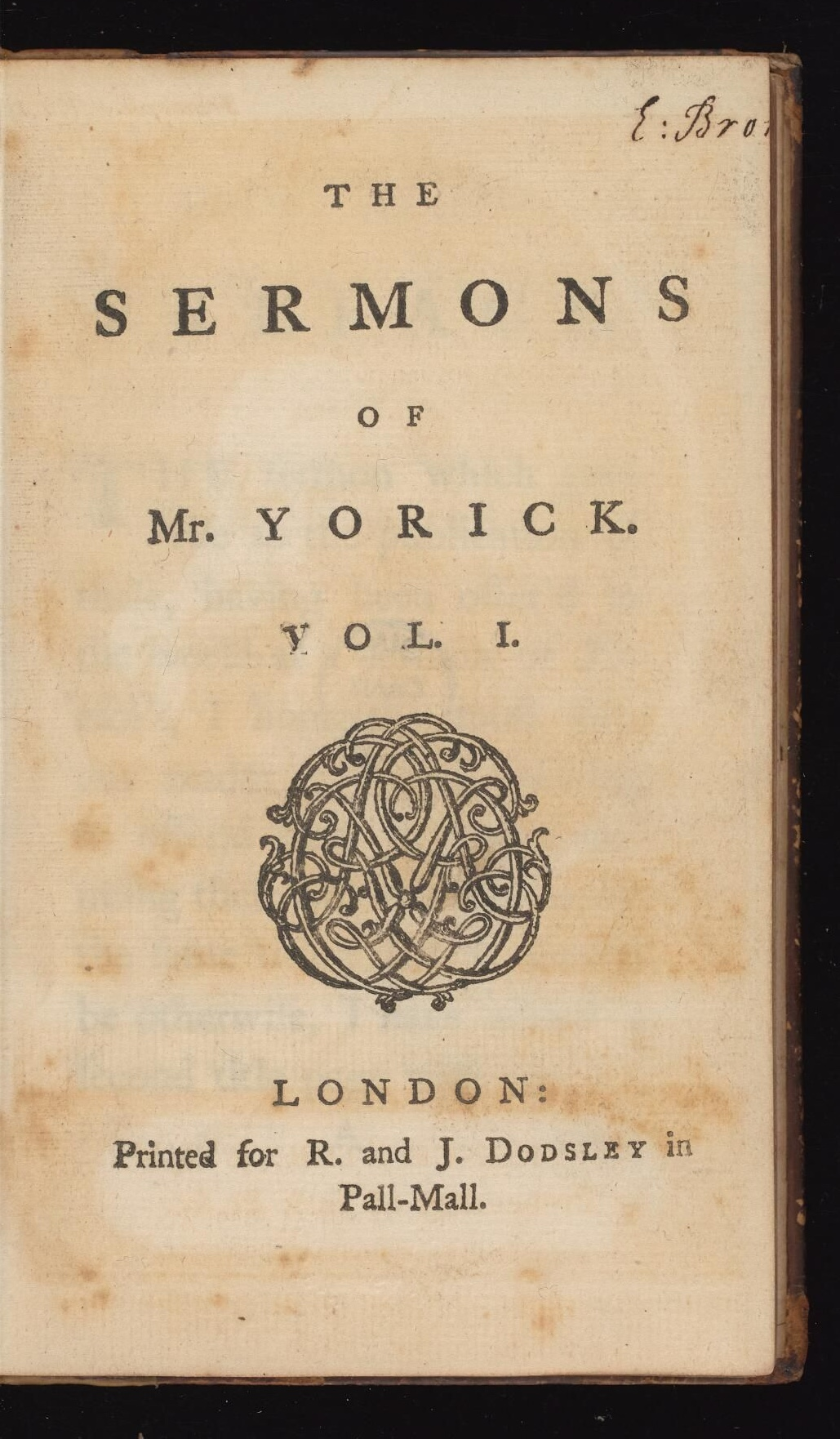
Frontispiece and title page of 1760 sermons

In March 1760, Sterne travelled to London, where he sold the copyright to the novel to Robert Dodsley for the substantial sum of £250. (Note: For context, Sterne's annual salary as the vicar of Sutton-on-the-Forest was only around £80.) He brought several sermons with him, which Dodsley purchased for £190. The sermon publication was also financed by subscriptions paid directly to Sterne, with more than 660 subscribers listed in the book. He advertised the forthcoming sermons with the title Dramatick Sermons of Mr. Yorick, but his publishers persuaded him to drop the "Dramatick" adjective, which implied too much analogy between the church and the theatre. Sterne was painted by the celebrity portraitist Joshua Reynolds; the resulting Portrait of Laurence Sterne, which depicts Sterne in clerical robes with his elbow on a manuscript of Tristram Shandy, was likely designed for its use as a frontispiece engraving in the Sermons, and Sterne advertised the forthcoming volume as being "ornamented by Reynolds".

The Sermons of Mr. Yorick was published on May 22, 1760, a two-volume collection of fifteen sermons. The publication of these sermons made the general public aware for the first time that the author of the raunchy comic novel Tristram Shandy was a clergyman. The title page lists the sermons as "by Mr. Yorick", while Sterne is identified with his religious titles in the frontispiece and in a half-title after the preface and subscriber list. The attribution to Yorick was considered provocative, since it tied the sermons to the novel.

=== The Sermons of Mr. Yorick, 1766 ===
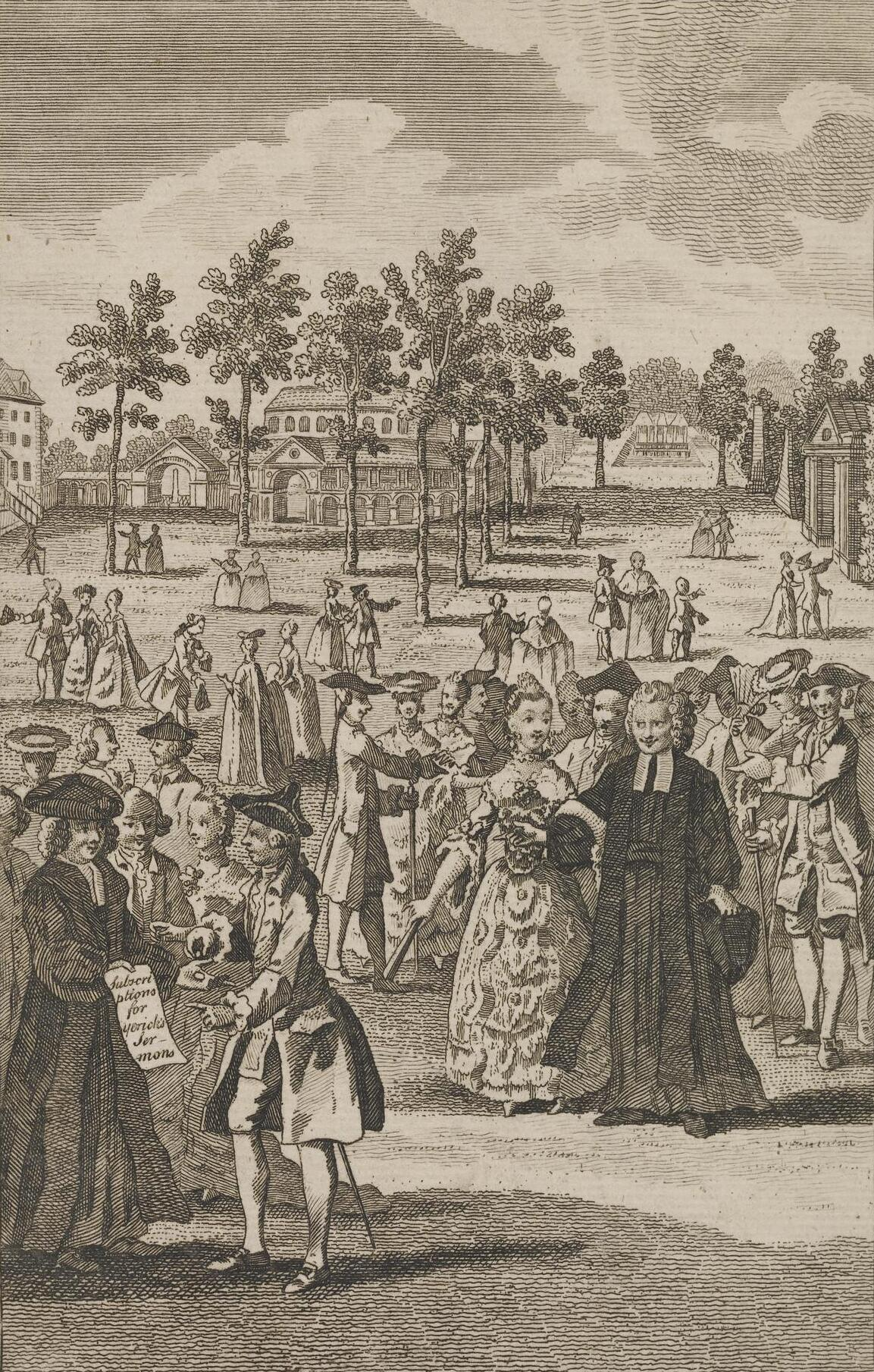
Satirical print of Laurence Sterne (clergyman on left) collecting subscriptions for his sermons from the fashionable society in Ranelagh Gardens

Twelve additional sermons were published in early 1766. Sterne began planning the book in March 1763, and collected subscriptions for it in 1765 while writing. The subscribers included the French writers Voltaire and Diderot. It was published as volumes III and IV of The Sermons of Mr. Yorick on January 18, 1766 by the booksellers Becket and Dehondt, who became the primary publishers of Sterne's work after Dodsley's death in 1764. The two-volume book contains twelve sermons.

The sermons in this collection were more carefully revised for publication than the first two volumes. Three had been preached recently; the others were likely composed and preached many years before. It is not possible to date when each sermon was first written and delivered, or when Sterne modified them over the course of his clerical career; New says that "Sterne worked over existing manuscripts and fragments in a rather desultory fashion, combining and recombining elements from a larger body of written documents than has survived and, perhaps, from an extensive commonplace book as well." The collection ends with "The Abuses of Conscience Considered", which was first published in 1750 and also appeared in volume two of Tristram Shandy.

=== Sermons by the Late Rev. Mr. Sterne, 1769 ===
The final collection of Sterne's sermons was published posthumously, edited by his daughter Lydia and his friend John Hall-Stevenson. The three-volume book was financially supported by more than 700 subscribers, and published by Becket, William Strahan, and Thomas Cadell. Lydia Sterne received a considerable sum for the book's copyright, likely close to the £400 Becket offered her. The collection includes eighteen new sermons.

== Style ==
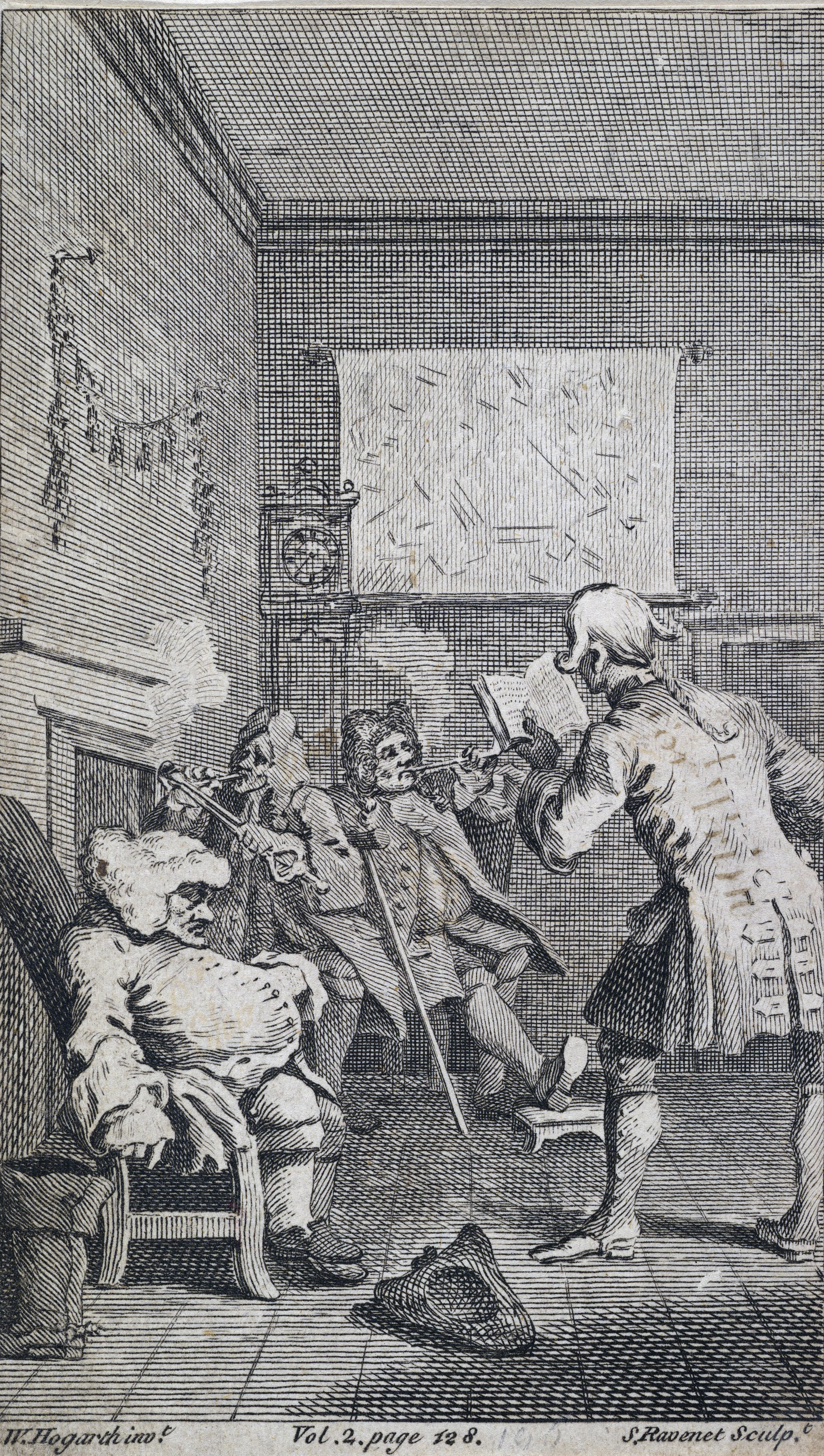
Illustration by William Hogarth of a scene in Tristram Shandy, in which Corporal Trim reads aloud from Sterne's sermon, "On the Abuses of Conscience"

=== Similarity to his humour writing ===
In the eighteenth century Sterne was known foremost for his humour, and his first readers saw a similar style in his sermons. The Monthly Review complained about the "air of levity in them", and the Critical Review wrote: "The author of Tristram Shandy is discernible in every page of these discourses. [...] the same acute remarks on the manners of mankind, the same striking characters, the same accurate investigation of the passions, the same delicate strokes of satire, and the same art of moving the tender affections of nature." The poet Thomas Gray wrote in a letter: "They are in the style I think most proper for the pulpit, & show a strong imagination & sensible heart: but you see him often tottering on the verge of laughter, & ready to throw his perriwig in the face of his audience." All of the sermons were published in octavo format, an unusually small size for a book of sermons, more common for light fiction; this size matches that of Tristram Shandy, and may have been intended to encourage readers' connections between those texts.

In contrast, the Sterne scholar Melvyn New asserts that "Sterne was neither an entertainer nor a comedian nor a humorist when he ascended the pulpit." He observes that only six of the forty-five sermons open with a joke, and all of them become entirely serious after the opening. The literary critic Jack Lynch argues that the primary similarity between Sterne's sermons and his fiction is the sermons' use of invented soliloquies and novelistic descriptions of Biblical figures' inner feelings.

=== Borrowings from other texts ===
A key characteristic of Sterne's sermons is their re-use of passages of text which were first written by other authors. This re-use has been characterized as plagiarism by Sterne's critics, though historians today see Sterne's textual borrowings as an uncontroversial part of eighteenth-century sermon-writing. Priests were often advised to preach from existing high-quality sermons rather than write new ones, and heavily borrowing material from established sermons was seen as a way to avoid theological errors. The scholar Melvyn New argues that "Sterne did not believe a good sermon came from the play of imagination or even from ratiocination but rather from his capacity to gather and organize for his flock the best that had already been expressed on any subject." Sterne's sermons habitually re-combine passages and examples from multiple sources.

Although substantial unacknowledged re-use of others' writing was commonplace in oral sermons, printed sermons were generally expected to rewrite or cite their borrowings. Sterne's preface to the 1760 sermon collection includes an apology for any extended quotations which were published without attribution:

the reader, upon old and beaten subjects, must not look for many new thoughts,—'tis well if he has new language; in three or four passages, where he has neither the one nor the other, I have quoted the author I made free with—there are some other passages, where I suspect I may have taken the same liberty,—but 'tis only suspicion, for I do not remember it is so, otherwise I should have restored them to their proper owners

New suggests that Sterne's borrowings differ from those in other extant sermons because Sterne's sermons were adapted for print on a short timeline, and "the method of composition by consultation with the traditional discourse has not been sufficiently accounted for or concealed."

== Influences ==
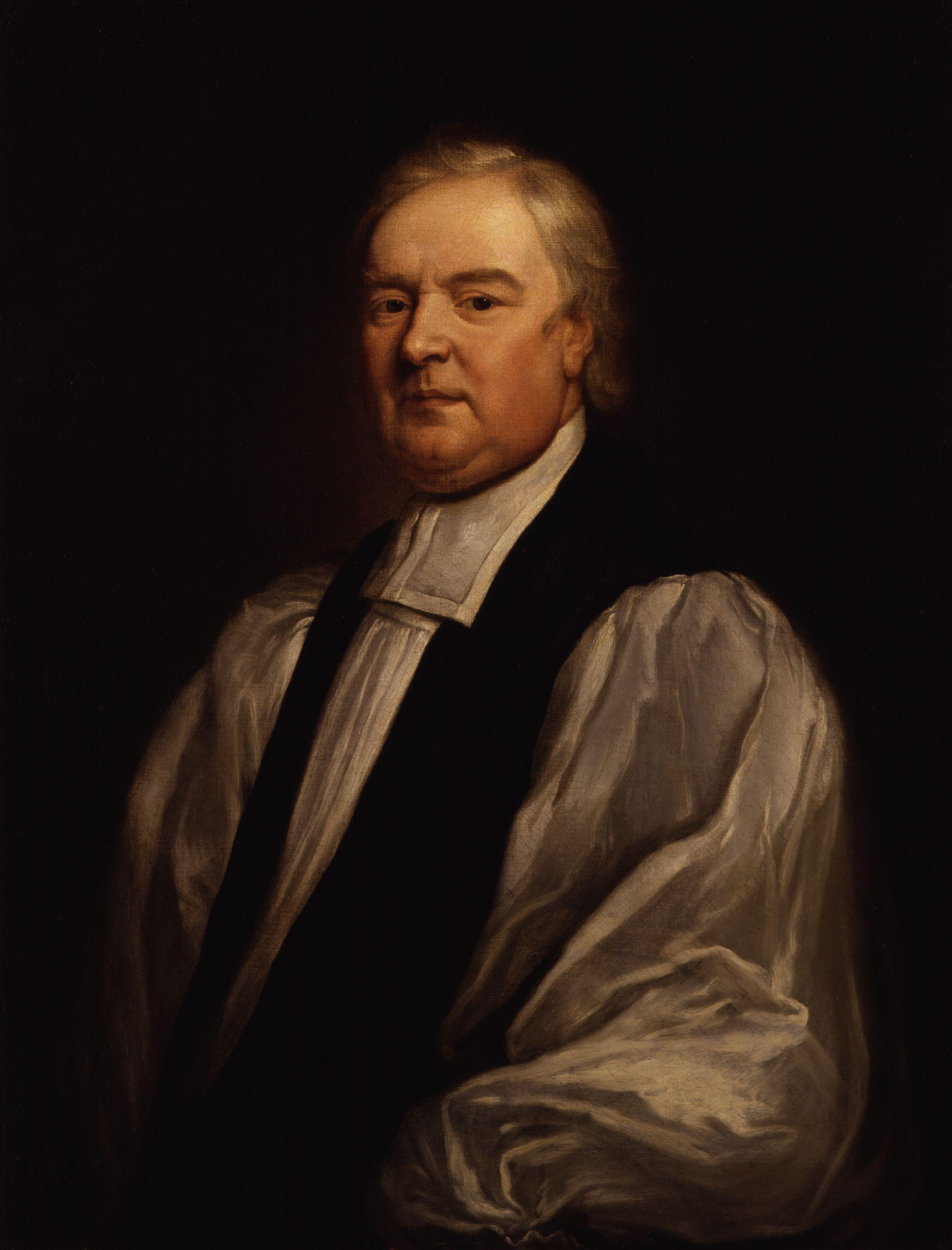
Sterne's sermons often borrow from John Tillotson, Archbishop of Canterbury from 1691 to 1694.

Sterne borrowed most frequently from John Tillotson, an Archbishop of Canterbury at the end of the seventeenth century whose collected sermons were widely influential among Anglican clergy. Tillotson, Samuel Clarke, and Joseph Butler were part of a new movement within English theology, focused on preaching "practical divinity" rather than taking sides in complex learned debates on doctrinal issues; Sterne followed their lead, alongside figures like John Sharp, Edward Stillingfleet, John Wilkins, and William Wollaston. Another major influence was Joseph Hall, a bishop whose sermons on the Old Testament were widely reprinted in Sterne's day. Sterne often borrowed from Hall's "dramatic and emotional renditions" of Biblical stories when narrativizing a Bible passage. Sterne's subject matter, style, and tone are also influenced by the sermons of traditional and now-obscure theologians like Lewis Atterbury, James Foster, Thomas Herring, Josiah Hort, Valentine Nalson, and Jeremiah Seed.

Less expectedly, Sterne also re-uses extended passages from the sermons of John Norris, a Cambridge Platonist whose mysticism and intellectualism conflict with Sterne's goal of "practical divinity". Melvyn New argues that Sterne shares with Norris a common theme regarding "the necessity of an earthly, sensate preparation for Heaven", and specifically that "there must be a reformation of sensual pleasures here in order to enjoy Heaven hereafter".

A non-sermon influence is John Dunton's 1707 poem The Pulpit Fool. Dunton and Sterne share a latitudinarian approach to religious practice, and an emphasis on preaching "to the heart" rather than delivering complex and ostentatiously learned sermons.

== Reception ==
=== Eighteenth century ===
Sterne's initial pamphlet publications made little impression, but his later book collections were popular and financially successful, reprinted even more frequently than his novels. A poem by James Boswell describes the sermons as highly fashionable: "On Sterne's discourses we grew mad [...] A strange enthusiastic rage / for sacred text now seis'd the age. / Around St. James' every table / was partly gay and partly sable." Another poem, published in The Anti-Times, highlighted the wide audience attracted to the sermons: "Rakes, bucks, bloods, and ev'n girls of night, / Conn'd Yorick's pages o'er with vast delight: / The courtiers, statesmen, beaus, and men of trade, / All read the sermons, which poor Y-rick made". The first sermon collection in 1760 sold out and was followed by a second edition only two months later. The second collection in 1766 was slightly less successful, as interest in Sterne's ongoing novel had waned. The third collection, published posthumously, sold out and was re-issued within the year. Each collection was published with an extensive list of names of supporters who funded its publication by subscription, including many of society's elite.

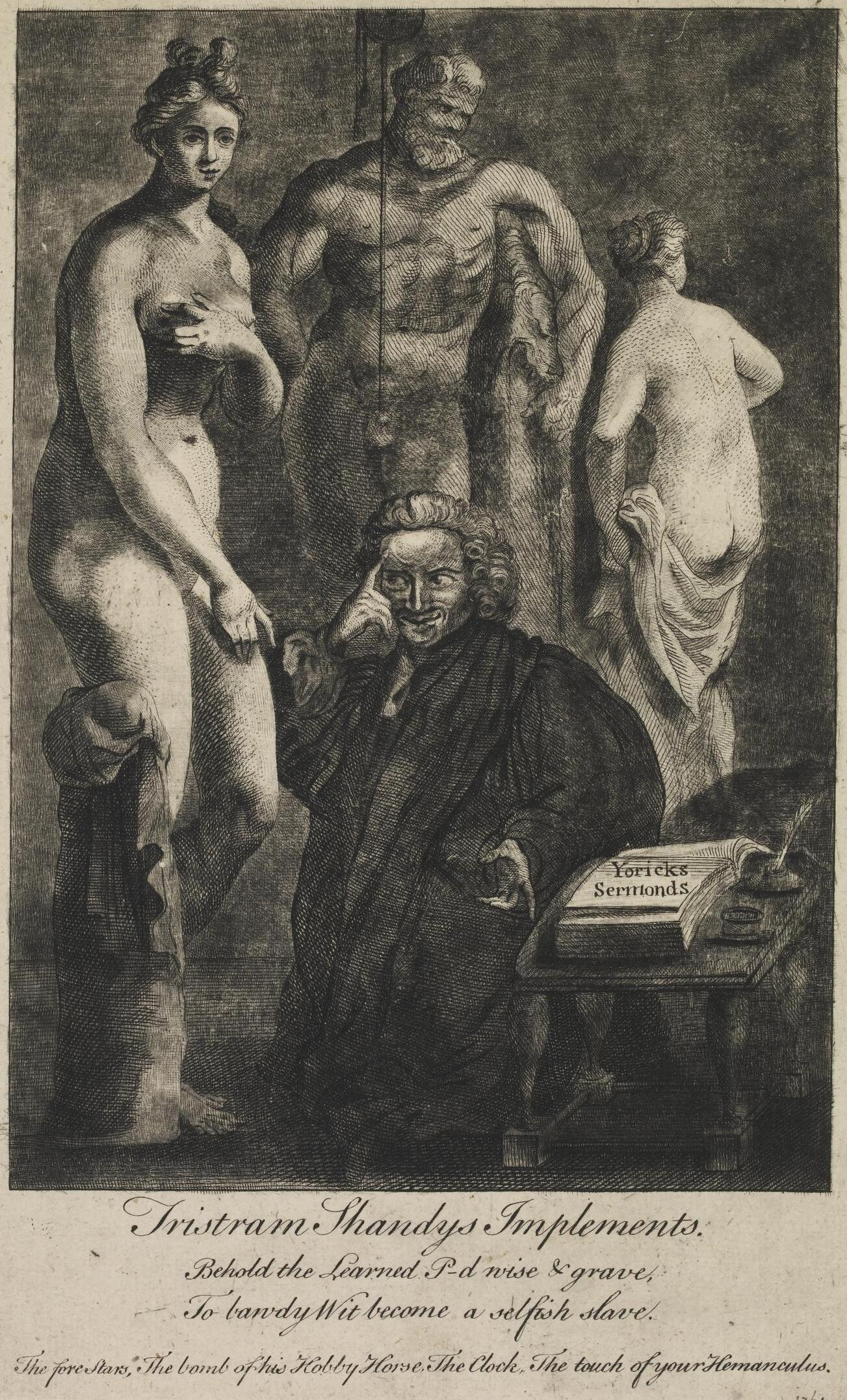
Satirical print of Sterne with his sermons, captioned: "Behold the Learned P-d wise and grave, To bawdy Wit become a selfish slave."

At the same time, readers wrestled with the contradictions between Sterne's reputation as a bawdy humourist and the moral purity expected from a clergyman. Tristram Shandy made him famous enough to create a market for his sermons, but it also attracted substantial criticism for its sexual content. When the first sermon collection was published, the Critical Review specifically praised the contrast between it and Sterne's novel: "It is with pleasure that we behold this son of Comus descending from the chair of frolick, to inspire sentiments and piety". In the Monthly Review, Owen Ruffhead questioned the moral character of Sterne and his novel and complained "must the exordium to a sermon, be a smutty tale?" Reviewing the second collection for the Monthly Review, William Rose wrote: "Serious subjects, indeed, seem but little suited to Mr. Sterne's genius. [...] He is possessed, however, of such a fund of good humour [...] and seems, at the same time, to have so large a share of philanthropy, that it is impossible, for us at least, to be long displeased with him." The Critical Review also complained that "the author sometimes forgets the dignity of his character, and the solemnity of a christian congregation", and the author Sarah Scott wrote in her letters that she found the sermons offensively cavalier. One reviewer in 1767 wrote, "we are astonished a man can deliver such sentiments, and act such a life!"

=== Later reception ===
As religious writing grew less popular, especially among literary historians, interest in Sterne's sermons declined substantially. In 1930, the scholar Herbert Read complained that "no one seems to have bothered to read the Sermons" after "their first success". The only monograph on the sermons is Lansing Van Der Heyden Hammond's 1948 book Laurence Sterne's "Sermons of Mr. Yorick". From the 1950s through the 1990s, Sterne's sermons were primarily read by literary scholars who studied them as part of their analysis of Sterne's novels. Arthur H. Cash's 1966 monograph Sterne's Comedy of Moral Sentiments: The Ethical Dimension of the "Journey" influentially studied the sermons as a "gloss" to A Sentimental Journey. The Sterne scholar Melvyn New published an authoritative scholarly edition of the sermons in 1996, as volumes four and five of the Florida Edition of Sterne's collected works. In this edition, New complained that in most cases "the sermons are still consulted only as they might provide oats for one's hobby-horse, that is, for one's reading of Sterne's fiction." The sermons continued to be overshadowed by Sterne's fiction in scholarship and classroom teaching. The literary historian Jack Lynch argues that they are neglected in part because literary scholars are not trained in theology. James Sladen Gow attributes the neglect to the persistent assumption that Sterne's sermons are either plagiarized or immoral. Today, Sterne's sermons have never been out of print, but they are no longer as widely read or studied.
