= List of acts of the Parliament of Scotland from 1704 =

This is a list of acts of the Parliament of Scotland for the year 1704.

It lists acts of Parliament of the old Parliament of Scotland, that was merged with the old Parliament of England to form the Parliament of Great Britain, by the Union with England Act 1707 (c. 7).

For other years, see list of acts of the Parliament of Scotland. For the period after 1707, see list of acts of the Parliament of Great Britain.

== 1704 ==
The 2nd session of the parliament of Anne, held in Edinburgh from 6 July 1704 until 26 August 1704.

Short title, or popular name	Citation	Royal assent
Long title
Adjournment of Session Act 1704 (repealed)	1704 c. 1 (Note: This is the citation in the Record Edition.); 1704 c. 1 (Note: This is the citation in the Duodecimal Edition.)	13 July 1704
Act Adjourning the Session. (Repealed by Statute Law Revision (Scotland) Act 1906 (6 Edw. 7. c. 38))
Not public and general	1704 c. 2; 1704 c. 2	5 August 1704
Act of Dissolution of the few duties of Bute and other rents allocat to the keeping of the Castle of Dumbartoun and the Constabulary thereof in favors of the Marquess of Montrose.
Act of Security 1704 (repealed)	1704 c. 3; 1704 c. 3	5 August 1704
Act for the Security of the Kingdom. (Repealed by Repeal of Certain Scotch Acts 1707 (6 Ann. c. 36))
Supply Act 1704 (repealed)	1704 c. 4; 1704 c. 4	5 August 1704
Act anent the Supply of Six Moneths Cess upon the Land Rent. (Repealed by Statute Law Revision (Scotland) Act 1906 (6 Edw. 7. c. 38))
Commissioners of Justiciary Act 1704 (repealed)	1704 c. 5; 1704 c. 5	25 August 1704
Act in favors of the Five Lords Commissioners of the Justiciary. (Repealed by Statute Law Revision (Scotland) Act 1906 (6 Edw. 7. c. 38))
Export of Wool Act 1704 (repealed)	1704 c. 6; 1704 c. 6	25 August 1704
Act allowing the Exportation of Wool, &c. (Repealed by Statute Law Revision (Scotland) Act 1906 (6 Edw. 7. c. 38))
Public Accounts Act 1704 (repealed)	1704 c. 7; 1704 c. 7	25 August 1704
Act continuing the Commission for the Publick Accounts. (Repealed by Statute Law Revision (Scotland) Act 1906 (6 Edw. 7. c. 38))
Not public and general	1704 c. 8 — (Note: This act is not listed in the Duodecimal Edition.)	26 August 1704
Ratification in favors of Patrick Earl of Marchmont and Patrick Lord Polwarth his son of the Barony of Marchmont.
Duty on Foreign Shipping Act 1704 (repealed)	1704 c. 9; 1704 c. 8	26 August 1704
Act for an Imposition on Foreign Ships that come into this Kingdom for bearing the charges of finishing the Maps and description of the Sea coasts and Isles &c. (Repealed by Statute Law Revision (Scotland) Act 1906 (6 Edw. 7. c. 38))

- Act for the additional representation of barons

=== Sources ===
- Alexander, William (1841). "Acta Parliamentorum Annæ". An Abridgement of the Acts of the Parliaments of Scotland. Edinburgh: Adam and Charles Black. p. 521 – via Google Books.
- Alexander, William (1841). "Acta Parliamentorum Annæ". An Abridgement of the Acts of the Parliaments of Scotland. Edinburgh: Adam and Charles Black. p. 521 – via Google Books.
- Chronological Table of the Statutes. London: Her Majesty's Stationery Office. 1972. p. 1367 – via Google Books.
- "Index of Statutes: Anne (1702-1707)". Records of the Parliaments of Scotland to 1707. University of St Andrews.

== See also ==
- List of legislation in the United Kingdom
- Records of the Parliaments of Scotland
