= Wine Act 1703 =

1703 Act of the pre-Union Parliament of Scotland

- Act of Parliament
- Parliament of Scotland
- Long title: Act allowing the Importation of Wines and other Foreign Liquors.
- Citation: 1703 c. 13

Dates
- Royal assent: 16 September 1703

Other legislation
- Repealed by: Statute Law Revision (Scotland) Act 1906

Status: Repealed

The Wine Act 1703 (c. 13) was an act enacted by the Parliament of Scotland in 1703.

At a time when England and France were locked in the War of the Spanish Succession, the act allowed Scots to legally import French wines. It caused anger in England, because it allowed Scottish traders to openly support that nation's greatest enemy (at the time). The Act itself was part of a raft of legislation, all in direct opposition to English commercial and political interest, that was forced through by a majority opposition in the Scottish Parliament in 1703. Other legislation included the Peace and War Act 1703 (c. 6) (S)), and the Act of Security 1704 (c.3 (S)) (which was given royal assent the following year).
