= Portrait of Laurence Sterne =

Painting by Joshua Reynolds

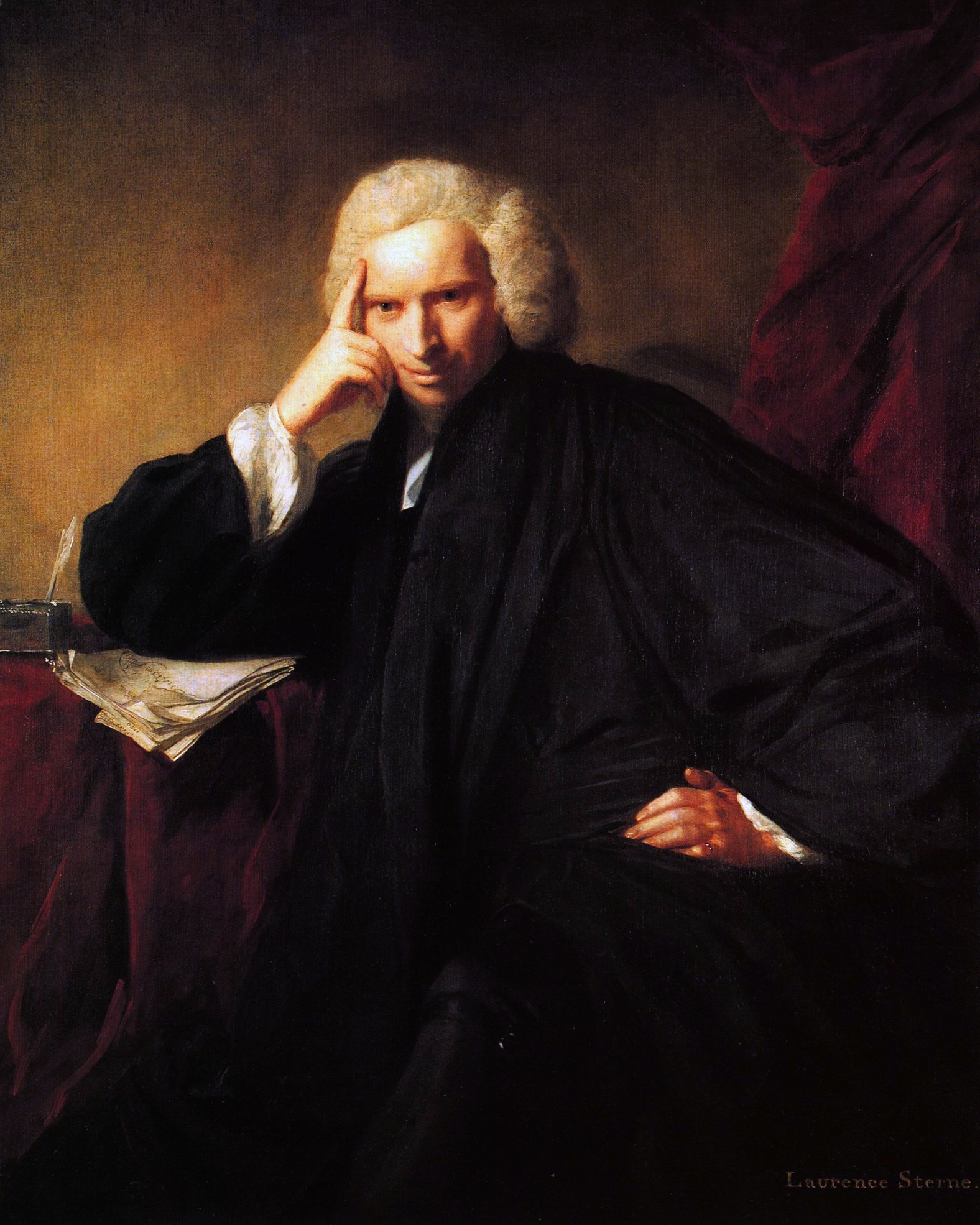
- Artist: Joshua Reynolds
- Year: 1760
- Type: Oil on canvas, portrait painting
- Dimensions: 127.3 cm × 100.3 cm (50.1 in × 39.5 in)
- Location: National Portrait Gallery; London

Portrait of Laurence Sterne is a 1760 portrait painting by the British artist Joshua Reynolds depicting Laurence Sterne, an Anglo-Irish writer and Church of England clergyman. Reynolds was a friend of Sterne's, and shows him dressed in a Geneva gown with his elbow resting on a manuscript of his new novel Tristram Shandy.

At the time, Sterne had just become a literary celebrity for his new novel Tristram Shandy, published in December 1759. The portrait was painted during Sterne's visit to London from March to May 1760, during which he promoted his novel and arranged the publication of a volume of sermons. The book historian Helen Williams argues that the portrait was likely designed for its use as a frontispiece in the sermon collection, which was published on May 22, 1760. A mezzotint was produced based on the picture shortly after its creation, and Sterne advertised his forthcoming sermon collection as being "ornamented by Reynolds".

Reynolds was rapidly establishing himself as Britain's leading portraitist. At the end of the decade he was elected the first President of the Royal Academy. He displayed the painting of Sterne at the Exhibition of 1761 held by the Society of Artists of Great Britain in Pall Mall and again at a special exhibition held in 1768 to commemorate the visit of Christian VII of Denmark. It was later exhibited at the British Institution in 1813. Today the painting is in the collection of the National Portrait Gallery, having been acquired in 1975.

== Bibliography ==
- McIntyre, Ian. Joshua Reynolds: The Life and Times of the First President of the Royal Academy. Allen Lane, 2003.
- Postle, Edward (ed.) Joshua Reynolds: The Creation of Celebrity. Harry N. Abrams, 2005.
- Williams, Helen (2021). Laurence Sterne and the Eighteenth-Century Book. Cambridge University Press. doi:10.1017/9781108904162. ISBN 978-1-108-90416-2.
