= Publication by subscription =

Book publishing method

From the late 16th to the 18th centuries, books were published by subscription in English-speaking areas including Britain, Ireland, and British America. Subscriptions were an alternative to the prevailing mode of publication, whereby booksellers would buy authors' manuscripts outright and produce and sell books on their own initiative. The subscription model was not common and books published using the model were often about specialist subjects. Contemporaries sometimes considered subscription unseemly.

== Background ==
In the late 16th and 17th centuries in England, businesses including insurance enterprises and trading companies such as the East India and Hudson's Bay companies operated on a subscription basis. Some lectures were also funded by subscription.

Writers who did not organize subscriptions would usually sell their manuscripts at low prices to booksellers, who would then produce and distribute the printed book. Selling the manuscript meant abandoning any legal rights to the literary work the writer might have, such as copyright or moral rights. According to the literary scholar George Justice, subscription was a descendant of patronage, whereby writers would depend on the financial support of a single person to produce literature. W. A. Speck describes it as a "half-way house" between patronage and selling a book on the market.

== Subscription model ==
Publication by subscription took the following form. A writer or bookseller promised to produce a book with certain specifications. Subscribers promised to pay for the book's production. In turn, they would each receive a copy. Subscribers typically paid half in advance and half on delivery of the new book. Their names would be listed in the frontmatter of the edition for which they subscribed. A subscriber could pay more to receive a book printed on better paper or to have their coat of arms included.

Subscribers did not always pay the same amount and had different jobs. "Benefactors" paid out more than they received in books; "undertakers" took on production and distribution responsibilities. Undertakers also marketed the book to new potential subscribers, sometimes using a "proposal" or "prospectus" which might give the customer a sample of what the finished product would look like, or otherwise simply advertised it. Proposals could be trial balloons, used to see whether there was sufficient interest to produce a book in the first place; they occasionally included qualifiers stating that a book would be produced only if a certain number of subscribers signed up. Some subscription agreements assigned earnings from the book to the bookseller, not the author or subscribers.

It was difficult for lesser-known authors to find enough subscribers. The historian Joseph Morgan included an "Essay on the comi-tragical history of subscription hunting" in the first volume of his Complete History of Algiers (1728) in which he describes the search for subscribers as an "abject vocation".

By the 18th century, contemporary commentators began to see subscription as, in the terms of scholar Thomas Lockwood, "merely a respectable kind of scam". Ephraim Chambers's Cyclopædia, or an Universal Dictionary of Arts and Sciences (1728) says that subscription was "liable to some Abuses"; the protagonist of Richard Savage's An Author to be Lett (1729) says he "printed Proposals for a Subscription to my Works, received Money, and gave Receipts without any Intention of delivering the Book."

== Production ==
The first book known to have been published by subscription was Ductor in linguas or The Guide into the Tongues by John Minsheu (1617). Minsheu's Guide was an expensive book to publish: it ran to 726 folios and included text in unusual typefaces. Minsheu financed his subscription by fundraising at the Inns of Court and procuring loans from people including Henry Spelman and Henry Briggs. To advertise the Guide, he got affiliates of the University of Oxford, among others, to sign certificates attesting to its quality.

In a 1931 article, literary historian Sarah Lewis Carol Clapp reported that she had discovered 87 books published by subscription. Subscription was not common: in its heyday, from about 1720 to 1750, subscriptions financed about 5 percent of books published in Britain. Speck reports, however, that about 2,000 subscription lists, containing about 1 million names, survive. (Speck does not say how many duplicates are among the lists or names.) Books published by subscription tended to be about antiquarian scholarship and topography.

Subscribed-for books include an edition of Paradise Lost published by Jacob Tonson in 1688 and (according to Samuel Johnson) John Dryden's The Works of Virgil. Dryden's Virgil is sometimes cited as the first book published by subscription, instead of Minsheu's Guide. It was produced in two editions, one with a higher subscription fee for an "exclusive limited edition". Alexander Pope raised around £10,000 by subscription for translations of the Iliad and Odyssey he wrote in the 1710s and 1720s. Frances Burney published Camilla (1796) by subscription and initially wrestled with the idea, considering the method a form of charity. Camilla's list of subscribers runs to 1,033 names including Ann Radcliffe, Maria Edgeworth, and Jane Austen.

Subscription projects had some reach outside the island of Britain. George Faulkner used booksellers in London as subscription agents and Dublin booksellers collected subscriptions for English publications. Books were published in the colonies of British America from at least 1726. In the 1790s, some American booksellers subscribed for Irish books.

== See also ==
- Text publication society

== Sources ==
- Barnard, John (September 1998). "The Large- and Small-Paper Copies of Dryden's The Works of Virgil (1697): Jacob Tonson's Investment and Profits and the Example of Paradise Lost (1688)". The Papers of the Bibliographical Society of America. 92 (3): 259–271. doi:10.1086/pbsa.92.3.24304447. ISSN 0006-128X. JSTOR 24304447. S2CID 159742090.
- Clapp, Sarah L. C. (November 1931). "The Beginnings of Subscription Publication in the Seventeenth Century". Modern Philology. 29 (2): 199–224. doi:10.1086/387957. ISSN 0026-8232. S2CID 162013335.
- Feather, J. P. (1976). Book Prospectuses before 1801 in the John Johnson Collection: A Catalogue with Microfiches. Oxford: Oxford Microform Publications; Bodleian Library. ISBN 978-0-904735-15-4. OCLC 2712305.
- Fleeman, J. D. (1985). "Johnsonian Prospectuses and Proposals". In Patey, Douglas Lane; Keegan, Timothy (eds.). Augustan Studies: Essays in Honor of Irvin Ehrenpreis. University of Delaware Press. pp. 215–238. ISBN 978-0-87413-272-4. OCLC 12163162.
- Justice, George (2002). The Manufacturers of Literature: Writing and the Literary Marketplace in Eighteenth-Century England. University of Delaware Press. ISBN 978-0-585-43913-6. OCLC 51567007.
- Lockwood, Thomas (2001). "Subscription-hunters and their prey". Studies in the Literary Imagination. 34 (1): 121–135. ISSN 0039-3819. ProQuest 198092729.
- Pink, Emma E. (2006). "Frances Burney's Camilla: "To Print My Grand Work ... by Subscription"". Eighteenth-Century Studies. 40 (1): 51–68. doi:10.1353/ecs.2006.0046. ISSN 0013-2586. JSTOR 30053491. S2CID 143946008.
- Pollard, Mary (1989). Dublin's Trade in Books, 1550–1800. Oxford University Press. ISBN 978-0-19-818409-6. OCLC 19125567.
- Powell, William S. (1962). "Patrons of the Press: Subscription Book Purchases in North Carolina, 1733–1850". The North Carolina Historical Review. 39 (4): 423–499. ISSN 0029-2494. JSTOR 23517396.
- Raven, James (2005). "Publishing and bookselling 1660–1780". In Richetti, John (ed.). The Cambridge History of English Literature, 1660–1780. Cambridge University Press. pp. 13–36. doi:10.1017/chol9780521781442.003. ISBN 978-0-521-78144-2.
- Speck, W. A. (1982). "Politicians, Peers, and Publication by Subscription 1700–50". In Rivers, Isabel (ed.). Books and Their Readers in Eighteenth-Century England. Leicester University Press; St. Martin's Press. pp. 47–68. ISBN 978-0-312-09248-1. OCLC 8552837.
- Williams, Franklin B. Jr. (1948). "Scholarly Publication in Shakespeare's Day: A Leading Case". In McManaway, James Gilmer; Dawson, Giles E.; Willougby, Edwin E. (eds.). Joseph Quincy Adams Memorial Studies. Washington, D.C.: Folger Shakespeare Library. pp. 755–773. OCLC 1150079270.
