= Act for the additional representation of barons =

1704 Act of the pre-Union Parliament of Scotland

- Act of Parliament
- Parliament of Scotland
- Long title: Act for the additional representation of barons.

An Act for the additional representation of barons was legislation passed by the Parliament of Scotland in 1704.

The recent increase in creations of nobles in the Peerage of Scotland had reduced the influence of the barons and freeholders in the unicameral Parliament. To counter this, it was enacted that the numbers of commissioners for the shires of Edinburgh, Haddington, Berwick, Roxburgh, Lanark, Dumfries, Ayr, Perth, Aberdeen, Fife and Forfar, "being the most considerable shires of the kingdom", should be increased by one each, and that "for ever hereafter when a nobleman shall be created a baron shall be added to the representation of the shires".
