= Lewis Atterbury the elder =

English clergyman and writer (died 1693)

Lewis Atterbury D.D., the elder (died 1693) was an English clergyman and writer.

== Life ==
He was the son of Francis Atterbury, rector of Middleton-Malsor, Northamptonshire. He became a student of Christ Church, Oxford in 1647; submitted to the authority of the visitors appointed by the parliament; took the degree of B.A. on 28 February 1649, and was created M.A. on 1 March 1651, by dispensation from Oliver Cromwell, at that time chancellor of the university. In 1654 he was made rector of Great or Broad Rissington in Gloucestershire, and in 1657 received the living of Middleton-Keynes, near Newport Pagnell, Bucks.

At the Restoration Atterbury took care to have his titles to these benefices confirmed by taking a presentation under the great seal. On 25 July 1660, he became chaplain to Henry, Duke of Gloucester, who died at the end of the year; and on 1 December 1660 he took the degree of D.D. He seems to have been, in his later years, involved in litigation, which necessitated his frequent attendance in town. On 7 December 1698, as he was returning home after one of his visits to London, he was drowned near Middleton-Keynes, and there buried.

== Works ==
Atterbury published the following sermons:

- A Good Subject, or the Right Test of Religion and Loyalty (on Prov. xxiv. 21, 22), 17 July 1684.
- The Grand Charter of Christian Feasts, with the right way of keeping them (on 1 Cor. v. 8), 30 November 1685.
- Babylon's Downfall, or England's Happy Deliverance from Popery and Slavery (on Revelation xviii. 2), preached at Guildhall Chapel on 28 June 1691, and published at the desire of the court of aldermen.

== Family ==
Atterbury married and left two sons: Lewis Atterbury the younger; and Francis Atterbury, Bishop of Rochester.
