= Lewis Atterbury (chaplain) =

Lewis Atterbury the younger LL.D., (1656–1731) was an English churchman, a royal chaplain to two monarchs.

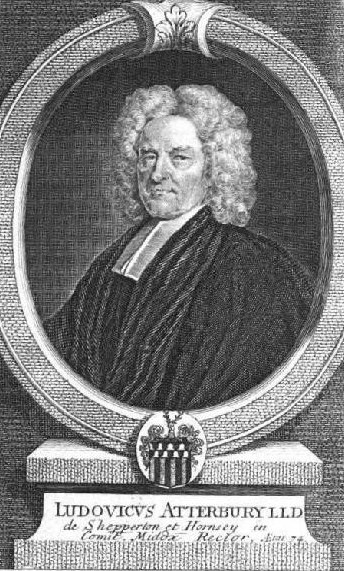
Lewis Atterbury, 1727 engraving by George Vertue after Thomas Gibson.

== Life ==
Atterbury was the eldest son of Lewis Atterbury the elder, and brother of Francis Atterbury. He was born in Caldecot, in the parish of Newport Pagnell, Buckinghamshire, on 2 May 1656. After being educated at Westminster School, under Richard Busby, he proceeded to Christ Church, Oxford, where he matriculated on 10 April 1674. He was ordained deacon by John Fell, Bishop of Oxford, on 21 September 1679, when he had already taken his bachelor's degree; and on 5 July 1680 he proceeded M.A., taking priest's orders on 25 September of the following year.

In 1683 he became chaplain to Sir William Pritchard, then lord mayor of London: and in February 1684 he was appointed rector of Sywell, Northamptonshire. On 8 July 1687 he took by accumulation the degrees of bachelor and doctor of civil law. He was appointed, in 1691, lecturer of St Mary Hill, London, and on 16 June 1695 he became preacher of Highgate Chapel, where he had already been officiating for some time previously, during the illness of his predecessor. Before this, he had been appointed one of the six chaplains to Princess Anne of Denmark at Whitehall and St James's, a position which he continued to hold after she came to the throne, and during part of the reign of George I.

On coming to live at Highgate, seeing the lack of affordable medical advice, he applied himself to the study of medicine, and used his knowledge for the free care of his parishioners. In 1707 he was presented by the queen to the rectory of Shepperton, in Middlesex, the incumbent being a non-juror; and in 1719 he was collated by the Bishop of London to the rectory of Hornsey, continuing to hold the office of preacher at Highgate. The archdeaconry of Rochester becoming vacant by the death of Thomas Sprat (1679–1720), Atterbury wrote to his younger brother, the bishop, applying for the post. Edward Yardley printed (in the preface to Atterbury's Sermons, 1743) the correspondence that passed on the subject, in which the request was refused.

== Death and legacy ==
At the age of seventy, up to which time he had enjoyed good health, he suffered an attack of the palsy and began to pay frequent visits to Bath, Somerset. Here he died 20 October 1731, in his seventy-sixth year. He was buried in Highgate Chapel. He left a collection of pamphlets, in some two hundred volumes, to the library of Christ Church, Oxford, and some books to the libraries at Bedford and Newport Pagnell. To his brother, the bishop, he left one hundred pounds; and the remainder of his property, first to his granddaughter (who survived him only a short time), and afterwards to his nephew Osborn, the bishop's son. He also left ten pounds a year for the support of a schoolmistress for girls at Newport Pagnell.

== Family ==
In 1688 he had married Penelope, sister of Sir Robert Bedingfield, lord mayor of London in 1707. Two of his sons died in infancy; a third, Bedingfield Atterbury, who was educated at Oxford, died in 1718: a married daughter died in 1725; and his wife in 1723.

== Works ==
A list of Atterbury's works is given in Yardley's preface to the Sermons, 1743. They include:

- The Penitent Lady, or Reflections on the Mercy of God, from the French of Madame de la Vallière, 1684.
- Ten Sermons preached before her Royal Highness the Princess Anne of Denmark, at the chapel of St. James's, 1699.
- Twelve Sermons preached at St. James's and Whitehall: dedicated to the Queen, 1703.
- Some Letters relating to the History of the Council of Trent, 1705.
- An Answer to a Popish Book intitled "A True and Modest Account of the Chief Points of Controversy between the Roman Catholics and the Protestants," &c., 1709.
- The Reunion of Christians; translated from the French, 1708.
- Sermons on Select Subjects; now published from the originals, two vols., 1743.
