= W. A. Speck =

British historian

William Arthur Speck (11 January 1938, Bradford – 15 February 2017, Carlisle) was a British historian who specialised in late 17th and 18th-century British and American history.

He was born in Bradford and was the son of a bookbinder. He was educated at Bradford Grammar School before winning a scholarship to The Queen's College, Oxford, where he gained a BA in 1960 and a D.Phil. in 1966.

He began his career in 1962, with a tutorial fellowship at the University of Exeter, before he moved to a lectureship in history at Newcastle University the following year. In 1974, he was promoted to a readership. He was appointed to the G. F. Grant Professorship of History at the University of Hull in 1981 and in 1984 he became the Chair in Modern History at the University of Leeds, retiring in 1997 to become Emeritus Professor of History.

Speck moved to Carlisle in order to be closer to the source material for his biography of Robert Southey, which was published by Yale University Press in 2006. The book was well reviewed and resulted in Speck being appointed Honorary Professor in the School of English Studies at the University of Nottingham, which he held from 2006 until 2012. Here, he co-convened an Interdisciplinary Eighteenth-Century Research Seminar. He was president of the Historical Association from 1999 to 2002. Speck was also chairman of the Carlisle branch of the RSPCA.

== Works ==
- (co-authored with Geoffrey Holmes), Divided Society: Parties and Politics in England, 1694–1716 (1967).
- Tory and Whig: The Struggle in the Constituencies 1701–1715 (Macmillan, 1970).
- Stability and Strife: England, 1714-60 (Edward Arnold, 1977).
- The Butcher: The Duke of Cumberland and the Suppression of the 45 (Blackwell, 1981; second edition, 2013).
- ‘Whigs and Tories dim their glories: English political parties under the first two Georges’, in John Cannon (ed.), The Whig Ascendancy: Colloquies on Hanoverian Britain (Edward Arnold, 1981), pp. 51–70.
- The Reluctant Revolutionaries: Englishmen and the Revolution of 1688 (Oxford University Press, 1988).
- The Birth of Britain: A New Nation, 1700–1715 (Oxford: Blackwell, 1994)
- Literature and Society in Eighteenth-Century England, 1680–1820: Ideology, Politics and Culture (Longman, 1998).
- Cassell's Companion to Eighteenth-Century Britain (Cassell, 2002).
- James II (Longman, 2002).
- Colonial America: From Jamestown to Yorktown (Palgrave, 2002).
- A Concise History of Britain: 1707–1975 (1993).
- Robert Southey. Entire Man of Letters (2006).
- Dictionary of British America, 1584–1783 (Palgrave, 2007).
- A Political Biography of Thomas Paine (Routledge, 2016).
