= Repeal of Certain Scotch Acts 1707 =

Act of the Parliament of Great Britain following the Union of 1707

- Act of Parliament
- Parliament of Great Britain
- Long title: An Act for repealing and declaring the determination of two acts passed in the parliament of Scotland; the one intituled, An Act for the security of the kingdom; the other, Act anent peace and war.
- Citation: 6 Ann. c. 36 (Note: This is the citation in The Statutes of the Realm); 6 Ann. c. 2 (Note: This is the citation in The Statutes at Large)
- Territorial extent: Great Britain

Dates
- Royal assent: 18 December 1707
- Commencement: 23 October 1707 (Note: Start of session.)
- Repealed: 15 July 1867

Other legislation
- Repeals/revokes: Peace and War Act 1703; Act of Security 1704
- Repealed by: Statute Law Revision Act 1867
- Relates to: Acts of Union 1707

Status: Repealed

Text of statute as originally enacted

The Repeal of Certain Scottish Acts (6 Ann. c. 36) was an act of the Parliament of Great Britain that repealed of several acts originating in the Scottish and English parliaments, supplementing the Acts of Union 1707.

The acts repealed included the Act of Security 1704 (c.3 (S)) and the Peace and War Act 1703 (c. 6) (S)).

== Subsequent developments ==
The whole act was repealed by section 1 of, and the schedule to, the Statute Law Revision Act 1867 (30 & 31 Vict. c. 59), which came into force on 15 July 1867.
