= Peace and War Act 1703 =

Act of the pre-Union Parliament of Scotland

- Act of Parliament
- Parliament of Scotland
- Long title: Act anent Peace and War.
- Citation: 1703 c. 6 [12mo ed: c. 5]

Dates
- Royal assent: 16 September 1703

Other legislation
- Repealed by: Repeal of Certain Scotch Acts 1707

Status: Repealed

The Act anent (Note: Scots anent means about or concerning.) Peace and War (c. 6) was an act of the Parliament of Scotland passed in 1703.

The act concerned foreign policy and the royal prerogative: it provided that following the death of Queen Anne without direct heirs, no future monarch of Scotland and England could take Scotland to war without the explicit consent of the parliament.

It was a response to the English Act of Settlement 1701 which had made members of the House of Hanover heirs to the throne of England. The Scots, already unhappy with the War of the Spanish Succession, were concerned that rule by Hanoverians would lead to unwelcome Scottish involvement in German and continental wars. Later the same parliament forced royal assent to the Act of Security 1704. The English parliament retaliated with the Alien Act 1705, removing Scottish trading privileges in England.

The conflict between the two parliaments was finally resolved by their merger under the terms of the Acts of Union 1707. The union made the Act anent Peace and War and the Act of Security void, and they were formally repealed in December 1707 by the Repeal of Certain Scotch Acts 1707 (6 Ann. c. 32).
